= Boeing AH-64 Apache =

U.S. attack helicopter

AH-64 Apache
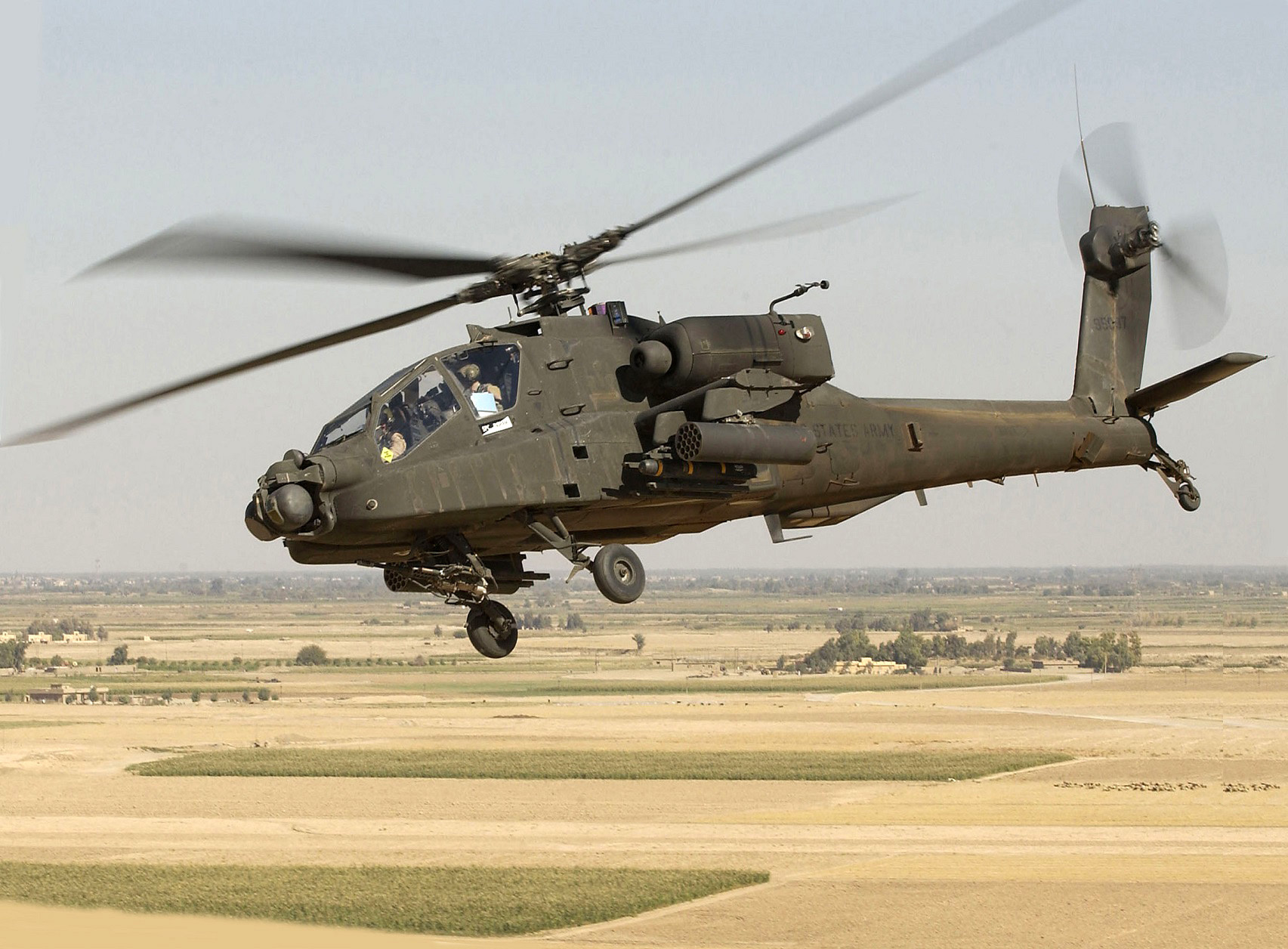
- An AH-64 Apache from the U.S. Army's 101st Aviation Regiment in Iraq

General information
- Type: Attack helicopter
- National origin: United States
- Manufacturer: Hughes Helicopters (1975–1984); McDonnell Douglas (1984–1997); Boeing Defense, Space & Security (1997–present)
- Status: In service
- Primary users: United States Army: British Army Air Corps; Israeli Air Force; Royal Saudi Land Forces
- Number built: 2,700+

History
- Manufactured: 1975–present
- Introduction date: April 1986
- First flight: 30 September 1975
- Variant: AgustaWestland Apache

The Hughes/McDonnell Douglas/Boeing AH-64 Apache (/əˈpætʃi/ ə-PATCH-ee) is an American twin-turboshaft attack helicopter with a tailwheel-type landing gear and a tandem cockpit for a crew of two. Nose-mounted sensors help acquire targets and provide night vision. It carries a 30 mm (1.18 in) M230 chain gun under its forward fuselage and four hardpoints on stub-wing pylons for armament and stores, typically AGM-114 Hellfire missiles and Hydra 70 rocket pods. Redundant systems help it survive combat damage.

The Apache began as the Model 77 developed by Hughes Helicopters for the United States Army's Advanced Attack Helicopter program to replace the AH-1 Cobra. The prototype YAH-64 first flew on 30 September 1975. The U.S. Army selected the YAH-64 over the Bell YAH-63 in 1976, and later approved full production in 1982. After acquiring Hughes Helicopters in 1984, McDonnell Douglas continued AH-64 production and development. The helicopter was introduced to U.S. Army service in April 1986. The advanced AH-64D Apache Longbow was delivered to the Army in March 1997. Production has been continued by Boeing Defense, Space & Security. As of March 2024, over 2,700 Apaches have been delivered to the U.S. Army and 18 international partners and allies.

Primarily operated by the U.S. Army, the AH-64 has also become the primary attack helicopter of multiple nations, including Greece, Japan, Israel, the Netherlands, Singapore, and the United Arab Emirates. It has been built under license in the United Kingdom as the AgustaWestland Apache. American AH-64s have served in conflicts in Panama, the Persian Gulf, Kosovo, Afghanistan, Iraq, and Iran. Israel has used the Apache to fight in Lebanon and the Gaza Strip. British and Dutch Apaches were deployed to wars in Afghanistan and Iraq beginning in 2001 and 2003.

== Development ==
=== Advanced Attack Helicopter ===
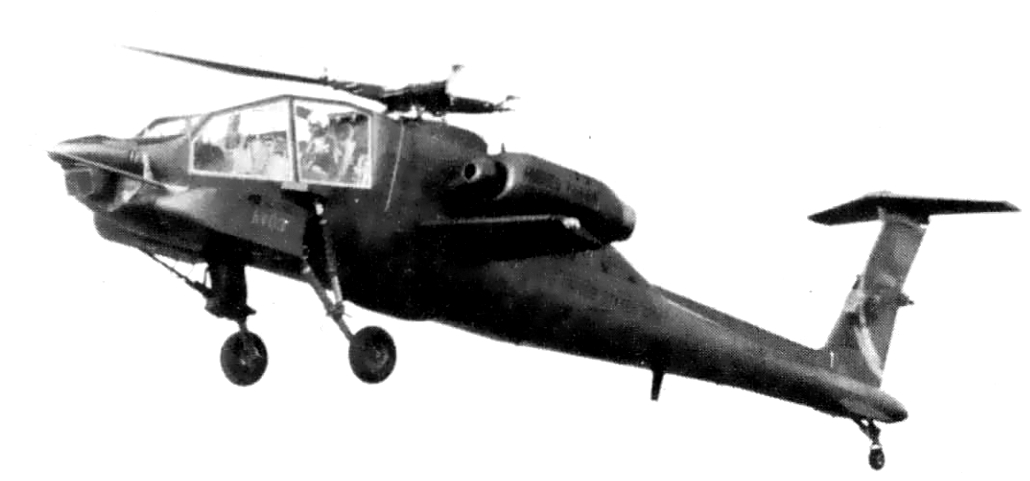
An early Hughes YAH-64 prototype with T-tail

After the AH-56 Cheyenne was cancelled in 1972 in favor of projects like the U.S. Air Force A-10 Thunderbolt II and the Marine Corps AV-8A Harrier, the United States Army sought an aircraft to fill an anti-armor attack role that would still be under Army command. The 1948 Key West Agreement forbade the Army from owning combat fixed-wing aircraft. The Army wanted an aircraft better than the AH-1 Cobra in firepower, performance, and range. It would have the maneuverability for terrain following nap-of-the-earth (NoE) flying. To this end, the U.S. Army issued a Request For Proposals (RFP) for the Advanced Attack Helicopter (AAH) program on 15 November 1972. As a sign of the importance of this project, in September 1973 the Army designated its five most important projects as the "Big Five", with the AAH included.

Proposals were submitted by Bell, Boeing Vertol/Grumman team, Hughes, Lockheed, and Sikorsky. In July 1973, the U.S. Department of Defense selected finalists Bell and Hughes Aircraft's Toolco Aircraft Division (later Hughes Helicopters). This began the phase 1 of the competition. Each company built prototype helicopters and went through a flight test program. Hughes' Model 77/YAH-64A prototype first flew on 30 September 1975, while Bell's Model 409/YAH-63A prototype first flew on 1 October 1975. After evaluating the test results, the Army selected Hughes' YAH-64A over Bell's YAH-63A in 1976. Reasons for selecting the YAH-64A included its more damage tolerant four-blade main rotor and the instability of the YAH-63's tricycle landing gear arrangement.

The AH-64A then entered phase 2 of the AAH program under which three pre-production AH-64s would be built, additionally, the two YAH-64A flight prototypes and the ground test unit were upgraded to the same standard. Weapons and sensor systems were integrated and tested during this time, including the laser-guided AGM-114 Hellfire missile. Development of the Hellfire missile had begun in 1974, originally known by the name of Helicopter Launched, Fire and Forget Missile ('Hellfire' being a shortened acronym), for the purpose of arming helicopter platforms with an effective anti-tank missile.

=== Into production ===
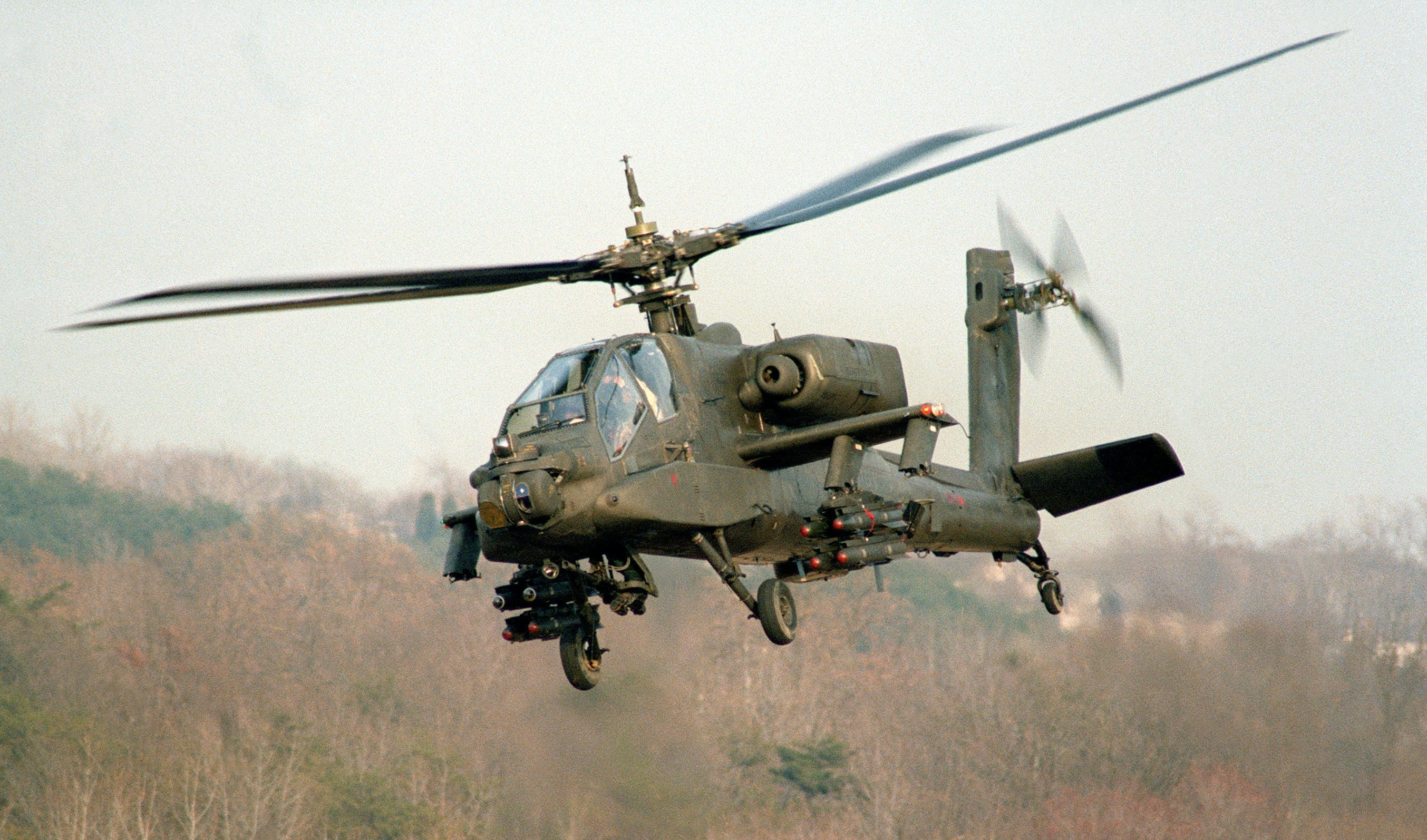
A YAH-64A prototype, 1982

In 1981, three pre-production AH-64As were handed over to the U.S. Army for Operational Test II. The Army testing was successful, but afterward it was decided to upgrade to the more powerful T700-GE-701 variant of engine, rated at 1,690 shp (1,260 kW). The AH-64 was named the Apache in late 1981, after the Apache tribe, following the tradition of naming Army helicopters after Native American tribes. It was approved for full-scale production in 1982. In 1983, the first production helicopter was rolled out at Hughes Helicopter's facility at Mesa, Arizona. Hughes Helicopters was purchased by McDonnell Douglas for $470 million in 1984 (equivalent to $1.457×10^{9} in 2025). The helicopter unit later became part of The Boeing Company with the merger of Boeing and McDonnell Douglas in August 1997. In 1986, the incremental or flyaway cost for the AH-64A was $7M and the average unit cost was approximately $13.9M based on total costs.

A 1985 Department of Defense engineering analysis by the inspector general's office reported that significant design deficiencies still needed to be addressed by the contractor. The Army project manager Col. William H. Forster published a list of 101 action items. In 1986, the four 22-foot-long main rotor blades, each made from steel and composite material glued together to maximize strength and minimize weight by the Composite Structures Division of Alcoa Composites, were added to the list. The steel-composite rotors could not meet the Army specification for a life of 1500 flight hours, and needed replacement after just 146 hours. After six changes to the design, the rotor blade life was extended to 1400 hours by early 1991.

As of 2024, the AH-64E is being produced at an economical rate of 82 aircraft a year. Boeing states that the minimum sustainment rate for the aircraft is 48 per year while current tooling and space allows for up to 98 aircraft to be manufactured per year. The U.S. Army states that with additional investment and labor, production could be raised to 144 aircraft per year.

=== Further development ===
During the 1980s, McDonnell Douglas studied an AH-64B, featuring an updated cockpit, new fire control system and other upgrades. In 1988, funding was approved for a multi-stage upgrade program to improve sensor and weapon systems. Technological advance led to the program's cancellation in favor of more ambitious changes. In August 1990, development of the AH-64D Apache Longbow was approved by the Defense Acquisition Board. The first AH-64D prototype flew on 15 April 1992. Prototype testing ended in April 1995. During testing, six AH-64D helicopters were pitted against a bigger group of AH-64As. The results demonstrated the AH-64D to have a sevenfold increase in survivability and fourfold increase in lethality compared to the AH-64A. On 13 October 1995, full-scale production was approved; a $1.9-billion five-year contract was signed in August 1996 to upgrade 232 AH-64As into AH-64Ds. On 17 March 1997, the first production AH-64D flew. It was delivered on 31 March.

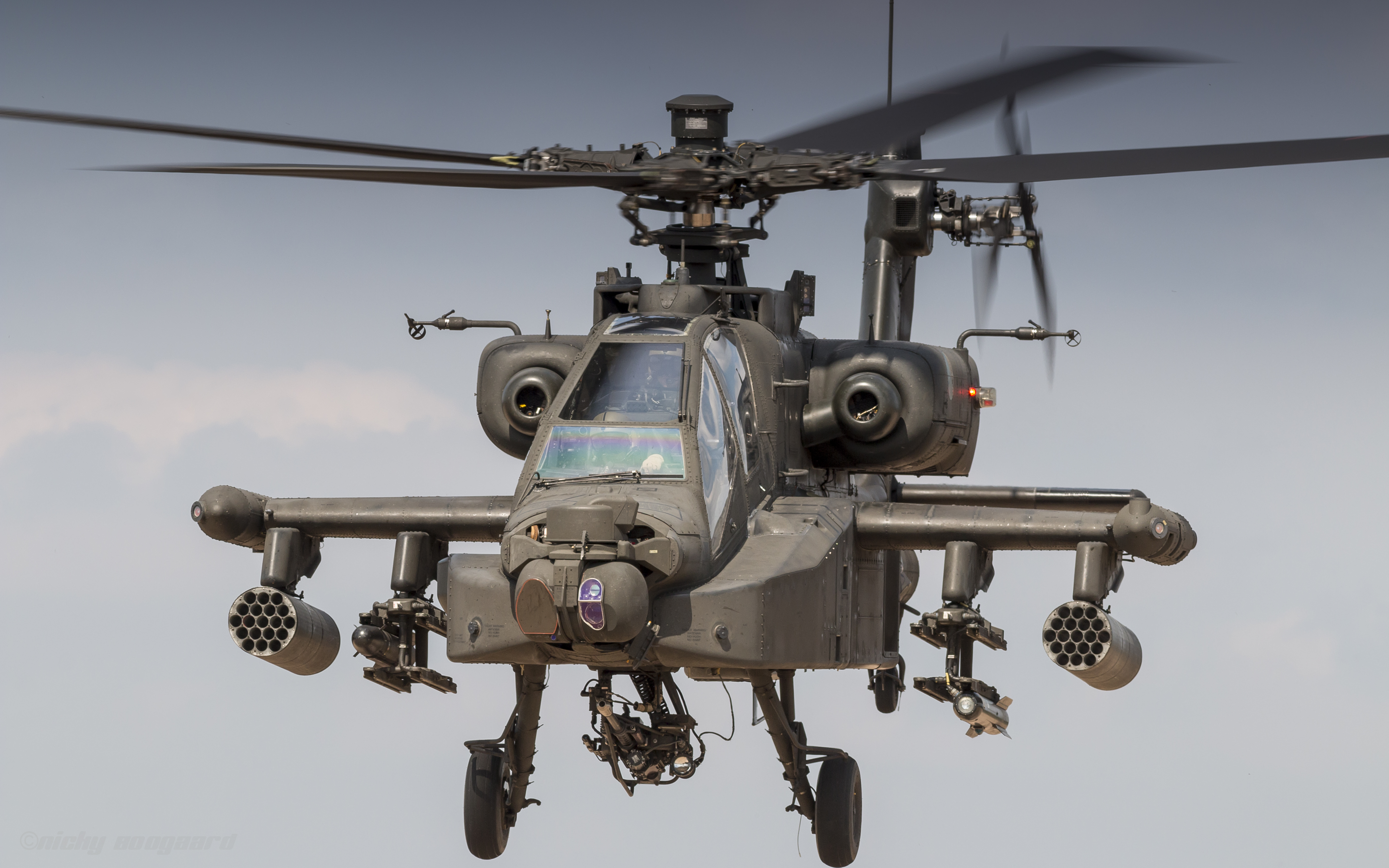
RNLAF AH-64 Apache in flight

The AH-64D program cost a total of $11 billion (~$16.4 billion in 2025) through 2007. In April 2006, Boeing was awarded a $67.6 million (~$104 million in 2025) fixed-price contract for the remanufacture of several existing U.S. AH-64As to the AH-64D configuration. Between May 2009 and July 2011, a further five contracts were issued to remanufacture batches of AH-64As into AH-64Ds. Since 2008, nations operating the older Apaches have been urged to undertake modernization programs as support for the AH-64A is withdrawn.

By May 2019, Boeing tested in a wind tunnel a compound Apache scale model with a pusher propeller, a small wing to increase range and speed, and a counter-torque tail rotor like the cancelled Lockheed AH-56 Cheyenne of the 1960s. It competed for the U.S. Army's Future Long Range Assault Aircraft (FLRAA) unveiled in April, developed from the Future Vertical Lift Capability Set 3 (medium rotorcraft) without the attack requirement, while the U.S. Army's FARA should replace the retired Bell OH-58 Kiowa scout and up to half of the AH-64 fleet.

=== Outsourced manufacturing arrangements ===
Portions of the Apache are produced by various aerospace firms. The European-based company AgustaWestland has produced a number of components for the Apache both for the international market and for the British Army's AgustaWestland Apache.

Originally, AH-64 fuselages were produced by the US firm Teledyne Ryan Aeronautical. In 1998, the planned transfer of fuselage production led to a prolonged legal dispute between Teledyne Ryan and Boeing. In 2004, Korea Aerospace Industries became the then-sole manufacturer of the fuselage; it delivered its 100th fuselage in 2009.

On 9 November 2015, Boeing and Tata Advanced Systems (TASL) announced a joint venture, named Tata–Boeing Aerospace (TBAL), to co-produce the AH-64's fuselage in India for the global market. On 18 June 2016, TBAL laid the foundation of the facility outside Hyderabad. In March 2018, it was inaugurated by Nirmala Sitharaman, the then Indian Defence Minister. On 1 June 2018, TBAL delivered the first Made-in-India fuselage ahead of schedule to Boeing's facility in Mesa, Arizona for final assembly. On 23 July 2021, TBAL delivered the 100th Indian-made fuselage. By then, the facility also started delivering secondary structure and vertical spar boxes for the AH-64. On 19 January 2023, TBAL delivered the first fuselage for the Indian Army's order.

By 2018, this facility covered an area of 14,000 m^{2} (3.5 acres) and was staffed by 350 workers at full production. The workforce grew to 900 by 2023. Of the fuselages delivered, 90% of the components were manufactured in India through more than 100 MSME suppliers by 2025. The 300th Apache fuselage was rolled out from the facility on 10 February 2025, while the 400th was rolled out on 7 September 2026.

== Design ==
=== Overview ===
Apache variant	Engine variant	Engine power
AH-64A+/D	General Electric T700-701	1,696 shp (1,265 kW)
AH-64A+/D	General Electric T700-701C	1,890 shp (1,410 kW)
AH-64E	General Electric T700-701D	1,994 shp (1,487 kW)
WAH-64D	Rolls-Royce Turbomeca RTM322	2,100 shp (1,600 kW)

The AH-64 Apache has a four-blade main rotor and a four-blade tail rotor. The crew sits in tandem, with the pilot sitting behind and above the co-pilot/gunner. Both crew members are capable of flying the aircraft and performing methods of weapon engagements independently. The AH-64 is powered by two General Electric T700 turboshaft engines with high-mounted exhausts on either side of the fuselage. Various models of engines have been used on the Apache; those in British service originally used engines from Rolls-Royce. In 2004, General Electric Aviation began producing more powerful T700-GE-701D engines, rated at 2,000 shp (1,500 kW) for AH-64Ds.

The crew compartment and rotor blades are designed to sustain a hit from 23 mm (0.91 in) rounds. The airframe includes some 2,500 lb (1,100 kg) of protection and has a self-sealing fuel system to protect against ballistic projectiles. The crew compartment also incorporates a transparent blast shield between the pilot and gunner seats so that at least one crew member can survive in the event of a direct hit, but the canopy and windows are otherwise unrated against ballistic threats.

The aircraft was designed to meet the crashworthiness requirements of MIL-STD-1290, which specifies minimum requirement for crash impact energy attenuation to minimize crew injuries and fatalities. This was achieved through incorporation of increased structural strength, crashworthy landing gear, seats and fuel system.

On a standard day, when temperatures are 59 °F (15 °C), the AH-64 has a vertical rate of climb of 1,775 feet per minute (541 m/min), and a service ceiling of 21,000 feet (6,400 m).

AH-64 Apache in Afghanistan

=== Avionics and targeting ===
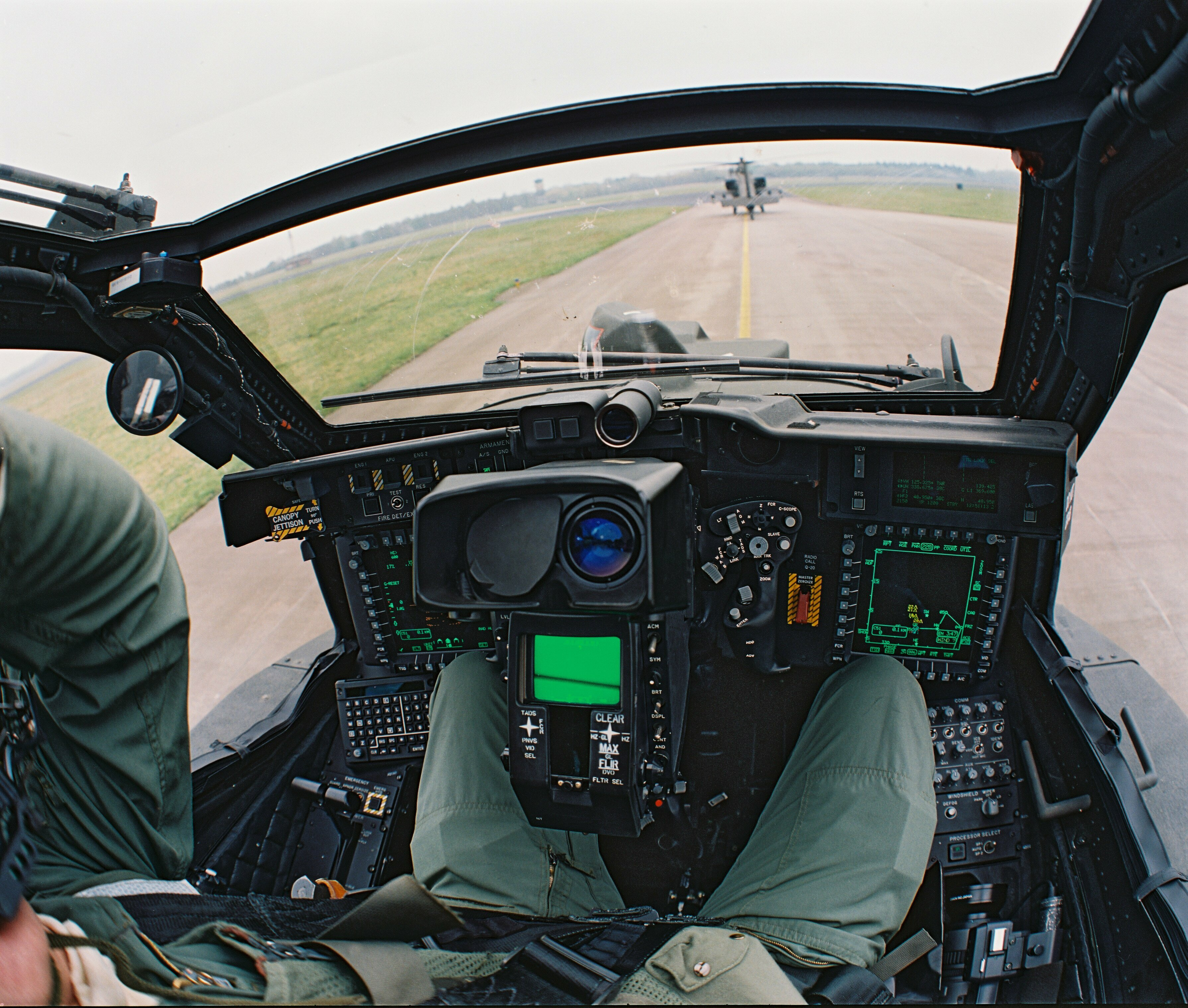
The gunner's position in the AH-64D Longbow Apache

The gunner's helmet mounted sight (IHADSS) works with the gun

One of the revolutionary features of the Apache was its helmet mounted display, the Integrated Helmet and Display Sighting System (IHADSS); among its capabilities, either the pilot or gunner can slave the helicopter's 30 mm automatic M230 Chain Gun to their helmet, making the gun track head movements to point where they look. The M230E1 can be alternatively fixed to a locked forward firing position, or controlled via the Target Acquisition and Designation System (TADS). On more modern AH-64s, the TADS/PNVS has been replaced by Lockheed Martin's Arrowhead (MTADS) targeting system.

U.S. Army engagement training is performed under the Aerial Weapons Scoring System Integration with Longbow Apache Tactical Engagement Simulation System (AWSS-LBA TESS), using live 30 mm and rocket ammunition as well as simulated Hellfire missiles. The Smart Onboard Data Interface Module (SMODIM) transmits Apache data to an AWSS ground station for gunnery evaluation. The AH-64's standard of performance for aerial gunnery is to achieve at least 1 hit for every 30 shots fired at a wheeled vehicle at a range of 800–1,200 m (870–1,310 yd).

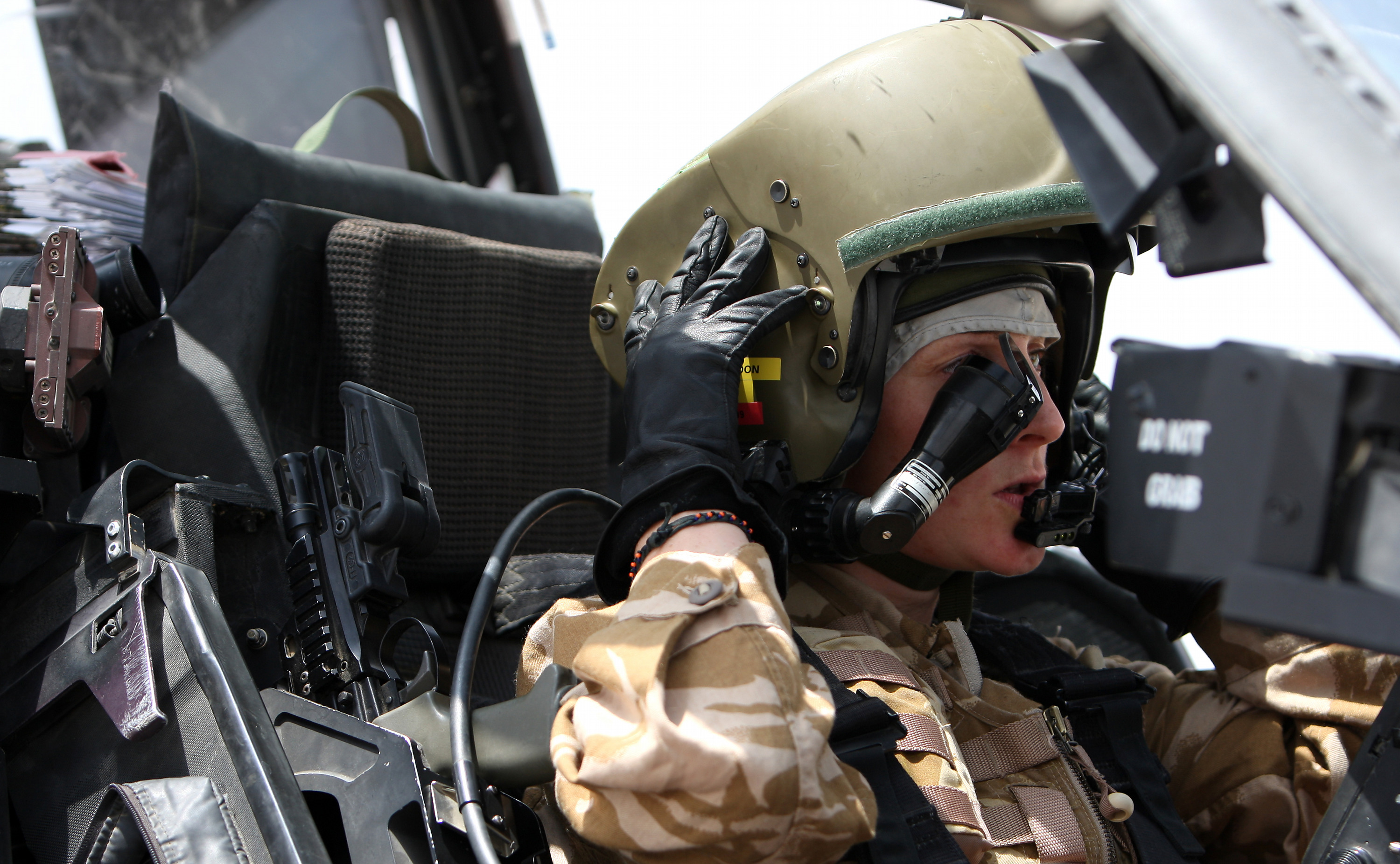
British Apache pilot with IHADSS

The AH-64 was designed to perform in front-line environments, and to operate at night or day and during adverse weather conditions, thanks to systems including the Target Acquisition and Designation System, Pilot Night Vision System (TADS/PNVS), passive infrared countermeasures, GPS, and the IHADSS. Longbow-equipped Apaches can locate up to 256 targets simultaneously within 50 km (31 mi). In August 2012, 24 U.S. Army AH-64Ds were equipped with the Ground Fire Acquisition System (GFAS), which detects and targets ground-based weapons fire sources in all-light conditions and with a 120° visual field. The GFAS consists of two sensor pods working with the AH-64's other sensors, and a thermographic camera that precisely locates muzzle flashes.

In 2014, it was announced that new targeting and surveillance sensors were under development to provide high-resolution color imagery to crews, replacing older low definition black-and-white imaging systems. Lockheed received the first contract in January 2016, upgrading the Arrowhead turret to provide higher-resolution color imaging with longer ranges and a wider field of view. In 2014, the U.S. Army was adapting its Apaches for increased maritime performance as part of the Pentagon's rebalance to the Pacific. Additional avionics and sensor improvements includes an extended-range radar capable of detecting small ships in littoral environments, software adaptions to handle maritime targets, and adding Link 16 data-links for better communications with friendly assets.

=== Armament and configurations ===
Mission	Hellfire	30 mm rounds	Hydra 70	Maximum speed (knots)	Rate of climb (ft/min)	Endurance (hours)
Anti-armor	16	1,200	0	148	990	2.5
Covering Force	8	1,200	38	150	860	2.5
Escort	0	1,200	76	153	800	2.5

The AH-64 is adaptable to numerous different roles within its context as Close Combat Attack (CCA). In addition to the 30 mm M230E1 Chain Gun, the Apache carries a range of external stores and weapons on its stub-wing pylons, typically a mixture of AGM-114 Hellfire anti-tank missiles, and Hydra 70 general-purpose unguided 70 mm (2.756 in) rockets. The Hellfire is designed to defeat stationary or moving tanks as far away as 6,500 meters.

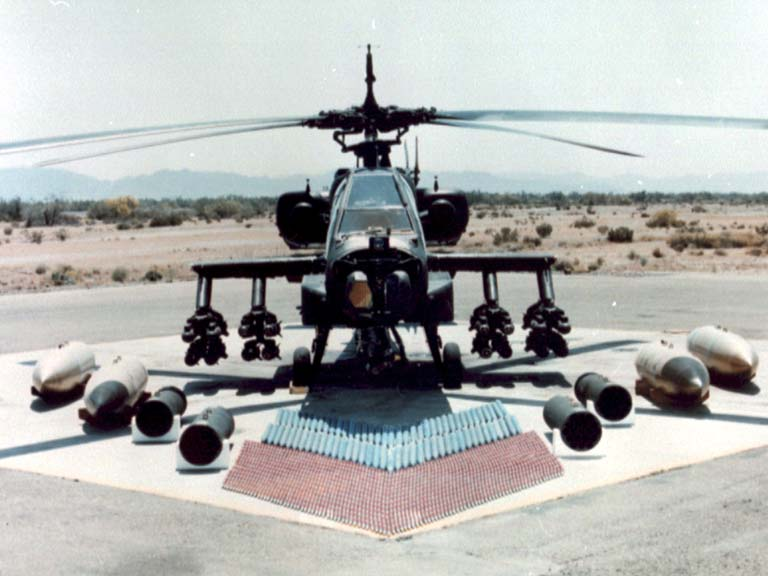
AH-64 Apache weapon loadout

Since 2005, the Hellfire missile outfitted with a thermobaric warhead is designated AGM-114N; this missile variant is intended for use against ground forces and urban warfare operations. In October 2015, the U.S. Army ordered its first batch of Advanced Precision Kill Weapon System (APKWS) guided 70 mm rockets for the Apache.

Starting in the 1980s, the Stinger and AIM-9 Sidewinder air-to-air missiles and the AGM-122 Sidearm anti-radiation missile were evaluated for use upon the AH-64. The Stinger was initially selected; the U.S. Army was also considering the Starstreak air-to-air missile. External fuel tanks can also be carried on the stub wings to increase range and mission time. The stub-wing pylons have mounting points for maintenance access; these mountings can also be used to secure personnel externally for emergency transport. Stinger missiles are often used on non-U.S. Apaches, as foreign forces do not have as many air superiority aircraft to control the skies. The AH-64E initially lacked the ability to use the Stinger to make room for self-defense equipment, but the capability was added back following a South Korean demand.

AH-64 Apache cockpit and cannon

The AH-64E is able to control unmanned aerial vehicles (UAVs), used by the U.S. Army to perform aerial scouting missions previously performed by the OH-58 Kiowa. Apaches can request to take control of an RQ-7 Shadow or MQ-1C Grey Eagle from ground control stations to safely scout via datalink communications. There are four levels of UAV interoperability (LOI): LOI 1 indirectly receives payload data; LOI 2 receives payload data through direct communication; LOI 3 deploys the UAV's armaments; and LOI 4 takes over flight control. UAVs can search for enemies and, if equipped with a laser designator, target them for the Apache or other friendly aircraft.

AH-64E launching a Spike NLOS missile

Boeing has suggested that the AH-64 could be fitted with a directed energy weapon. The company has developed a small laser weapon, initially designed to engage small UAVs, that uses a high-resolution telescope to direct a 2–10 kW beam with the diameter of a penny out to a range of 5.4 nmi (10.0 km; 6.2 mi). On the Apache, the laser could be used to destroy enemy communications or radio equipment.

On 14 July 2016, it was reported that the AH-64 had successfully completed testing of the MBDA Brimstone anti-armor missile. In January 2020, the U.S. Army announced it was fielding the Spike NLOS missile on AH-64E Apaches as an interim solution to acquire new munitions that provide greater stand-off capabilities.

== Operational history ==
=== United States ===
==== Twentieth century ====
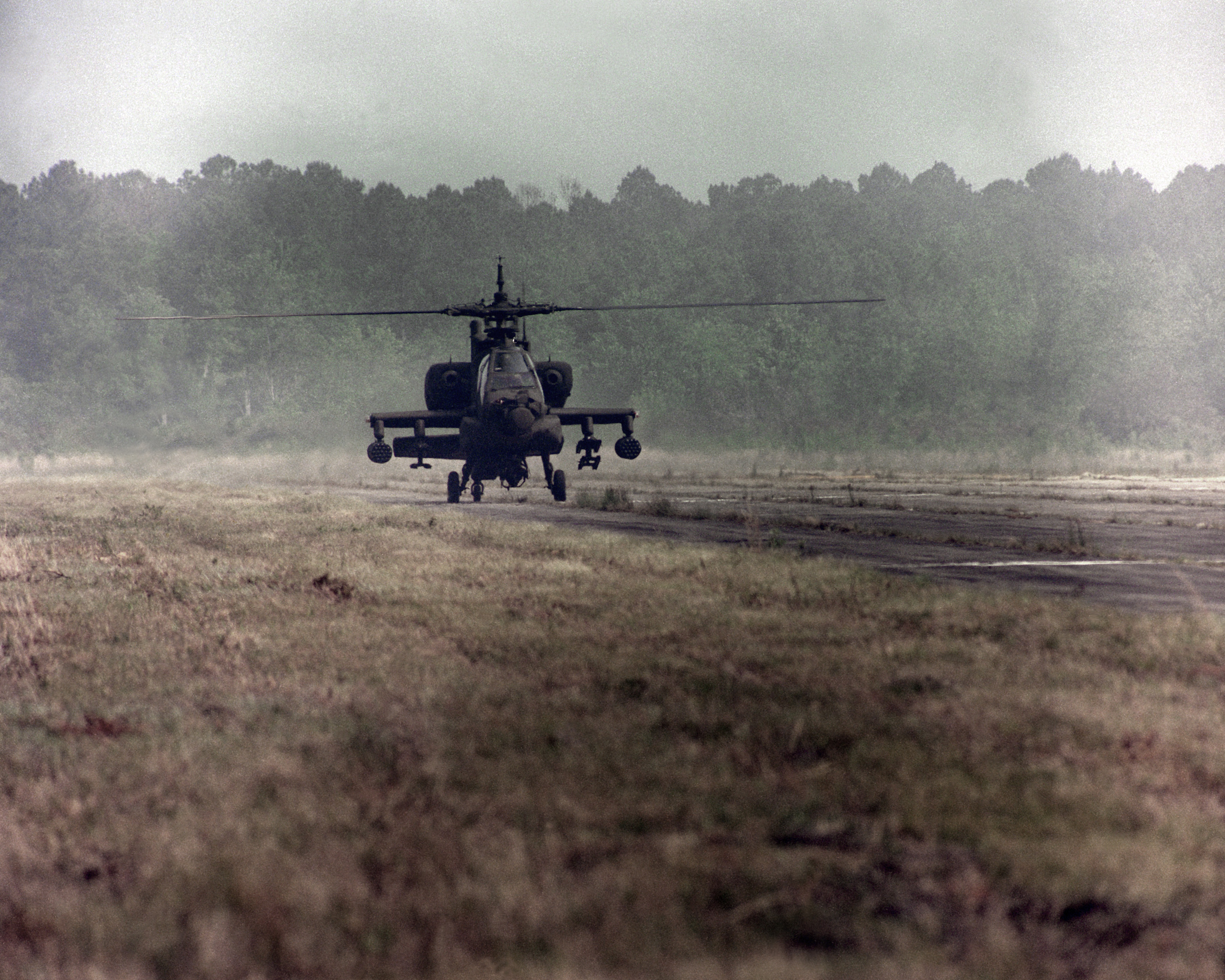
AH-64A Apache helicopter returns from SOLID SHIELD '89 exercise

In January 1984, the U.S. Army formally accepted its first production AH-64A and training of the first pilots began later that year. The first operational Apache unit, 7th Battalion, 17th Cavalry Brigade, began training on the AH-64A in April 1986 at Fort Hood, Texas. Two operational units with 68 AH-64s first deployed to Europe in September 1987 and took part in large military exercises there.

Upon fielding the Apache, capabilities such as the FLIR's use in extensive night operations made it clear that it was capable of operating beyond the forward line of own troops (FLOT) to which previous attack helicopters were normally restricted. It was discovered that the Apache was coincidentally fitted with the Have Quick UHF radio system used by the U.S. Air Force, allowing inter-service coordination and joint operations such as the joint air attack teams (JAAT). The Apache has operated extensively with close air support (CAS) aircraft, such as the USAF's Fairchild Republic A-10 Thunderbolt II and the USMC's McDonnell Douglas AV-8B Harrier II, often acting as a target designator to conserve the Apache's own munitions. The Apache was first used in combat in 1989, during Operation Just Cause, the invasion of Panama. It participated in over 240 combat hours, attacking various targets, mostly at night. General Carl Stiner, the commander of the operation, stated: "You could fire that Hellfire missile through a window from four miles away at night."

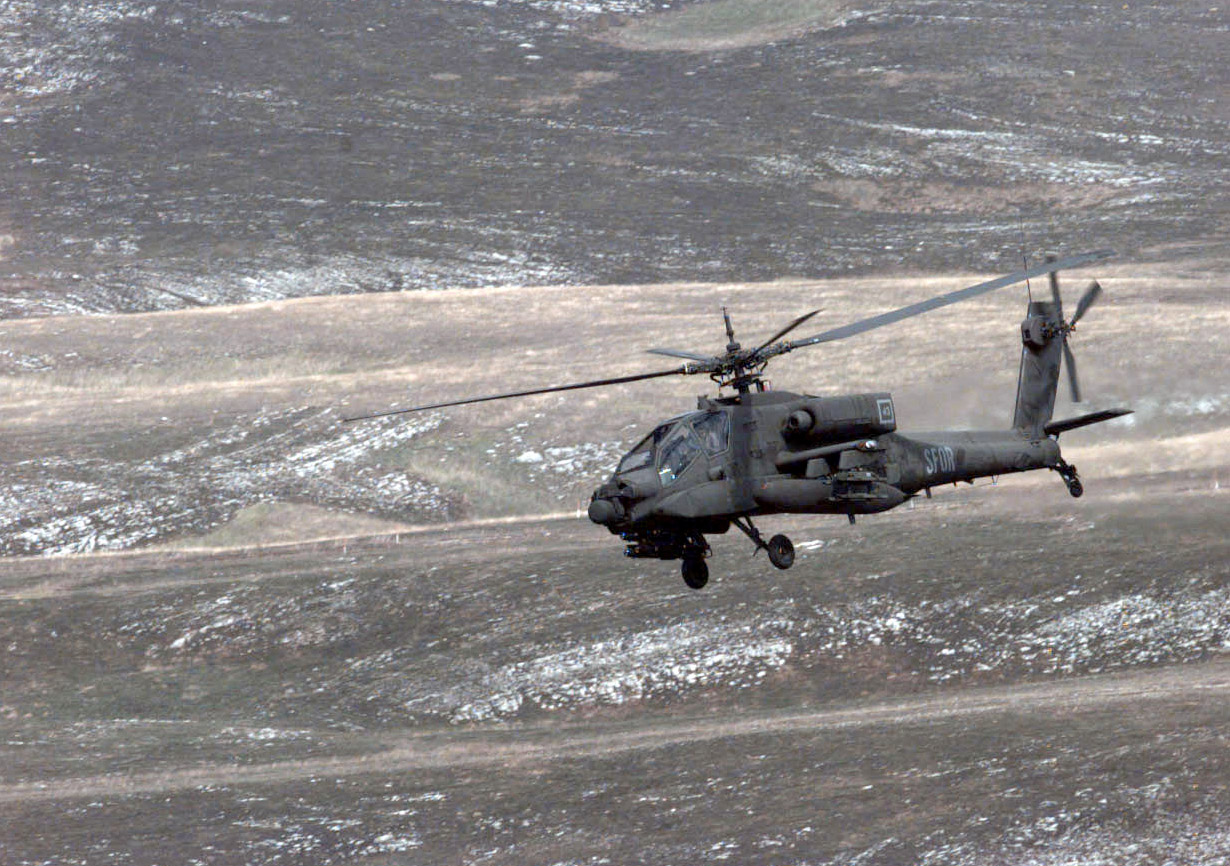
AH-64 at the Glamoc Firing Range in Bosnia and Herzegovina, 1998

Nearly half of all U.S. Apaches were deployed to Saudi Arabia following Iraq's invasion of Kuwait in 1990. During Operation Desert Storm on 17 January 1991, eight AH-64As guided by four MH-53 Pave Low IIIs destroyed part of Iraq's radar network in the operation's first attack, allowing the attack aircraft to evade detection. Each Apache carried an asymmetric load of Hydra 70 rockets, Hellfires, and one auxiliary fuel tank. During the 100-hour ground war, a total of 277 AH-64s took part, destroying 278 tanks, numerous armored personnel carriers and other Iraqi vehicles, for a total of over 500 kills. One AH-64 was lost in the war, crashing after a close range rocket-propelled grenade (RPG) hit; the crew survived. While effective in combat, the AH-64 presented serious logistical difficulties. Findings reported in 1990 stated "maintenance units could not keep up with the Apache's unexpectedly high work load..." To provide spare parts for combat operations, the U.S. Army unofficially grounded all other AH-64s worldwide; Apaches in the theater flew only one-fifth of planned flight-hours. Such problems were evident before the Gulf War.

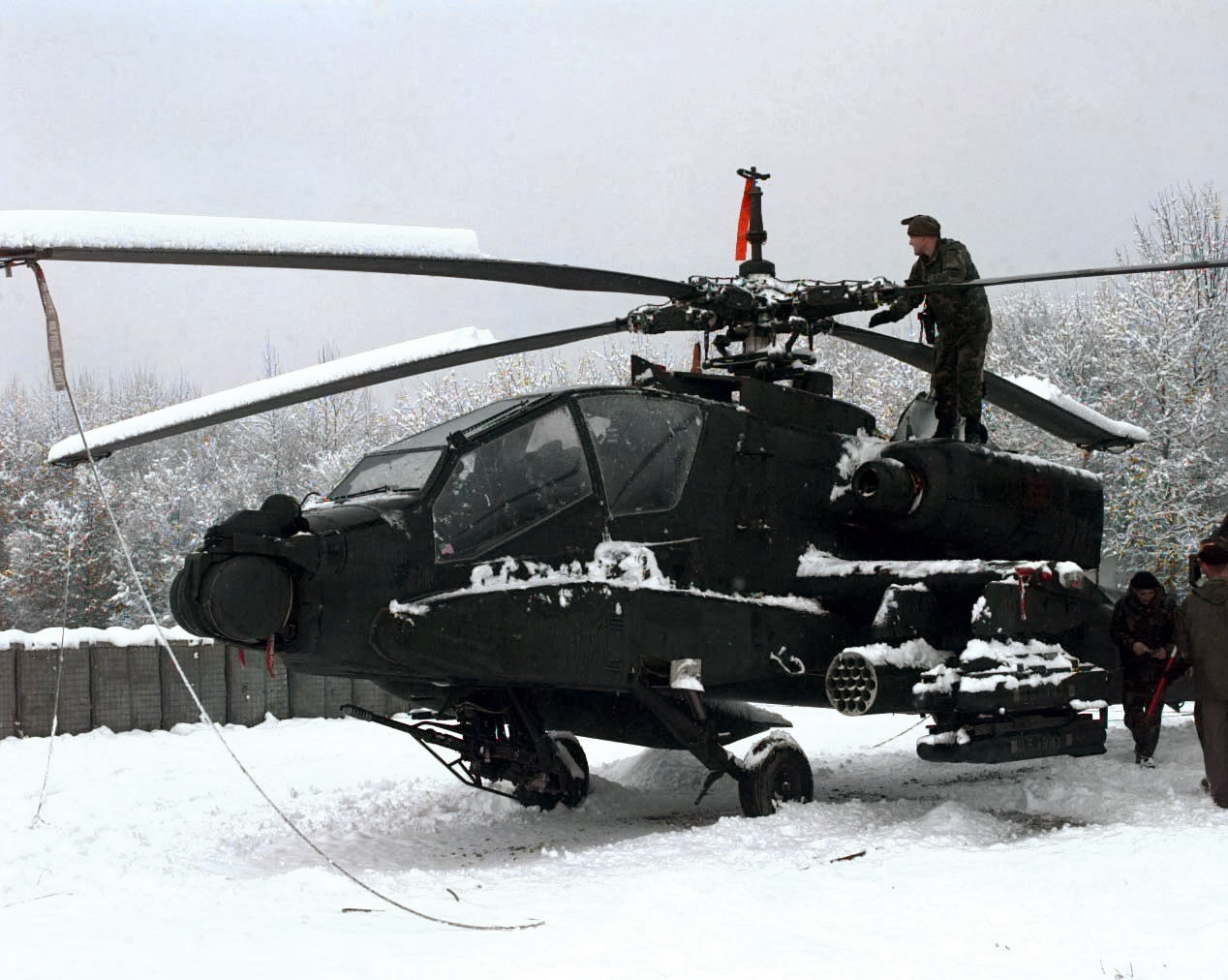
AH-64A on Operation Joint Guard in the Balkans, 1997

The AH-64 played roles in the Balkans during separate conflicts in Bosnia and Kosovo in the 1990s. During Task Force Hawk, 24 Apaches were deployed to a land base in Albania in 1999 for combat in Kosovo. These required 26,000 tons of equipment to be transported over 550 C-17 flights, at a cost of US$480 million. During these deployments, the AH-64 encountered problems, such as deficiencies in training, night vision equipment, fuel tanks, and survivability.

In 2000, Major General Dick Cody, 101st Airborne's commanding officer, wrote a strongly worded memo to the Chief of Staff about training and equipment failures. Almost no pilots were qualified to fly with night vision goggles, preventing nighttime operations. The Washington Post printed a front-page article on the failures, commenting: "The vaunted helicopters came to symbolize everything wrong with the Army as it enters the 21st century: Its inability to move quickly, its resistance to change, its obsession with casualties, its post-Cold War identity crisis". Although no Apache combat missions took place, two were lost in training exercises. An effective network of Yugoslav air defenses stopped Apaches from being deployed on combat missions in Kosovo.

==== 21st century ====
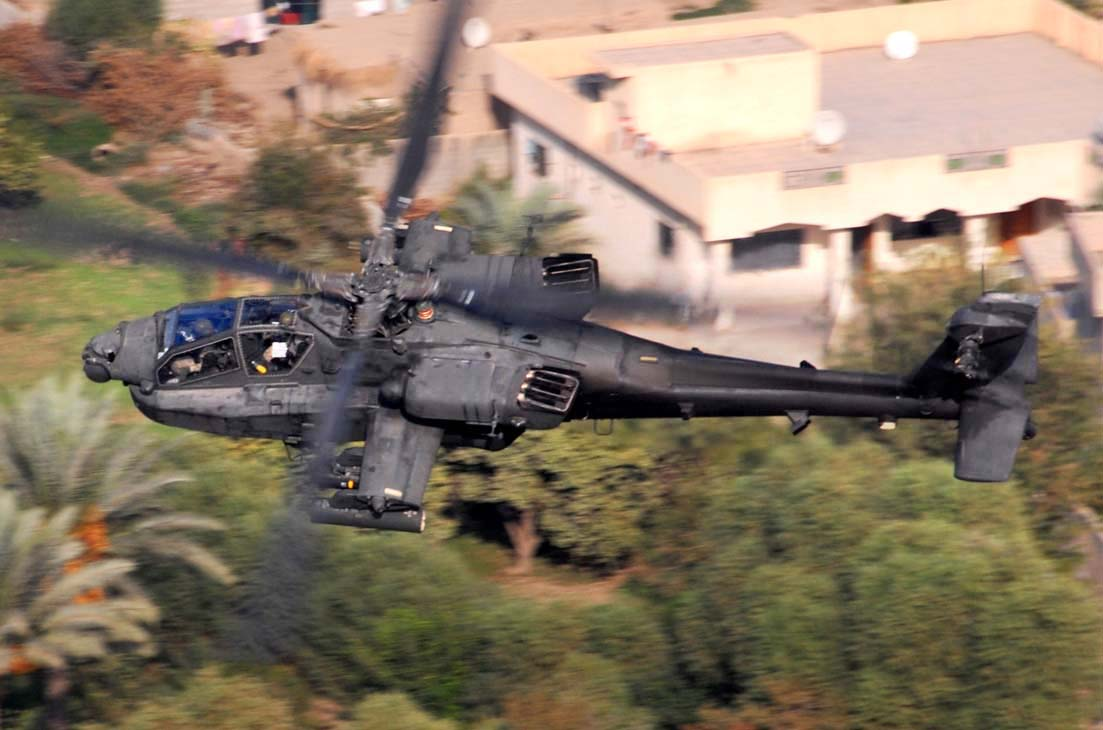
AH-64 over Baghdad, Iraq, on a reconnaissance mission, 2007

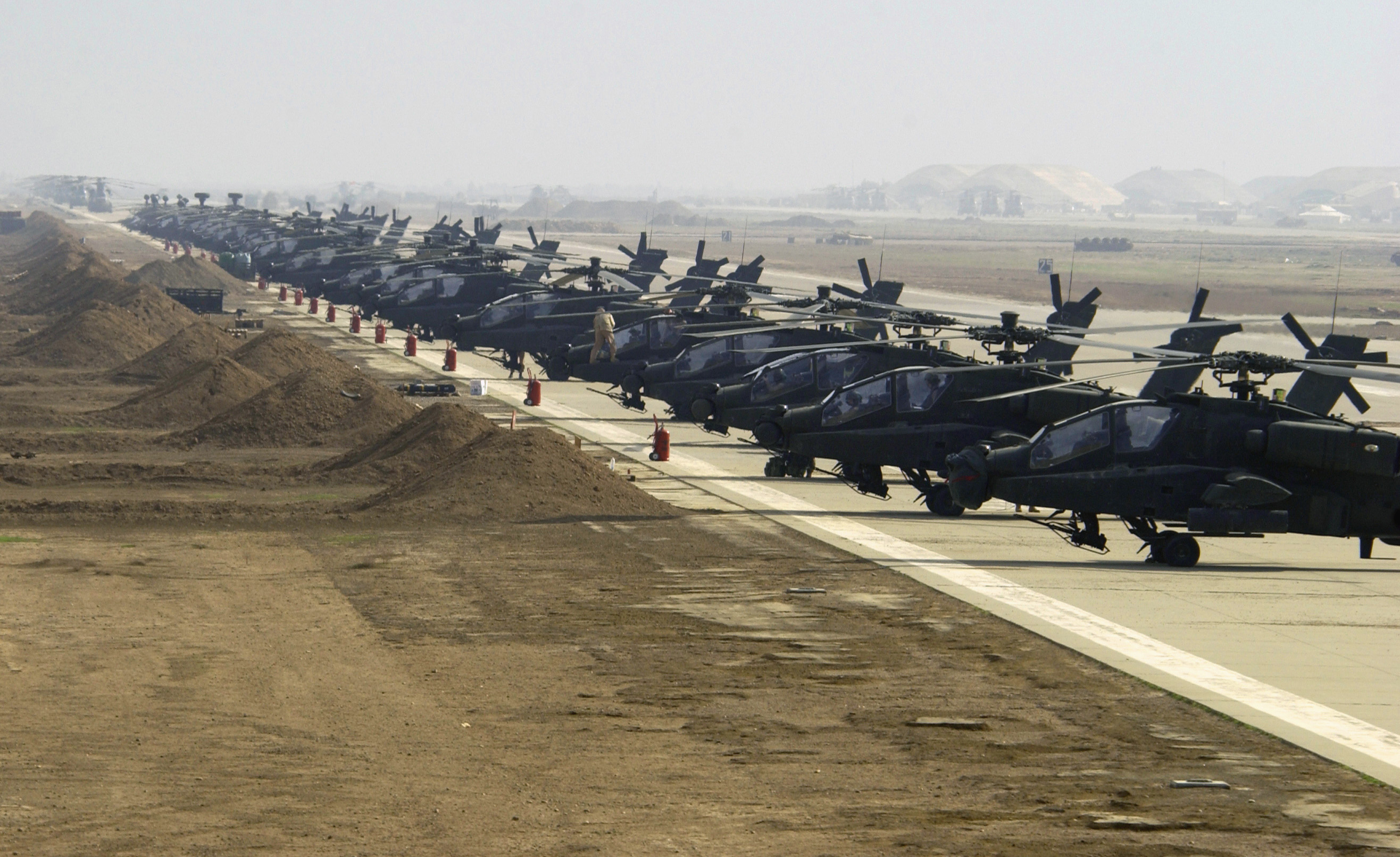
AH-64D helicopters gather for an operation

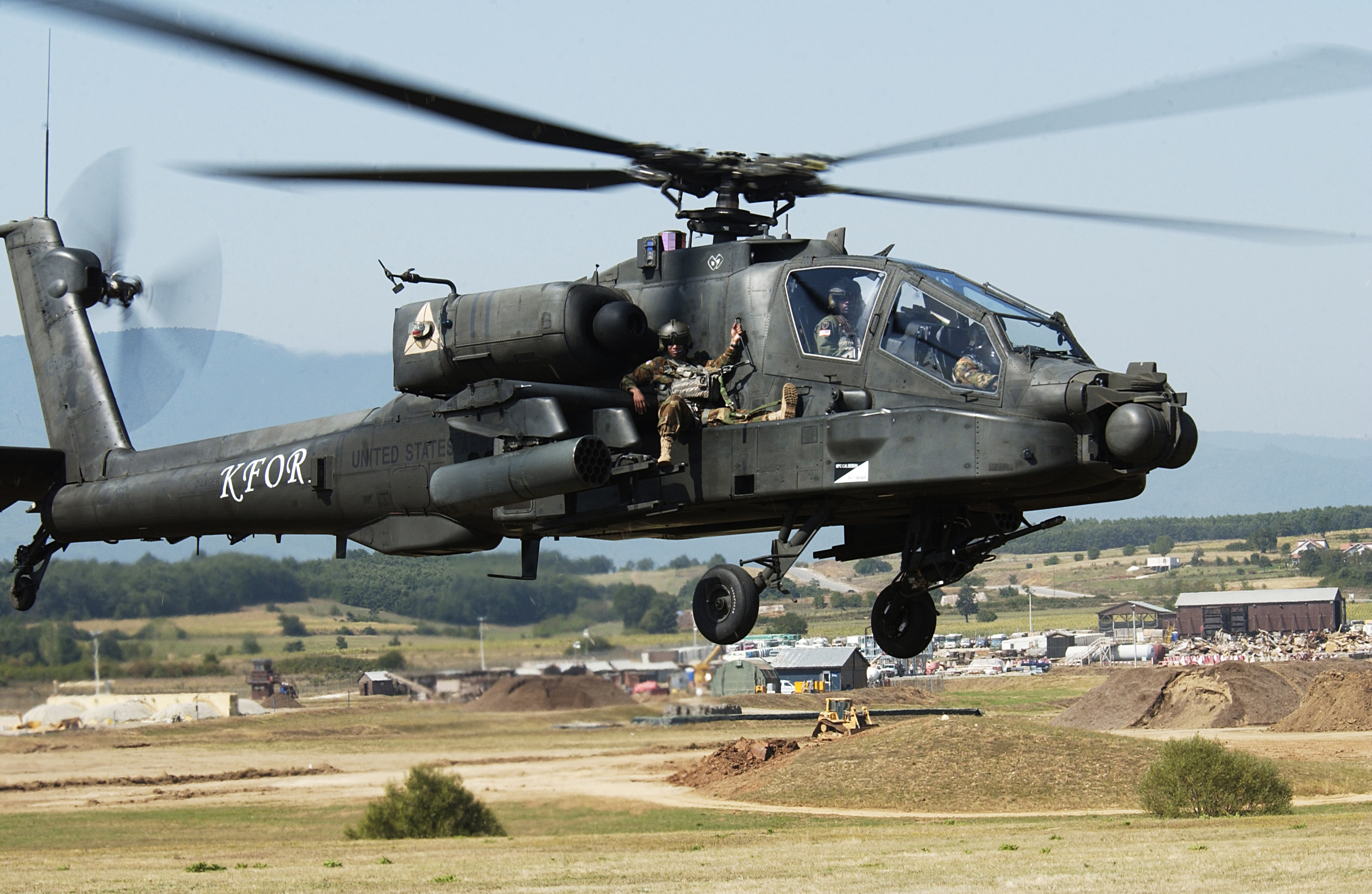
AH-64 during an extraction exercise at Camp Bondsteel, Kosovo, in 2007 with a soldier on the avionics bay.

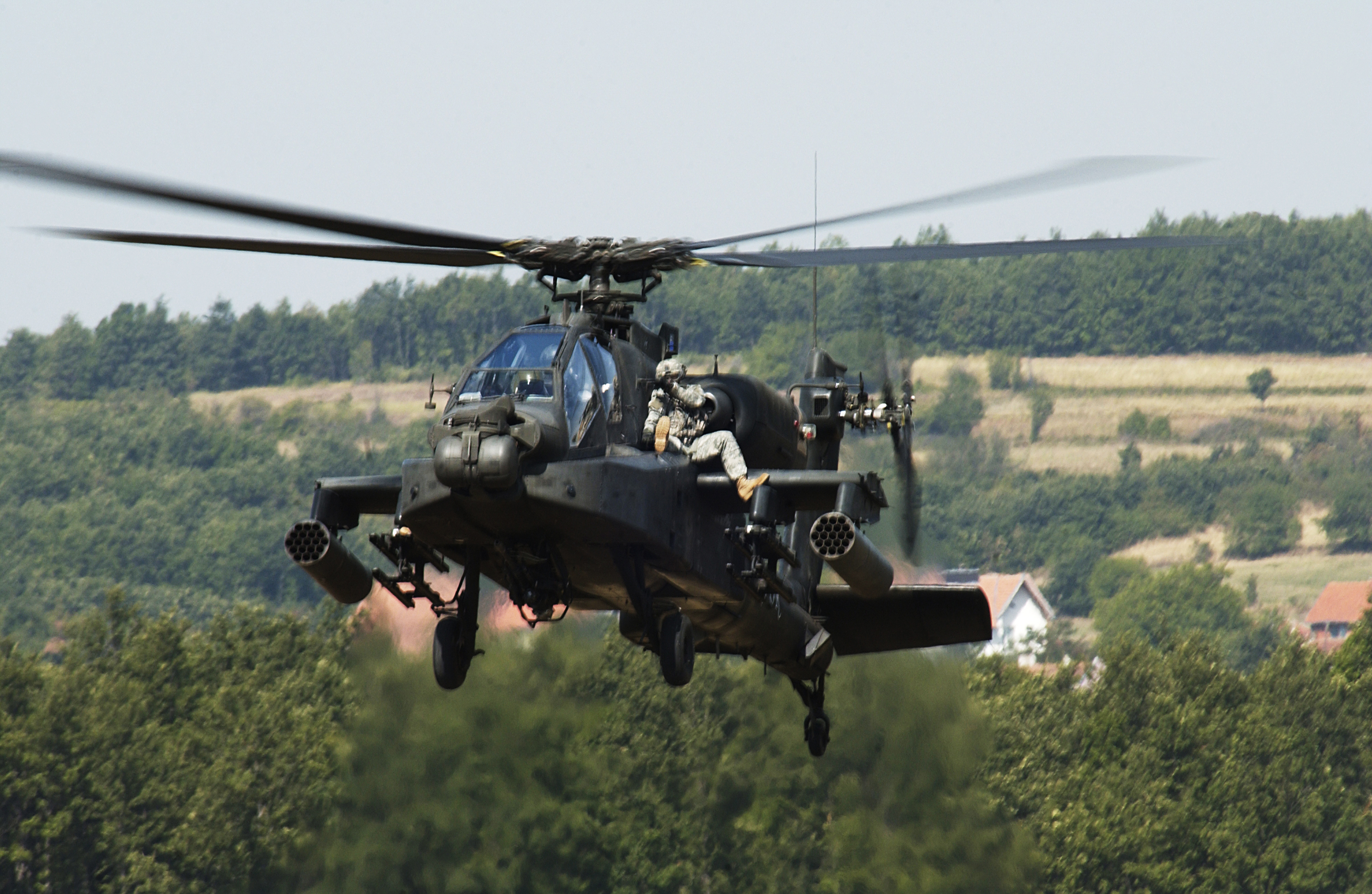
Extraction exercise with soldier "riding shotgun" on an Apache

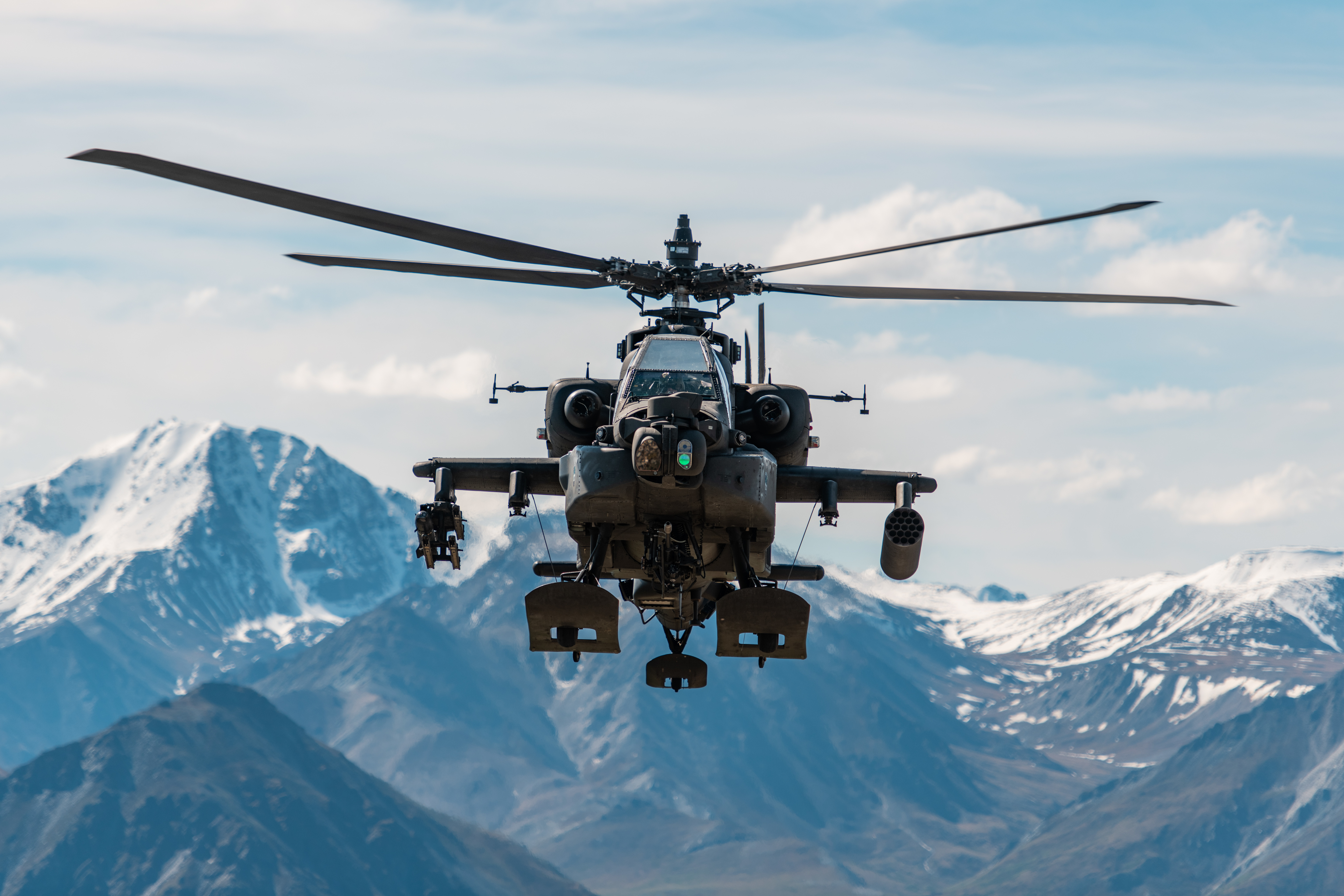
Ski-equipped AH-64D on exercises in Alaska

U.S. Apaches served in Operation Enduring Freedom in Afghanistan during the War in Afghanistan (2001–2021) from 2001. It was the only Army platform capable of providing accurate CAS duties for Operation Anaconda, often taking fire and quickly repaired during the intense early fighting. Apaches often flew in small teams with little autonomy to react to threats and opportunities, requiring lengthy dialogue with centrally micromanaged command structures. U.S. AH-64Ds typically flew in Afghanistan and Iraq without the Longbow Radar in the absence of armored threats. On 21 December 2009, a pair of U.S. Apaches attacked a British-held base in a friendly fire incident, killing one British soldier.

In 2003, the AH-64 participated in the invasion of Iraq during Operation Iraqi Freedom. On 24 March 2003, 31 Apaches were damaged; one was shot down in an unsuccessful attack on an Iraqi Republican Guard armored brigade near Karbala. Iraqi tank crews had set up a "flak trap" among terrain and effectively employed their guns. Iraqi officials claimed a farmer with a Brno rifle shot down the Apache, but the farmer denied involvement. The AH-64 came down intact and the crew were captured; it was destroyed via air strike the following day. This incident had significant consequences for the AH-64 helicopter because it revealed an important vulnerability. Despite being considered by army aviators as flying tanks at the time, it became clear that the AH-64 was actually highly susceptible to rifle fire. As a result, the army quietly disclosed in early 2006 that AH-64s would no longer have a major role in carrying out attacks deep inside enemy lines.

AH-64 engaging Taliban insurgents over Afghanistan

By the end of U.S. military operations in Iraq in December 2011, several Apaches had been shot down by enemy fire and lost in accidents. In 2006, an Apache was downed by a Soviet-made Strela 2 (SA-7) in Iraq, despite it being typically able to avoid such missiles. In 2007, four Apaches were destroyed on the ground by insurgent mortar fire using web-published geotagged photographs taken by soldiers. Several AH-64s were lost to accidents in Afghanistan. Most Apaches that took heavy damage were able to continue their missions and return safely. By 2011, the U.S. Army Apache fleet had accumulated more than 3 million flight hours since the first prototype flew in 1975. A DOD audit released in May 2011 found that Boeing had frequently overcharged the U.S. Army for routine spare parts in helicopters like the Apache, ranging from 33.3 percent to 177,475 percent.

On 21 February 2013, the 1st Battalion (Attack), 229th Aviation Regiment at Joint Base Lewis–McChord became the first U.S. Army unit to field the AH-64E Apache Guardian; a total of 24 AH-64E were received by mid-2013. On 27 November 2013, the AH-64E achieved initial operating capability (IOC). In March 2014, the 1st–229th Attack Reconnaissance Battalion deployed 24 AH-64Es to Afghanistan in the type's first combat deployment. From April through September 2014, AH-64Es in combat maintained an 88 percent readiness rate. The unit's deployment ended in November 2014, with the AH-64E accumulating 11,000 flight hours, each helicopter averaging 66 hours per month. The AH-64E flies 20 mph (32 km/h) faster than the AH-64D, cutting response time and has improved fuel efficiency, increasing time on station from 2.5–3 hours to 3–3.5 hours; Taliban forces were reportedly surprised by the AH-64E attacking sooner and for longer periods. AH-64Es also worked with medium and large UAVs to find targets and maintain positive ID, conducting 60 percent of the unit's direct-fire engagements in conjunction with UAVs; Guardian pilots often controlled UAVs and accessed their video feeds to use their greater altitudes and endurance to see the battlespace from standoff ranges.

In 2014, the Army began implementing a plan to move all Apaches from the Army Reserve and National Guard to the active Army to serve as scout helicopters to replace the OH-58 Kiowa. Using the AH-64 to scout would be less expensive than Kiowa upgrades or purchasing a new scout helicopter. AH-64Es can control UAVs like the MQ-1C Grey Eagle to perform aerial scouting missions; a 2010 study found the teaming of Apaches and UAVs was the most cost-effective alternative to a new helicopter and would meet 80 percent of reconnaissance requirements, compared to 20 percent with existing OH-58s and 50 percent with upgraded OH-58s. National Guard units, who would lose their attack helicopters, criticized the proposal. In March 2015, the first heavy attack reconnaissance unit was formed with 24 Apaches and 12 Shadow UAVs.

AH-64 Apache in Kandahar Airbase

In July 2014, the Pentagon announced that Apaches had been dispatched to Baghdad to protect embassy personnel from Islamic State militant attacks. On 4 October 2014, Apaches began performing missions in Operation Inherent Resolve against Islamic State ground forces. In October 2014, U.S. Army AH-64s and Air Force fighters participated in four air strikes on Islamic State units northeast of Fallujah. In June 2016, Apaches were used in support of the Iraqi Army's Mosul offensive and provided support during the Battle of Mosul, sometimes flying night missions supporting Iraqi operations. In December 2019, two Apaches provided overwatch for U.S. Marines to secure the U.S. embassy in Baghdad, Iraq after armed militants, supported by Iran, attempted to storm the facility.

In March 2024, two Apache crashes within two days increased scrutiny.

On 30 April 2025, US Secretary of Defense Pete Hegseth ordered the Secretary of the Army to "end procurement of obsolete systems, and cancel or scale back ineffective or redundant programs, including manned aircraft, excess ground vehicles (e.g., HMMWV), and outdated UAVs." The Army said it would stop procuring AH-64s.

AH-64s were used in combat in the 2026 Iran war. On 9 June 2026, a US AH-64 was shot down in the Strait of Hormuz while on patrol. A US Naval Forces Central Command Task Force 59 Sea Drone was used to rescue the two-person crew. On the same day, the AH-64's downing was confirmed by President Trump to be caused by Iranian drone fire. Iran stated that it did not deliberately target the helicopter.

=== Israel ===
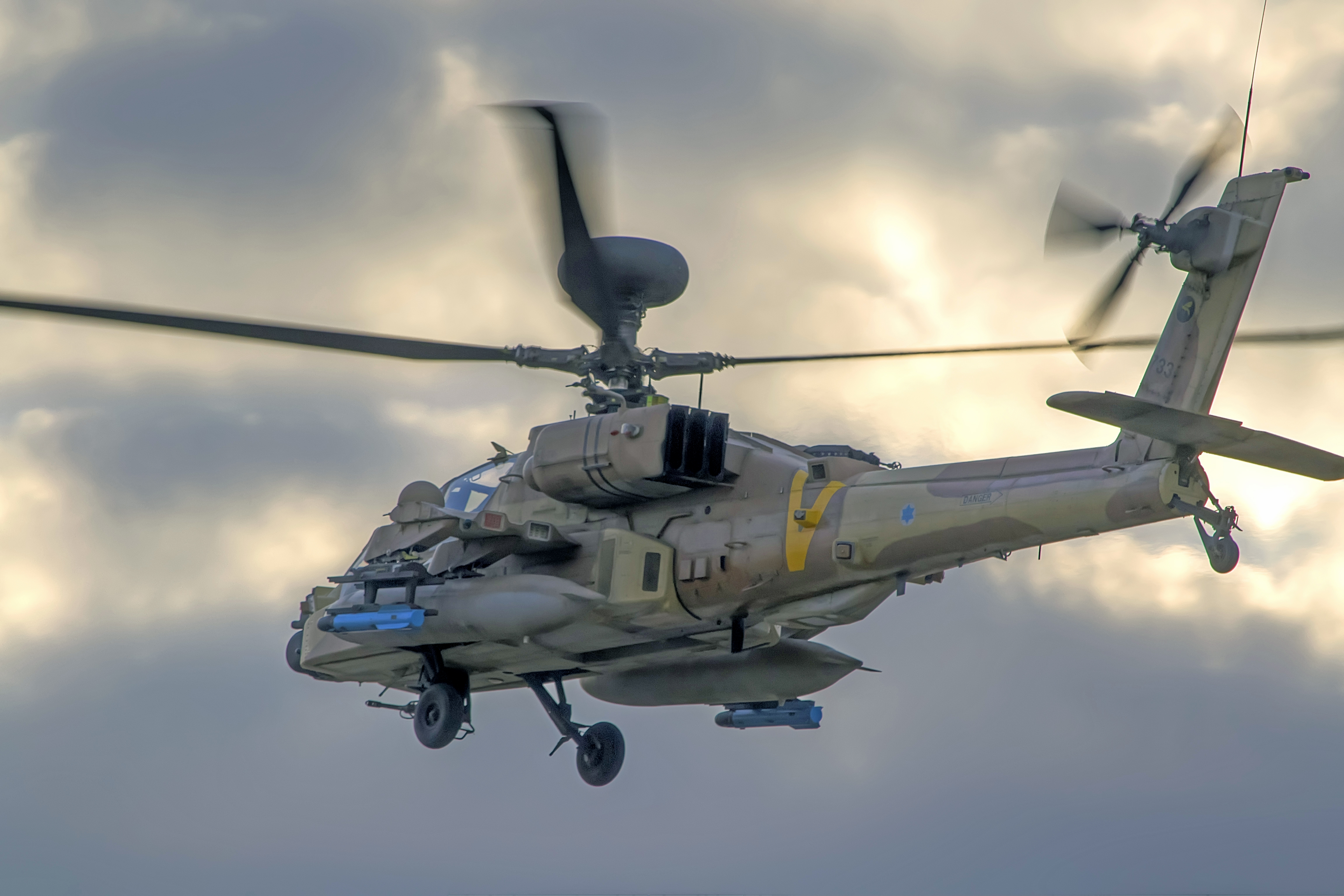
IAF AH-64D "Saraph"

The Israeli Air Force (IAF) first received AH-64As in 1990, for a fleet of 42 by 2000. The IAF's choice to buy Apaches over upgrading its AH-1 Cobra attack helicopters was controversial. In 2000, Israel was interested in acquiring up to 48 AH-64Ds, but U.S. reluctance to share the source code complicated the prospect. In April 2005, Boeing delivered the IAF's first AH-64D. In 2001, the U.S. government was allegedly investigating misuse of the Apache and other U.S.-supplied military equipment against Palestinians. In 2009, the sale of six AH-64Ds was reportedly blocked by the Obama Administration, pending interagency review, over concerns they may pose a threat to civilian Palestinians in Gaza. In IAF service, the AH-64A was named Peten (Hebrew: פתן, for Cobra (Note: Israel had already used "Tzefa" (צפע), Hebrew for Viper to name its Bell AH-1 Cobras. Donald 2004 states Peten translates to "Viper".)), while the AH-64D was named Saraph (Hebrew: שרף, for venomous/fiery winged serpent).

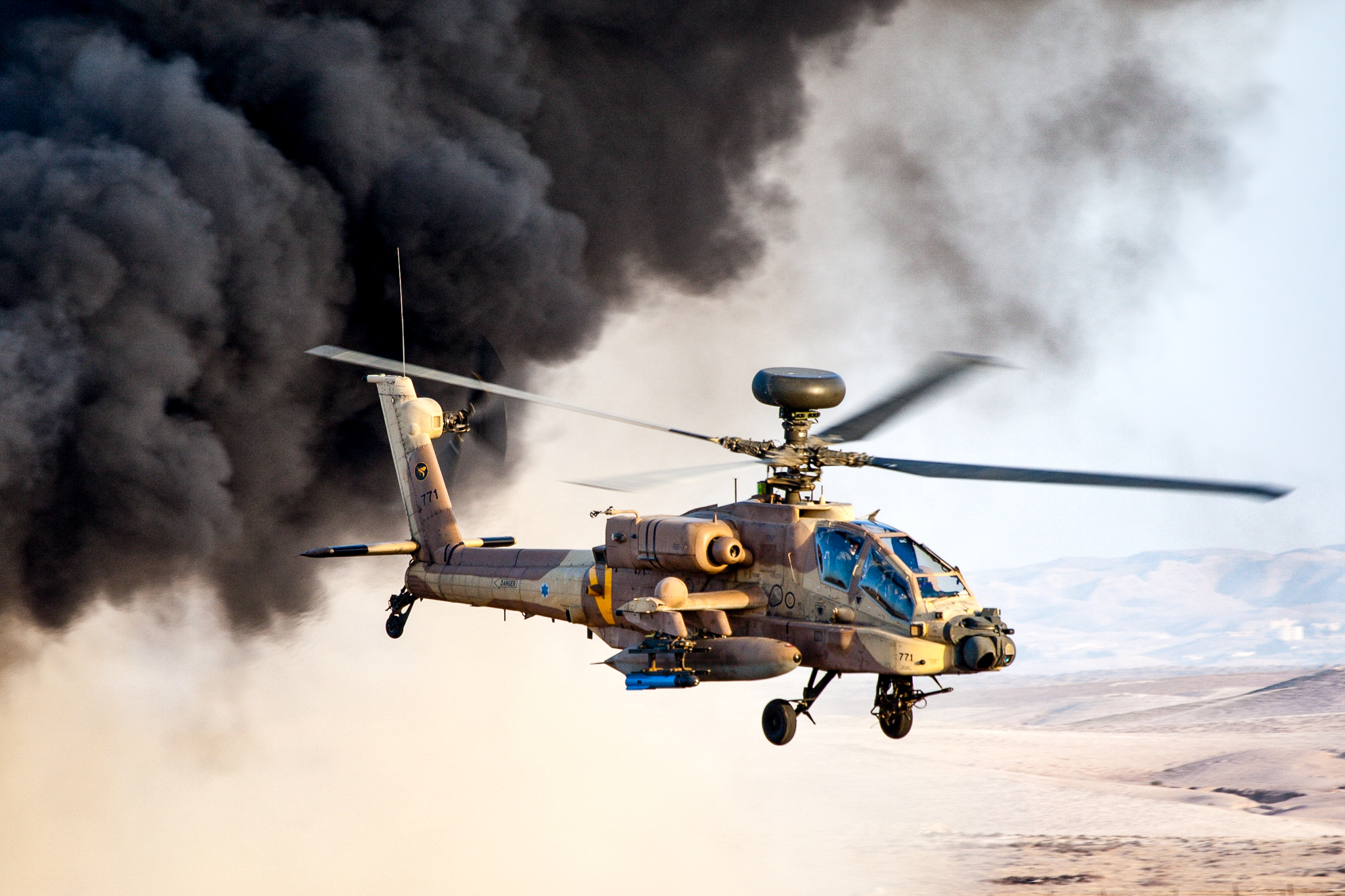
Israeli AH-64D

Israeli Apaches were used in the assassination of Abbas al-Musawi, the secretary-general of Hezbollah on 16 February 1992 in southern Lebanon, which was the first targeted killing by Israeli attack helicopters. During the 1990s, Israeli AH-64As frequently attacked Hezbollah outposts in Lebanon. On 13 April 1996, during Operation Grapes of Wrath, an Apache fired two Hellfire missiles at an ambulance in Lebanon, killing six civilians. During the al-Aqsa Intifada in the 2000s, AH-64s were used to kill senior Hamas figures, such as Ahmed Yassin, Abdel Aziz al-Rantisi, and Adnan al-Ghoul. Human Rights Watch documented instances of IAF Apaches attacking civilian homes during the 2002 Jenin operation, killing one civilian. Consequently, HRW urged the US government to seek written assurances from Israel that Apaches would not be used to violate humanitarian law in the future.

In 2004, Israeli AH-64s carried out the assassination of Ahmed Yassin and also killed 7 bystanders. Ahmed Yassin was the spiritual leader of Hamas; given that he was also blind, paraplegic and in a wheelchair, Palestinians saw the killing as "a cowardly execution of a frail old man in a wheelchair who did not attempt to hide". The attack also killed 7 bystanders, and was internationally condemned.

IAF Apaches played a prominent role in the 2006 Lebanon War, launching strikes into Lebanon targeting Hezbollah forces. IAF Apaches also attacked civilian targets, killing many, including women and children. During this war, two AH-64As collided, killing one pilot and critically wounding three. In another incident in the conflict, an IAF AH-64D crashed due to a main rotor malfunction, killing the two crew. In late 2007, the IAF put further purchases and deliveries of AH-64Ds on hold while its performance envelope was investigated. Israeli officials praised the Apache for its role in Operation Cast Lead in 2008, against Hamas in Gaza. IAF Apaches have often patrolled the skies over Gaza; strikes against insurgents by these helicopters has become a frequent occurrence.

In the 2010s, the IAF pursued upgrades to its AH-64A fleet as new AH-64D orders had been blocked. In June 2010, Israel decided not to upgrade all AH-64As to AH-64Ds due to funding constraints and lack of U.S. cooperation. In December 2010, the IAF was examining the adoption of a new missile system as a cheaper and lightweight complement to the Hellfire missile, either the American Hydra 70 or the Canadian CRV7. By 2013, IAF AH-64As were receiving a comprehensive upgrade of their avionics and electrical systems. The AH-64As are being upgraded to the AH-64Ai configuration, which is near the AH-64D standard. IAF Apaches can carry Spike anti-tank missiles instead of the Hellfire. The latest AH-64D-I integrates Israeli systems such as Elta communications suite, Elbit mission management system, Rafael Combat Net system and Elisra self-protection suite.

IAF AH-64s occasionally saw use in the air-to-air role. The first operational air-to-air kill took place on 24 May 2001, and notably against a manned aircraft, when an IAF Apache of the 127 Squadron used a Hellfire Missile to shoot down a Lebanese civilian Cessna 152 aircraft. Israeli and Lebanese officials presented differing versions: Lebanon said Israel first intercepted the aircraft over Lebanese airspace and its pilot, flying without his instructor, mistakenly entered Israeli airspace, while Israel says the aircraft was already in Israeli airspace when it was intercepted and repeatedly refused to answer or comply with air traffic control (ATC) warnings. The second air-to-air kill occurred on 10 February 2018, after an Iranian UAV entered Israeli airspace from Syria, an AH-64 destroyed it with a missile.

=== United Kingdom ===
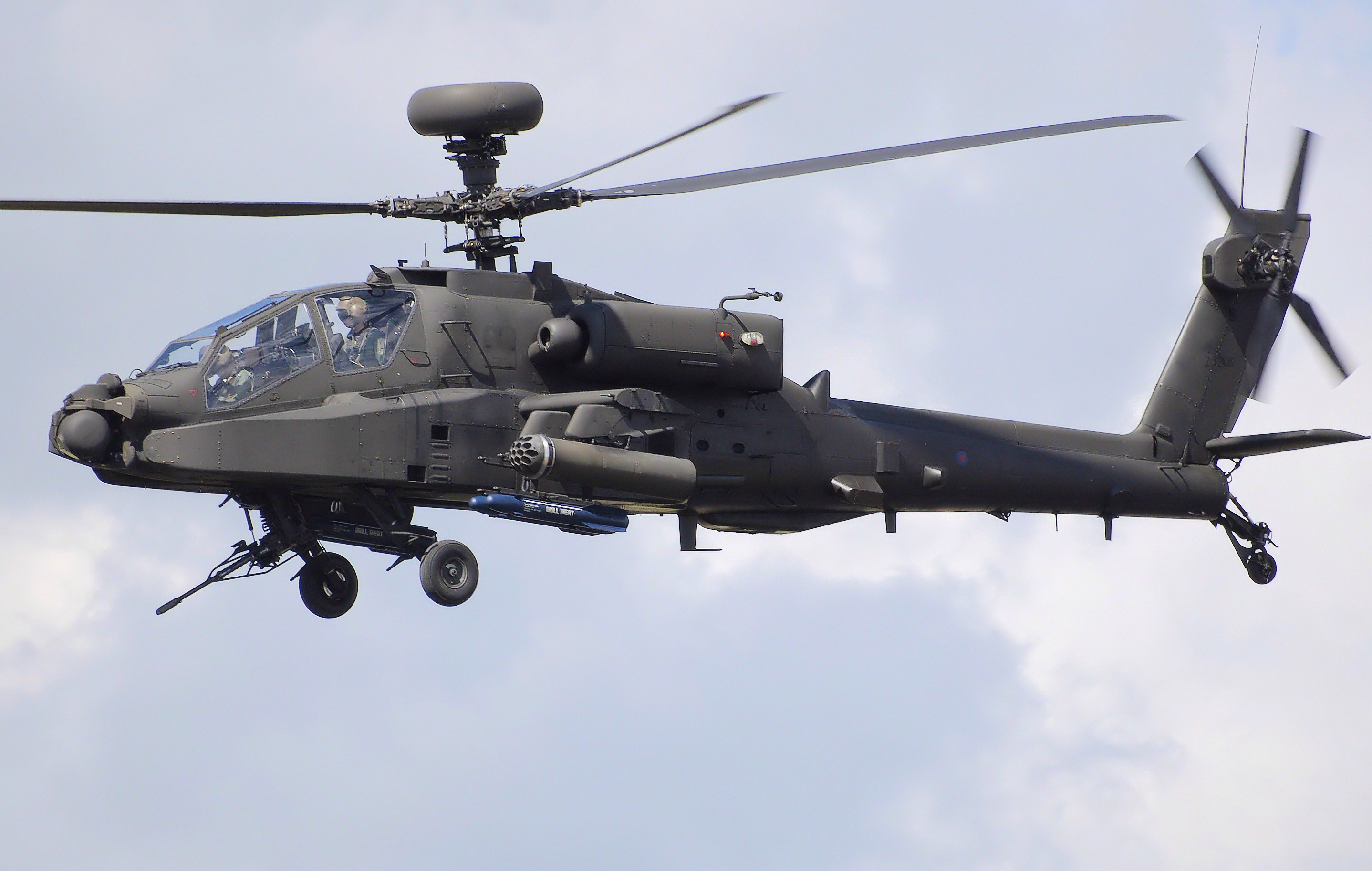
British Army Air Corps Westland WAH-64D Apache Longbow displays at a UK airshow

The UK previously operated a modified variant of the AH-64D Block I Apache Longbow; initially called the Westland WAH-64 Apache, it is designated the Apache AH1 by the British Army. Westland built 67 WAH-64 Apaches under license from Boeing, following a competition between the Eurocopter Tiger and the Apache for the British Army's new Attack Helicopter in 1995. Important deviations made by AgustaWestland from the U.S. Apache variants include changing to more powerful Rolls-Royce engines, and the addition of a folding blade assembly for use on naval ships.

On 11 July 2016, the Ministry of Defence confirmed a U.S. Foreign Military Sale (FMS) worth $2.3 billion (~$3.02 billion in 2025) for 50 AH-64Es to be built in Mesa, Arizona. Leonardo Helicopters in the UK will maintain the current fleet of Apaches until 2023–2024, with a long-term plan for Leonardo and other UK companies to "do most of the work" on the new fleet. The deal included an initial support contract for maintenance, spare parts, and training simulators; components from the older WAH-64s "will be reused and incorporated into the new helicopters where possible." The type entered service with the British Army in 2022. Approval for the re-manufacture of fifty of the UK's WAH-64 Mk 1 fleet to AH-64E Apache Guardian standard was given by the Defense Security Cooperation Agency in August 2015. They utilize the General Electric T700 engine rather than the Turbomeca RTM322 of the WAH-64; the first off-the-shelf purchase of a GE engine by the Ministry of Defence. The first two AH-64Es were delivered to the British Army on 26 November 2020. The older AH1 (WAH-64) were retired by 2024 in favour of the AH-64E models.

=== Netherlands ===
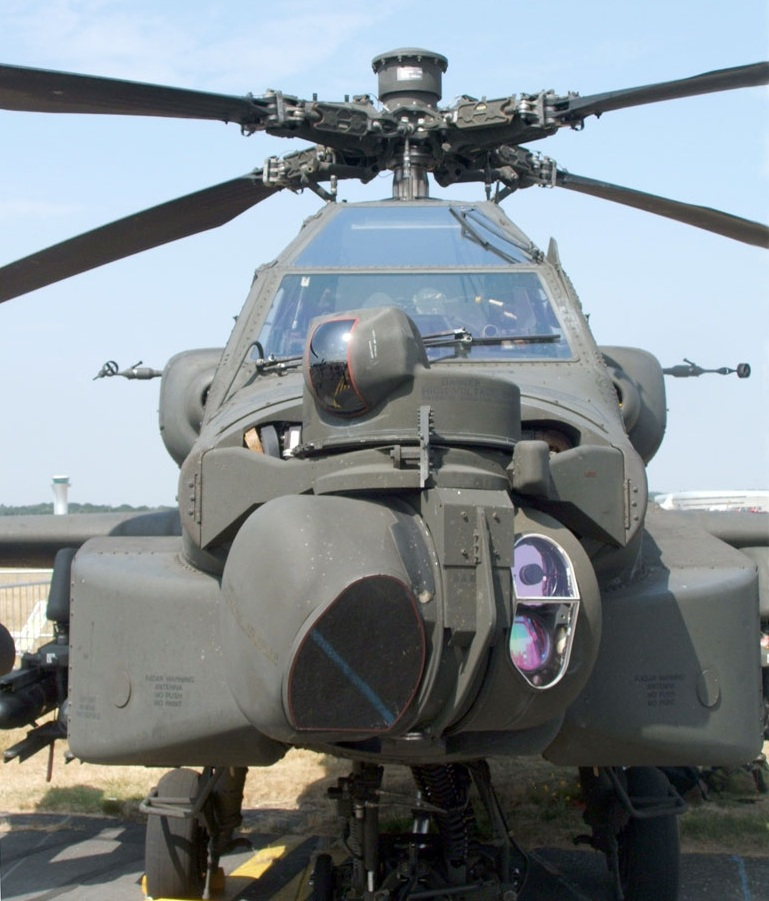
Royal Netherlands Air Force AH-64D at the Farnborough Airshow, 2006

The Dutch government initially showed an interest in acquiring Apache helicopters in the late 1980s, when it stated that it may purchase as many as 52. A competition held in 1994 against the Eurocopter Tiger and the Bell AH-1 SuperCobra led to the Royal Netherlands Air Force ordering 30 AH-64D Apaches in 1995. Deliveries began in 1998 and ended in 2002. The RNLAF Apaches are equipped with the Apache Modular Aircraft Survivability Equipment (AMASE) self-protection system to counter infrared (IR) missile threats.

The RNLAF Apaches' first deployment was in 2001 to Djibouti, Africa. They were also deployed alongside U.S. AH-64s in support of NATO peacekeeping forces in Bosnia and Herzegovina. In 2004, six Dutch AH-64s were deployed as part of the Netherlands contribution to the multinational force in Iraq to support the Dutch ground forces. The Apaches performed close combat support and display of force missions, along with providing reconnaissance information to ground forces. In February 2006, the Netherlands' contribution to NATO forces in Afghanistan was increased from 600 to 1,400 troops and six AH-64s were sent in support.

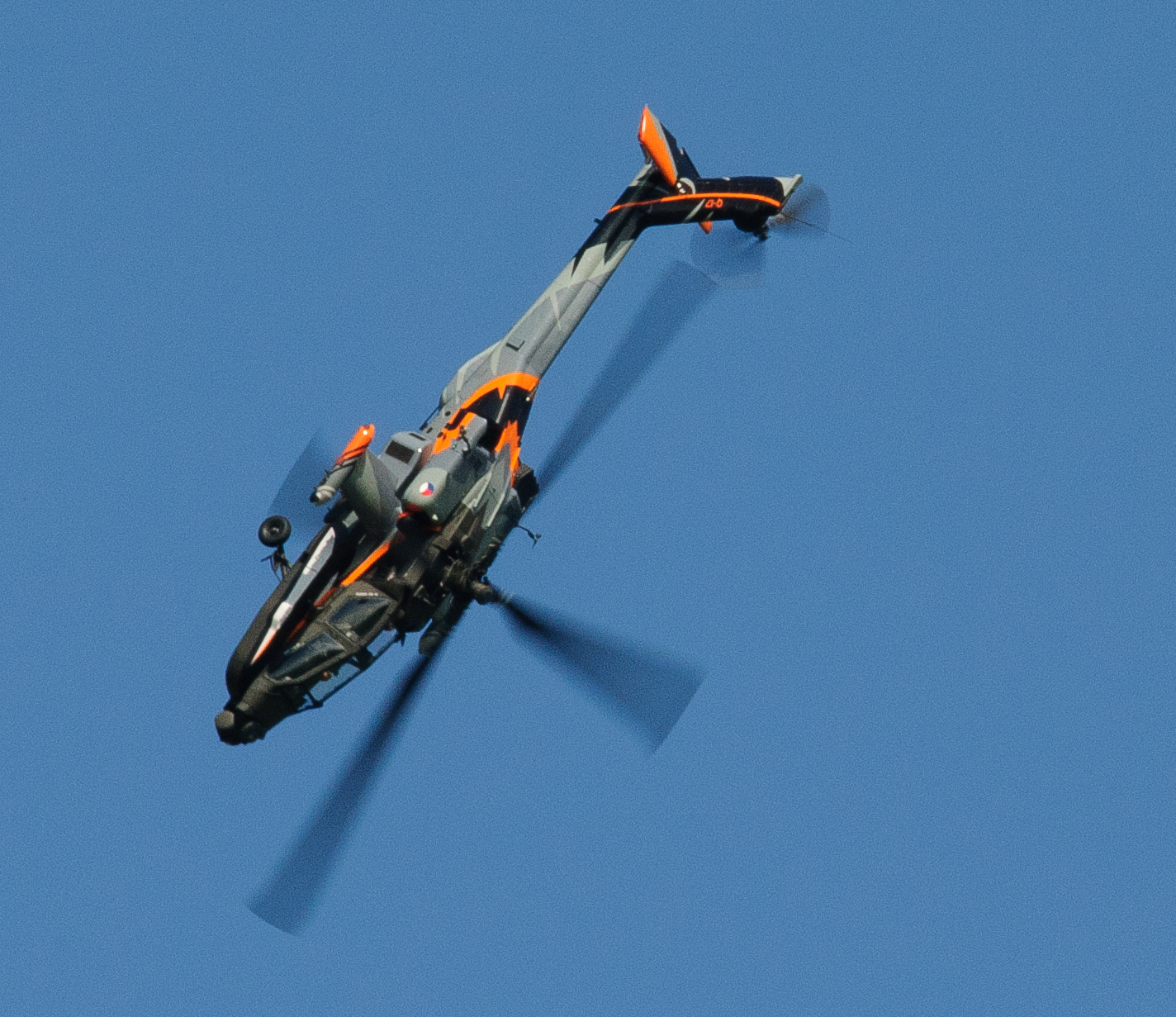
A Royal Netherlands Air Force AH-64D Apache from the Apache Solo Display Team

Shortly after Apaches were deployed to Hamid Karzai International Airport, as part of the Dutch contribution to ISAF, on 10 April 2004, a pair of Dutch Apaches came under light gunfire close to Kabul. On 17 December 2007, an RNLAF Apache flew into power lines during a night flying exercise in the Netherlands, forcing an emergency landing and causing a lengthy blackout in the region. On 17 March 2015, a RNLAF Apache crashed during a training mission in Mali. Both pilots died. The Ministry of Defence opened an investigation into the cause of the crash.

In February 2018, the Netherlands decided to upgrade all their AH-64Ds to the latest AH-64E standard via a FMS contract with the US, along with 17 APG-78 fire control radar units. In November 2021, the process to upgrade AH-64Ds began and RNLAF is to receive the upgraded AH-64Es between 2023 and 2025.

=== Saudi Arabia ===
Following the 1991 Gulf War, during which many U.S. Apaches operated from bases within Saudi territory, Saudi Arabia purchased twelve AH-64As for the Royal Saudi Land Force. It has been speculated that the Saudi purchase motivated Israel to also procure Apaches. In August 2006, Saudi Arabia began negotiations for Apache upgrades worth up to $400M (~$614 million in 2025), possibly remanufacturing their AH-64As to the AH-64D configuration. In September 2008, the U.S. Government approved a Saudi Arabian request to buy 12 AH-64Ds. In October 2010, Saudi Arabia requested a further 70 AH-64Ds as part of a possible massive arms deal.

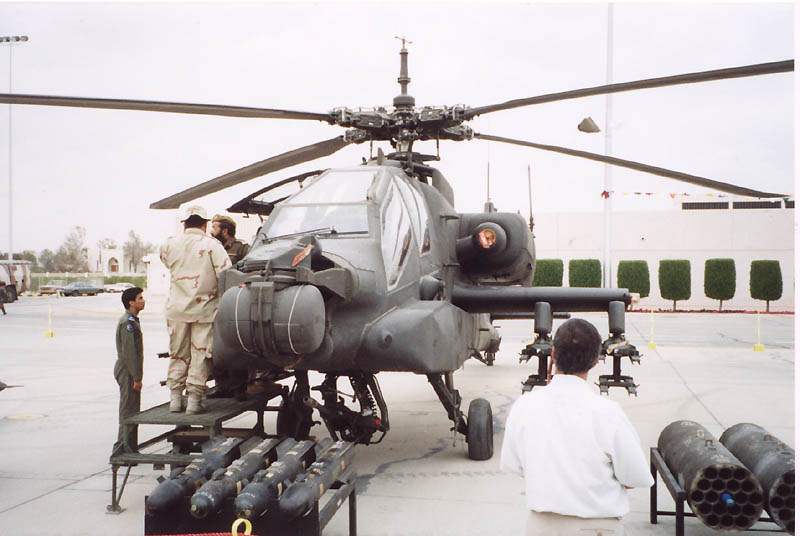
Royal Saudi Land Forces AH-64A, 2005

In November 2009, the Royal Saudi Land Force, as part of a military effort against insurgent border intrusions, launched Operation Scorched Earth; this involved Apaches launching air strikes against Houthi rebels operating inside neighboring Yemen. In January 2010 the rebels claimed to have shot down an Apache; this was denied by the Saudi military. In late January 2010, the leader of the Shiite rebels announced their withdrawal from Saudi territory, this announcement followed a key battle on 12 January when Saudi forces reportedly took control of the border village of Al Jabiri.

As an escalation of the Yemeni Civil War, starting on 26 March 2015, Saudi Arabia, the United Arab Emirates, and several other regional allies started a military operation in Yemen. Both the Saudi Army Aviation and the United Arab Emirates Air Force used their AH-64s in combat against an alliance between elements of the Yemeni Army loyal to the former president Saleh and the Houthis. The Apaches were mostly involved in border patrol and strikes in Northwestern Yemen. Over the years, several Saudi and an Emirati Apaches were lost to incidents and enemy fire, although exact numbers have not been independently confirmed. On 17 March 2017, an Apache reportedly attacked a Somali refugee boat, killing 42 refugees. Saudi Arabia denied involvement, though it and the United Arab Emirates are the only militaries using Apaches during the conflict.

=== United Arab Emirates ===
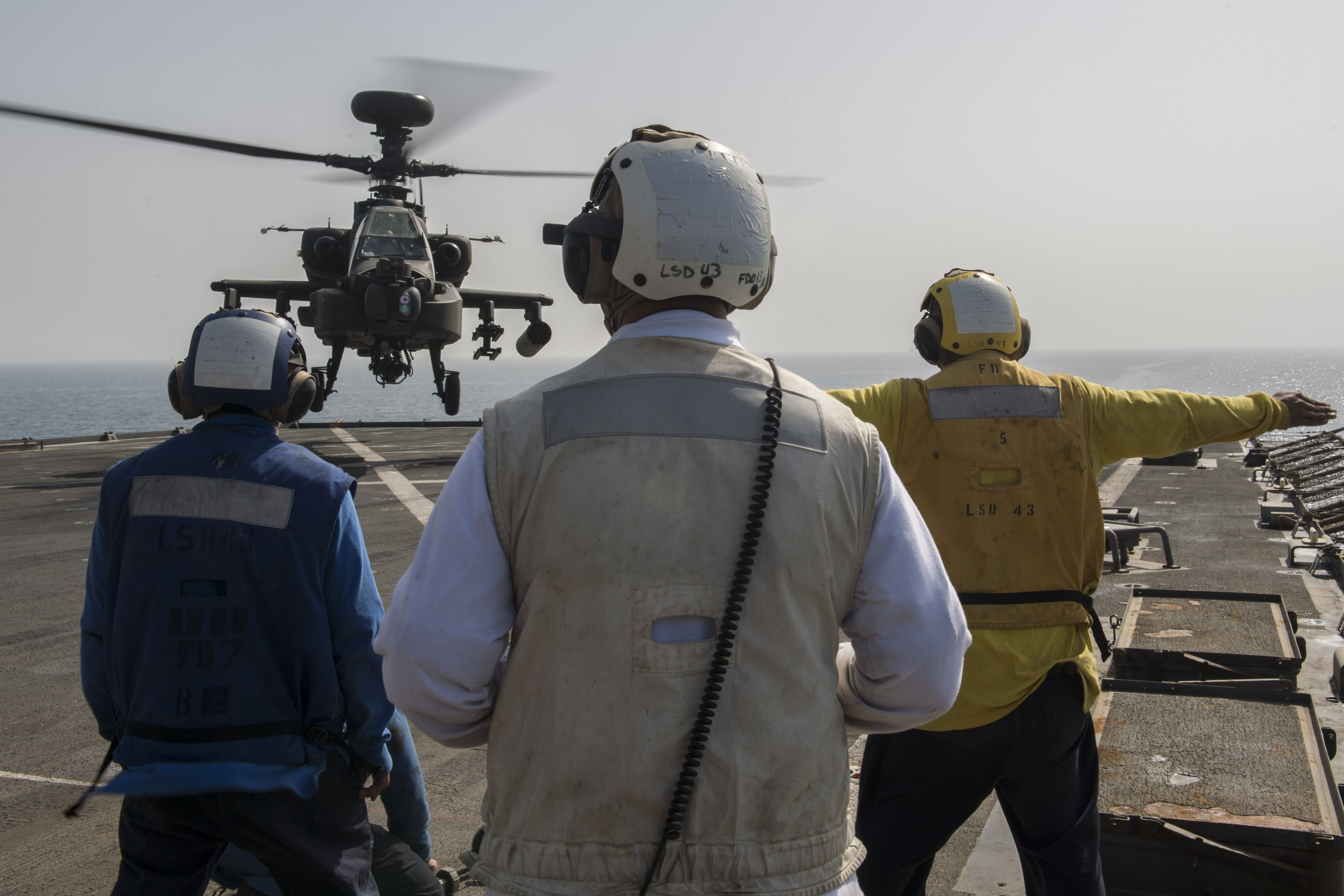
An UAEAF Apache conducts deck landing qualifications aboard the USS Fort McHenry.

The United Arab Emirates purchased 30 AH-64As between 1991 and 1994, and began upgrading to AH-64D specification in 2008. In December 2016, the U.S. State Department approved a proposed sale of another 37 AH-64Es and Congress was notified; this consisted of 28 re-manufactured and nine new-build helicopters.

A UAE AH-64 was reportedly lost on 17 October 2017; a replacement was approved by the US in 2019.

During the 2026 Iran war, the UAEAF's Apaches have been active in shooting down Iranian Shahed class drones launched at targets within the Emirates alongside Surface Fire and Emirati F-16s, scoring kills against them with their M230 cannons. One Apache was lost due to a technical malfunction during these operations on 9 March 2026, resulting in the loss of life of both crew members.

=== Egypt ===
In 1995, the Egyptian Air Force placed an order for 36 AH-64As. These Apaches were delivered with the same avionics as the U.S. fleet at that time, except for indigenous radio equipment. In 2000, Boeing announced an order to remanufacture Egypt's Apache fleet to the AH-64D configuration, except for Longbow radar, which had been excluded by the U.S. government. In 2009, Egypt requested a further 12 AH-64D Block IIs with Longbow radars through a FMS.

In August 2012, the Egyptian Armed Forces undertook a large-scale military operation to regain control of the Sinai Peninsula from armed militants. Air cover throughout the operation was provided by the Egyptian Air Force's Apaches, which reportedly destroyed three vehicles and killed at least 20 militants. Up to five Egyptian Apaches were temporarily stationed in the Sinai following an agreement between Egypt and Israel. In September 2015, an Egyptian Apache attacked a group of foreign tourists in the Western Desert, killing 12 people and injuring 10. The AH-64s fired at the civilians with rockets and 30mm machine guns for several hours, even though survivors said they waved the white flag. The Egyptian Interior Ministry stated that the group, who were mistaken for militants, was in a restricted area. The tourists were reportedly accompanied by Egyptian police, and their vehicles were marked with logos of the tourist company.

In November 2018, the U.S. Department of State approved the sale of ten AH-64Es and associated equipment to Egypt, valued at US$1 billion, pending the sale clearing Congress.

The Apache entered service with the Egyptian Armed Forces, and in the 2020s was being further upgraded.

=== India ===
==== Indian Air Force ====
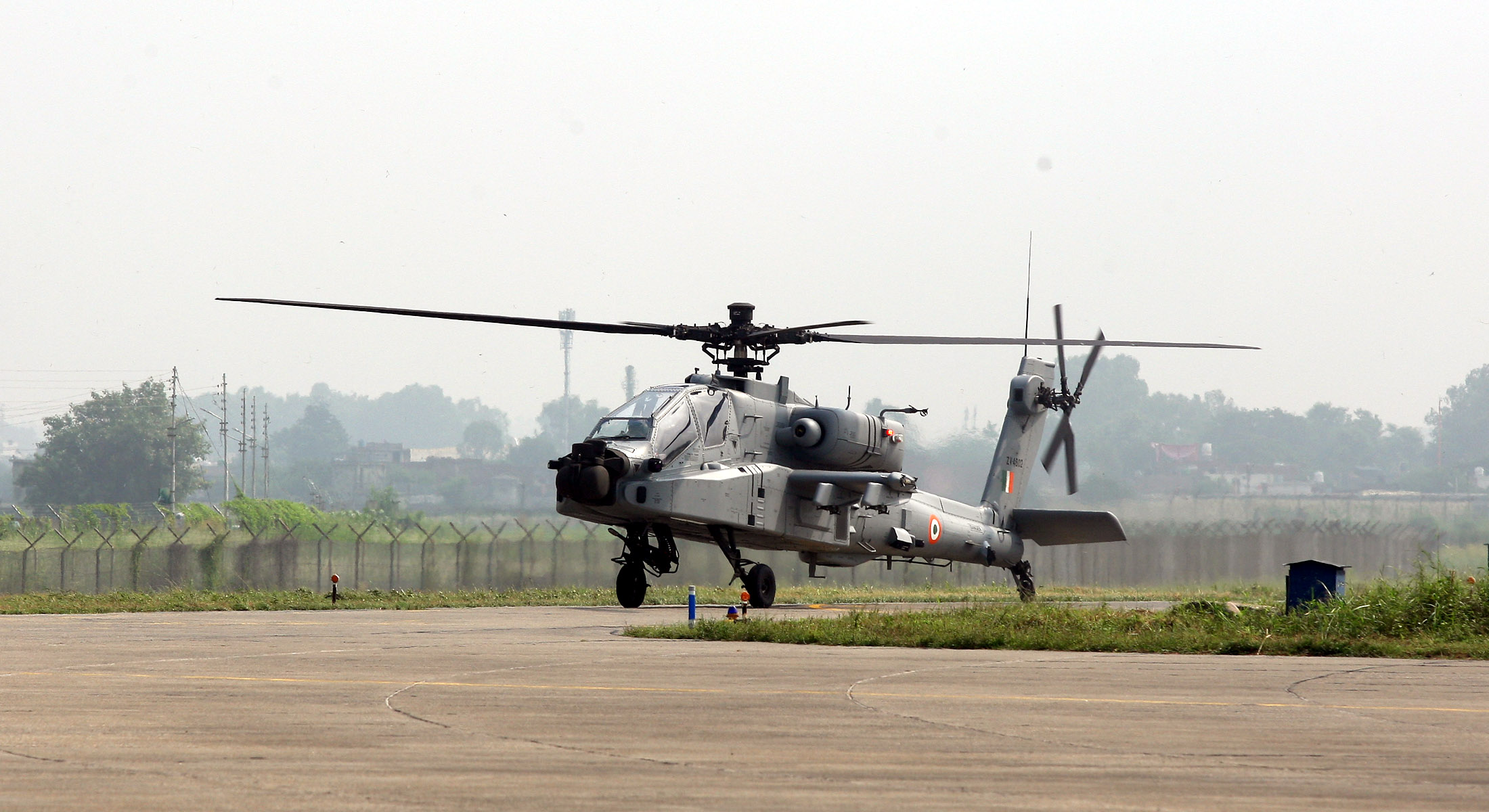
An IAF AH-64E in 2019

In 2008, the Indian Air Force (IAF) released a tender for 22 attack helicopters; there were six contending submissions: Sikorsky's UH-60 Black Hawk, the AH-64D, Bell's AH-1 Super Cobra, Eurocopter's Tiger, Mil's Mi-28 and AgustaWestland's A129 Mangusta. In October 2008, Boeing and Bell withdrew. In 2009, the competition was restarted. In December 2010, India requested the sale of 22 Apaches and associated equipment. On 5 October 2012, IAF Chief NAK Browne confirmed the Apache's selection. The IAF sought control of the 22 Apaches for air combat missions, while the Army Aviation Corps argued that they would be better used in army operations. In April 2013, the Indian Ministry of Defence decided that the 22 AH-64s would go to the IAF. India ordered the 22 AH-64Es in 2015.

On 11 May 2019, the IAF received its first AH-64E in a ceremony at Boeing's Mesa, Arizona facility. On 3 September 2019, 8 AH-64Es were inducted into the IAF's 125 Helicopter Squadron at Pathankot Air Force Station (AFS), Punjab. The second squadron for Apache helicopters, the 137 Helicopter Squadron was raised at Jorhat Air Force Station on 21 October 2019. Following the second batch of 8 helicopters, the last batch of 5 choppers were delivered on 11 July 2020.

The Apaches were also deployed at Leh Air Force Station during the 2020–2021 China–India skirmishes.

==== Indian Army ====
On 12 June 2018, the U.S. Department of State approved a possible Foreign Military Sale to India for six more AH-64Es and associated equipment in an estimated $930 million deal. The U.S. Defense Security Cooperation Agency notified Congress for approval. In February 2020, another six for the Indian Army were ordered, including weapons, equipment, and training; deliveries are planned to begin in 2023. These helicopters are often interlinked with squadrons of indigenous HAL Prachand attack helicopters.

In August 2022, it was reported that the Army has made a case to purchase the remaining 11 Apache of the 39 helicopters that was originally sanctioned by the Cabinet Committee on Security. It was under this approval, that the IAF and IA acquired 22 and six AH-64s in September 2015 and February 2020, respectively.

On 1 January 2024, senior Army officials told India Today that the Indian Army Aviation Corps is expected to induct the first batch of Apache helicopters in the February–March timeframe. This is would enable the army to protect its tanks on the battlefield when the Air Force fleet is unavailable. They would be deployed to Jodhpur, near the India–Pakistan border, enhancing the security of the area against Pakistani tanks. On 15 March 2024, Army Aviation Corps raised the 451 Army Aviation squadron at Jodhpur which will operate Apaches. The induction of the first batch of three Apaches was scheduled in May 2024, with the rest by July 2024. However, until August 2024, no Apaches were delivered to the Army.

The first three helicopters, sporting the desert camouflage, arrived in India's Hindan Air Force Station on 22 July onboard a US cargo aircraft. The helicopter entered service with the Army and saw its maiden deployment during Exercise Maru Jwala on 11 November 2025.

The final batch was received at Hindan Air Force Station on 17 December 2025 and is now expected to be inducted into service in the same month following final assembly, joint inspection and completion of formalities. They will be eventually stationed at Nagtalao Army Aviation Base, Jodhpur, after joining 451 Army Aviation Squadron. In April 2026, Indian Army Apaches conducted live firing drills using their cannons and AGM-113 Hellfire missiles during Exercise Brahmastra.

=== Other users ===
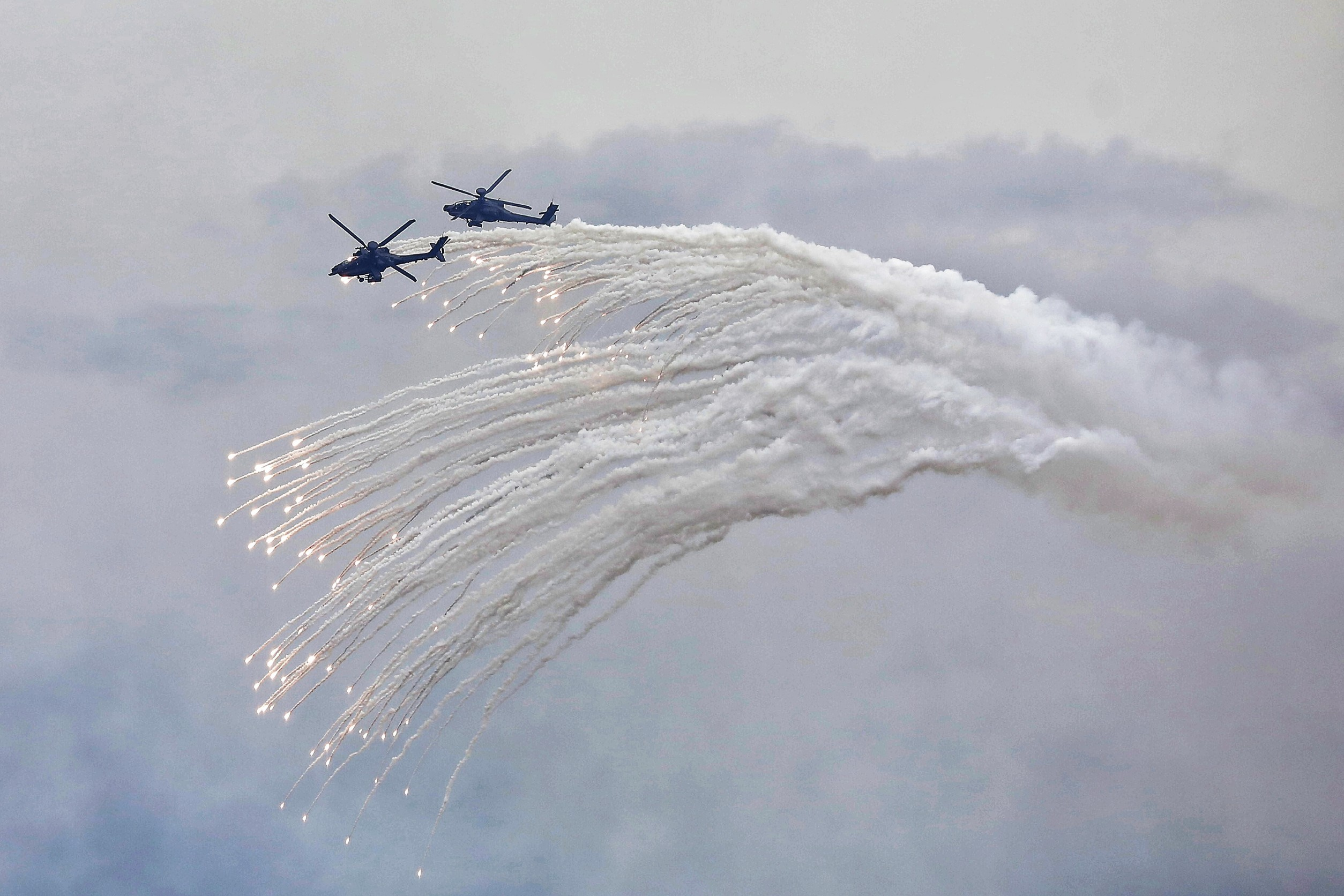
Two Republic of China Army AH-64Es deploying flares, 2020

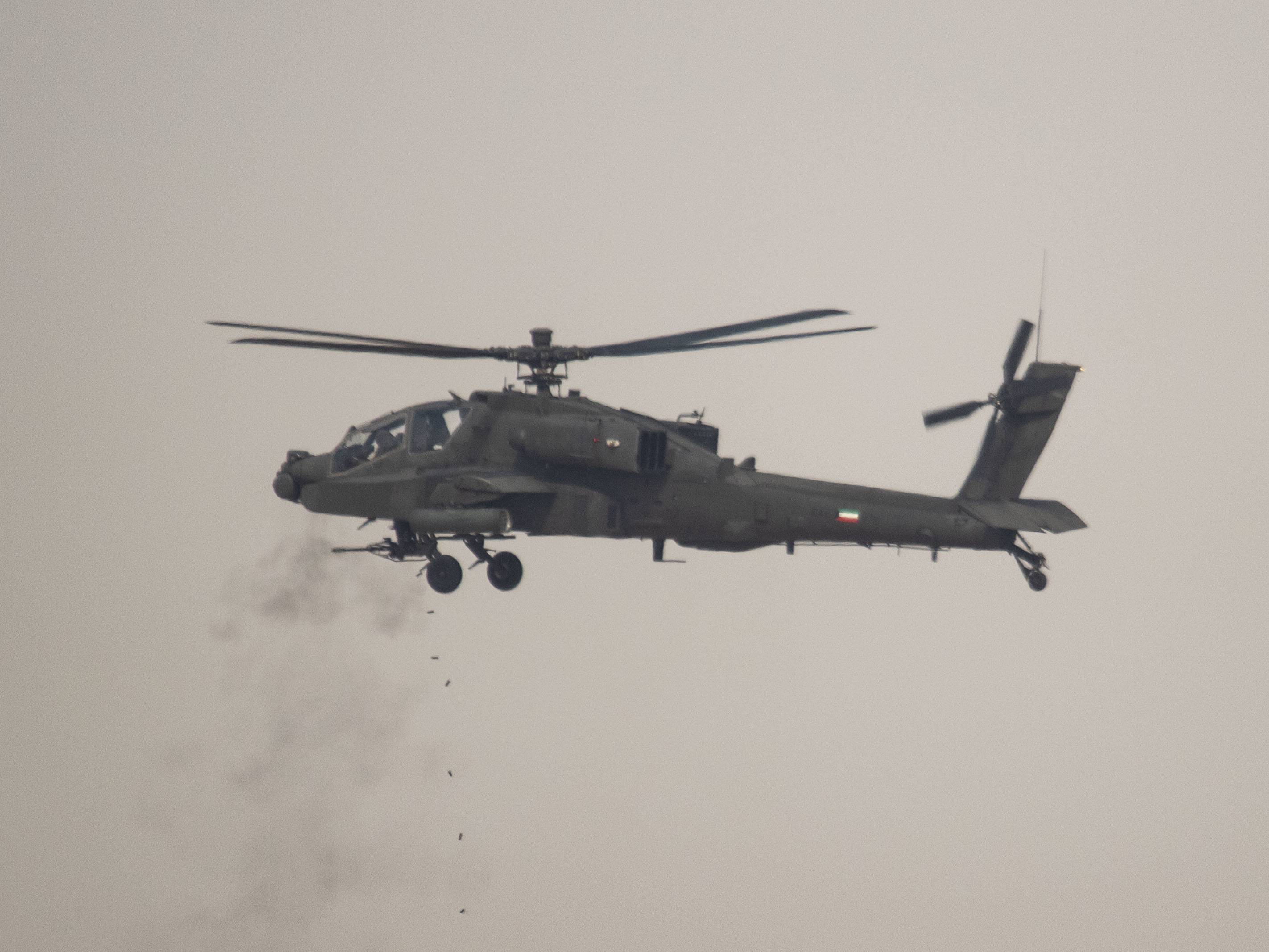
Kuwait Land Force AH-64 on a live fire exercise

Greece received 20 AH-64As by 1995; another 12 AH-64Ds were ordered in September 2003.

Singapore purchased 20 AH-64Ds in two batches between 1999 and 2001. In October 2010, training was suspended following the forced crash-landing of an Apache.

In 2005, Kuwait purchased 16 AH-64Ds.

On 26 August 2013, Indonesia and the U.S. finalized a contract for eight AH-64E Apaches worth $500 million (~$680 million in 2025). The first was displayed on 5 October 2017 as part of a military exercise in Indonesia, to mark the 72nd anniversary of its armed forces. The first batch of AH-64s for the Indonesian Army arrived in Indonesia on 18 December 2017.

Japan ordered 50 AH-64Ds, which were built under license by Fuji Heavy Industries, designated "AH-64DJP". The first helicopter was delivered to the JGSDF in early 2006. The order was halted after 13 aircraft were delivered due to cost. In 2017, it was announced that the targeting systems of the 13 aircraft would be upgraded. One was destroyed in a crash in February 2018 with the deaths of both crew.

In June 2011, Taiwan (Republic of China) agreed to the purchase of 30 AH-64Es with weapons and associated equipment. On 5 November 2013, Taiwan received the first six AH-64s. On 25 April 2014, a Taiwanese AH-64E crashed into a three-story building during a training flight in bad weather conditions, the first AH-64E airframe loss. An investigation ruled out mechanical failure and concluded that the pilots had rapidly descended through clouds at low altitude without checking flight instruments to maintain adequate height; the Army expanded simulator training in response.

In 2009, South Korea showed interest in the Apache, potentially related to plans to withdraw many U.S. Apaches from the country. On 21 September 2012, the U.S. Congress was notified of the possible purchase of 36 AH-64E, along with associated equipment and armament. It competed against the Bell AH-1Z Viper and the TAI/AgustaWestland T-129; in April 2013, South Korea announced plans to buy 36 AH-64Es.

In July 2012, Qatar requested the sale of 24 AH-64Es with associated equipment and support. The sale was approved on 27 March 2014. In March 2019, Qatar received the first of 24 AH-64Es ordered.

=== Future and possible users ===
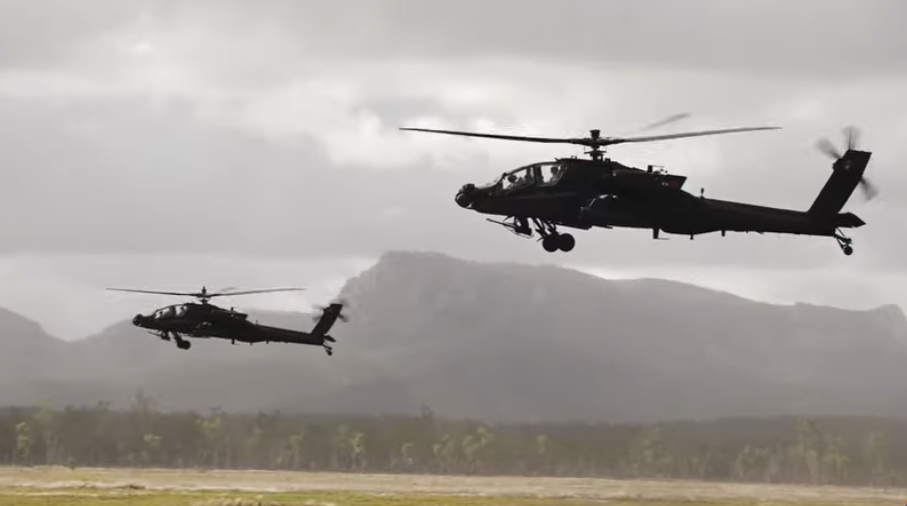
Two US Army Apaches during Exercise Talisman Sabre 2019, in Queensland, Australia

Iraq requested the sale of 24 AH-64s in April 2013; In January 2014, a sale, including the helicopters, associated parts, maintenance, and training, was cleared by the U.S. Congress. However, the proposal was not accepted by the Iraqi government and expired in August 2014.

In July 2016, the UK placed an order for 50 AH-64Es through the U.S. FMS program instead of upgrading their Westland-built WAH-64s.

In July 2019, Australia issued a request for information for Project Land 4503 to replace the Army's Eurocopter Tiger ARH helicopters. On 15 January 2021, the Australian Minister for Defence Linda Reynolds announced that the AH-64E had been selected to replace the Tiger ARH. A fleet of 29 AH-64Es will be acquired with a planned initial operational capability of 12 helicopters in 2026 and full operational capability in 2028.

In October 2019, the Bangladesh Air Force (BAF) was offered two types of attack helicopters and selected the AH-64, pending government approval. However, due to the Apache's high costs, the BAF choose the competing Russian Mi-28NE Night Hunter.

In November 2019, the U.S. State Department approved a FMS to Morocco of 24 AH-64Es (with an option for a further 12), this allows Morocco to negotiate an order.

On 30 April 2020, the U.S. Defense Security Cooperation Agency announced it had received U.S. State Department approval and notified Congress of a possible sale to the Philippines of either six AH-1Z attack helicopters and related equipment for an estimated cost of $450 million or six AH-64Es and related equipment for an estimated cost of $1.5 billion.

On 21 April 2022, Polish Ministry of National Defence shortlisted two models in competition for the "Kruk" (Raven) Program aimed at modernizing the Polish Land Forces' fleet of attack helicopters, with the competitors being the AH-64E and Bell's AH-1Z Viper. On 8 September 2022, Polish Minister of Defence Mariusz Błaszczak announced that the AH-64E has won and set out to procure 96 helicopters to form six squadrons. The contract includes a logistics package and a training package along with a stock of ammunition and spare parts.

== Variants ==
=== AH-64A ===
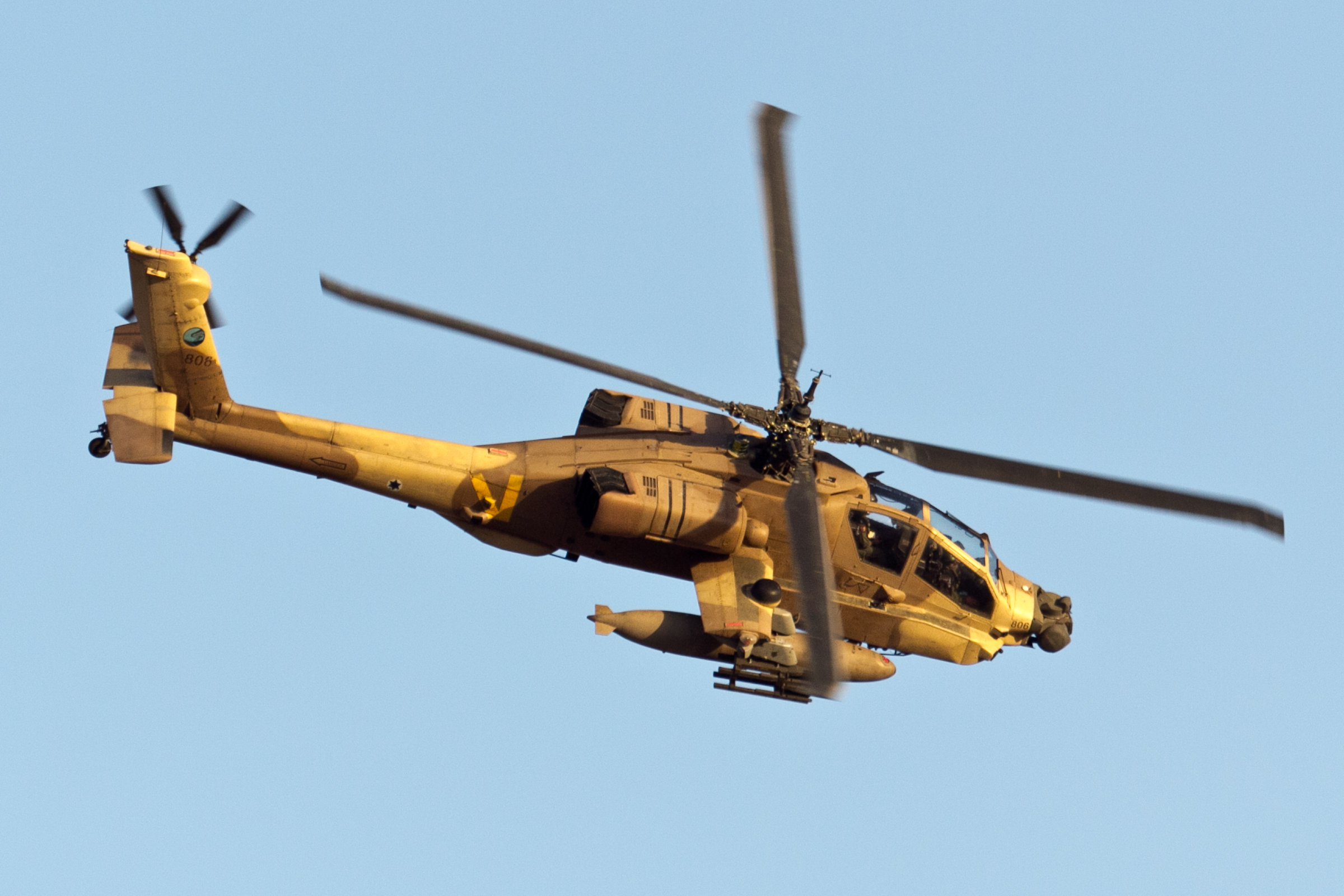
Israeli Air Force AH-64A Peten

The AH-64A is the original production attack helicopter. The crew sit in tandem in an armored compartment. It is powered by two GE T700 turboshaft engines. The A-model was equipped with the −701 engine variant until 1990 when the engines were switched to the more powerful −701C variant.

U.S. Army AH-64As are being converted to AH-64Ds. The service's last AH-64A was taken out of service in July 2012 before conversion at Boeing's facility in Mesa, Arizona. On 25 September 2012, Boeing received a $136.8M contract to remanufacture the last 16 AH-64As into the AH-64D Block II variant and this was planned to be completed by December 2013.

=== AH-64B ===
In 1991, after Operation Desert Storm, the AH-64B was a proposed upgrade to 254 AH-64As. The upgrade would have included new rotor blades, a Global Positioning System (GPS), improved navigation systems, and new radios. U.S. Congress approved $82M to begin the Apache B upgrade. The B program was canceled in 1992. The radio, navigation, and GPS modifications were later installed on most AH-64As via other upgrades.

=== AH-64C ===
Additional funding from Congress in late 1991 resulted in a program to upgrade the AH-64As to an AH-64B+ variant. More funding changed the plan to upgrade to AH-64C, which would include all of the changes to be included in the AH-64D except for mast-mounted radar and newer −700C engine variants. However, the C designation was dropped after 1993. With AH-64As receiving the newer engine from 1990, the only difference between the AH-64C and the AH-64D was the radar, which could be moved from one aircraft to another; thus, the decision was made to simply designate both variants as AH-64D.

=== AH-64D ===
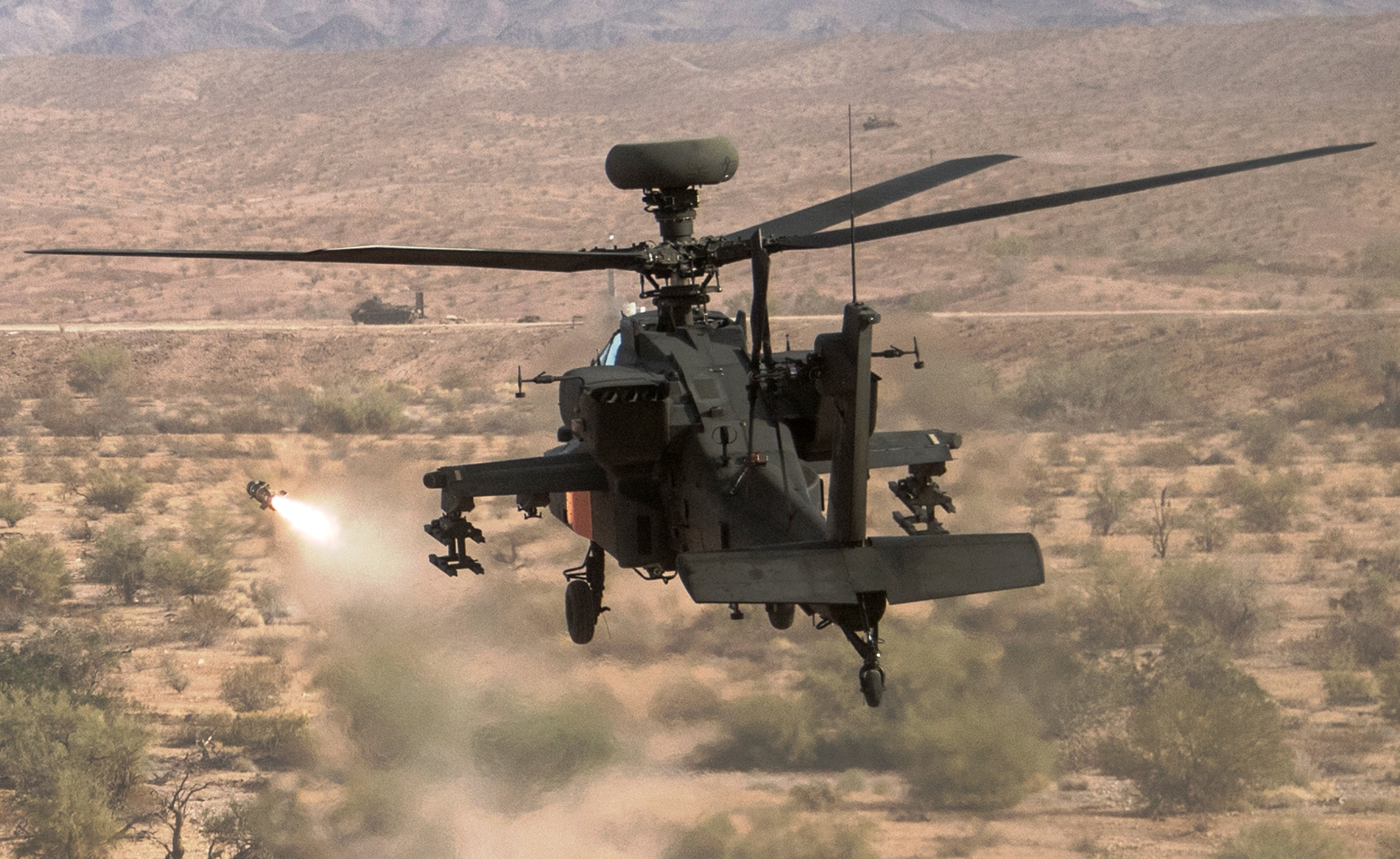
An AH-64D tests the AGM-179 JAGM at the Yuma Proving Ground

The AH-64D Apache Longbow is equipped with a glass cockpit and advanced sensors, the most noticeable of which being the AN/APG-78 Longbow millimeter-wave fire-control radar (FCR) target acquisition system and the Radar Frequency Interferometer (RFI), housed in a dome located above the main rotor. The radome's raised position enables target detection while the helicopter is behind obstacles (e.g. terrain, trees or buildings). The AN/APG-78 is capable of simultaneously tracking up to 128 targets and engaging up to 16 at once; an attack can be initiated within 30 seconds. A radio modem integrated with the sensor suite allows data to be shared with ground units and other Apaches, allowing them to fire on targets detected by a single helicopter.

The aircraft is powered by a pair of uprated T700-GE-701C engines. The forward fuselage was expanded to accommodate new systems to improve survivability, navigation, and 'tactical internet' communications capabilities. In February 2003, the first Block II Apache was delivered to the U.S. Army, featuring digital communications upgrades. The Japanese Apache AH-64DJP variant is based on the AH-64D; it can be equipped with the AIM-92 Stinger air-to-air missiles for self-defense.

=== AH-64E ===
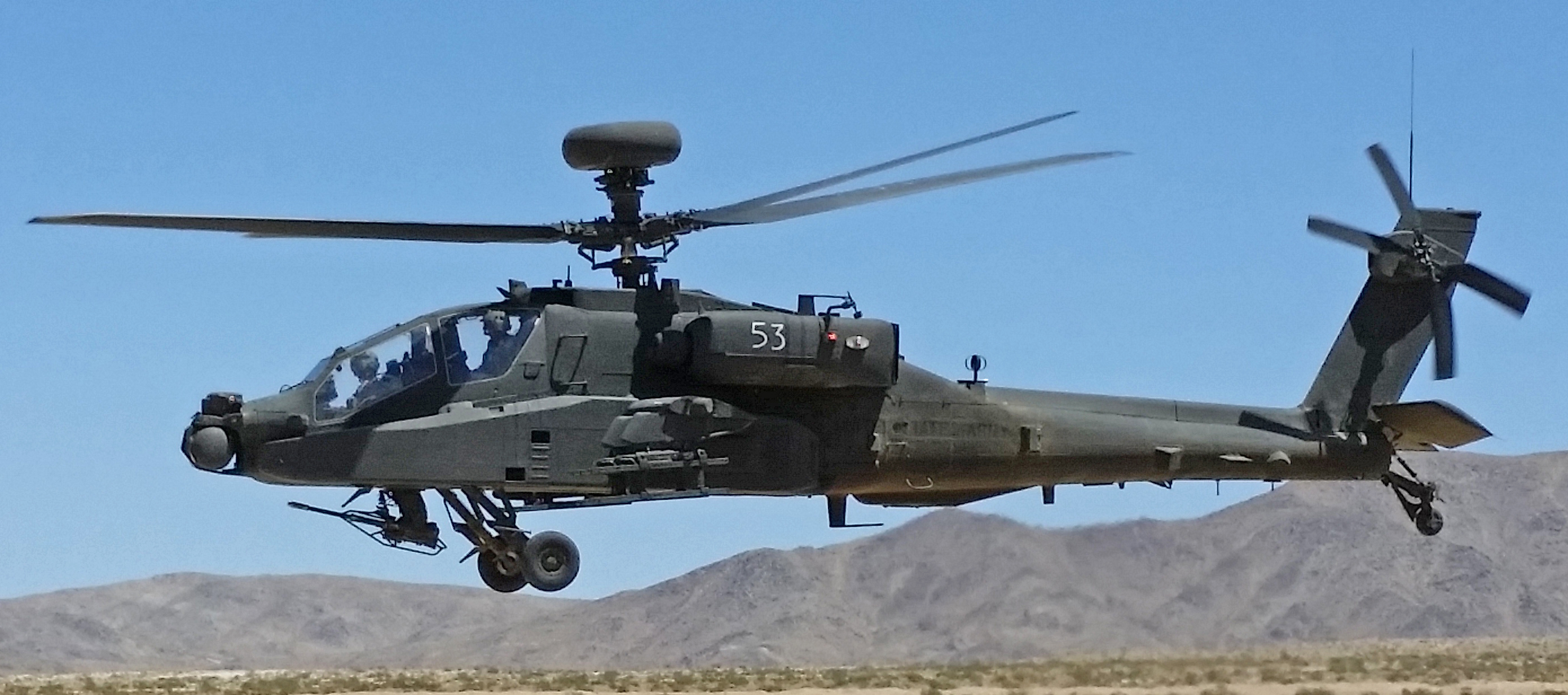
AH-64E Apache Guardian

In 2012, the AH-64D Block III was redesignated the AH-64E Guardian. Compared to earlier variants, it has better digital connectivity via the Joint Tactical Information Distribution System, controlling and exchanging data and video with UAVs on the C, D, L, and Ku frequency bands, via an L-3 Communications MUMT-X datalink that replaced two older counterparts. Its T700-GE-701D engines offer more power along with an upgraded face gear transmission to handle it. It has full IFR capability and better landing gear. Composite rotor blades that completed testing in 2004 increased cruise speed, climb rate, and payload capacity.

Deliveries began in November 2011. In 2013, production lots 4 through 6 added a cognitive-decision-aiding system and self-diagnostic abilities. The AH-64E is fit for maritime use; its updated Longbow radar can operate over open water. An AESA radar was under consideration. In 2015, the U.S. Army expressed interest in extended-range fuel tanks. From 2021 to 2023, the US Army worked a version 6.5 upgrade to the AH-64E. By April 2020, 500 AH-64Es had been delivered. In 2024, the US Army aimed to buy 812 new and rebuilt AH-64Es. Also in 2024, the AH-64E reportedly had electric generator issues.

=== AH-64F ===
In 2014, Boeing conceptualized an Apache upgrade before the introduction of the U.S. Army's anticipated attack variant of the Future Vertical Lift (FVL) aircraft, forecast to replace the Apache by 2040. The conceptual AH-64F would have greater speed via a new 3,000 shp turboshaft engine from the Improved Turbine Engine Program, retractable landing gear, stub wings to offload lift from the main rotor during cruise, and a tail rotor that can articulate 90 degrees to provide forward thrust. In October 2016, the Army revealed they would not pursue another Apache upgrade to focus on funding FVL; the Army will continue buying the Apache through the 2020s until Boeing's production line ends in 2026, then FVL is slated to come online in 2030.

=== Piasecki Speed Apache ===
In the late 1990s, Piasecki conceived a proposal for an Apache with a tail–mounted ducted pusher rotor to enhance speed. However, the Speed Apache was not proceeded with. This appears to be similar to the Piasecki X-49 SpeedHawk.

=== Compound Apache ===
In October 2018, Boeing began testing the AH-64E Block 2 Compound, a compound helicopter design which added a larger fixed wing and a pusher propeller to the Apache airframe to provide additional lift and thrust, respectively. In addition, the engine exhaust was redirected downwards. Collectively, the modifications were anticipated to improve speed to 185 kn (343 km/h; 213 mph), range to 460 nmi (850 km; 530 mi), payload to 5,900 lb (2,700 kg), and fuel economy. A 30% scale model completed wind tunnel testing in January 2019. The Compound Apache has been pitched as an interim replacement for the Apache before its replacement under the Future Vertical Lift program.

=== Sea Apache ===
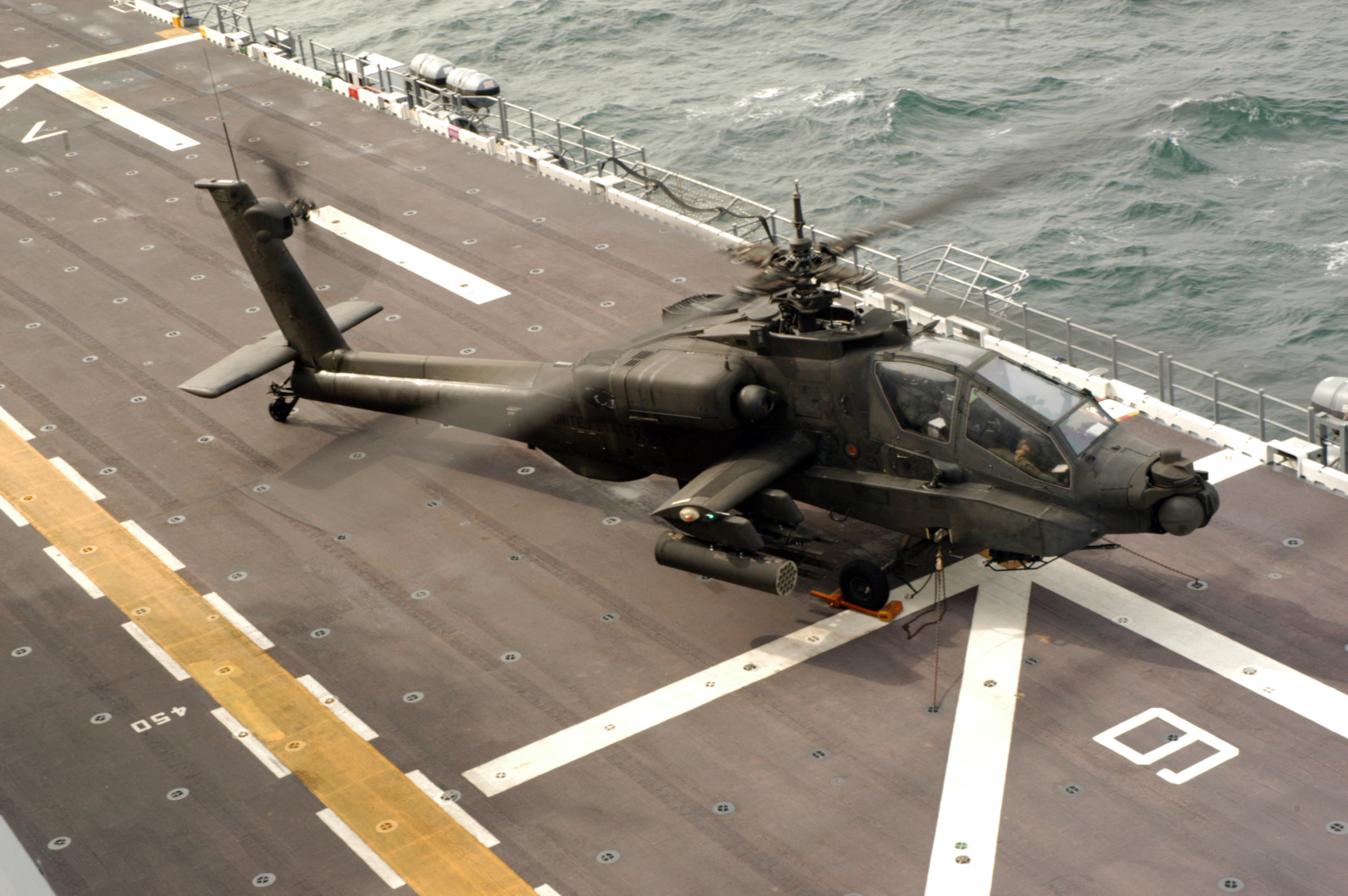
A U.S. Army AH-64A Apache aboard USS Nassau during Joint Shipboard Weapons and Ordnance training

During the 1980s, naval variants of the AH-64A for the United States Marine Corps and Navy were examined. Multiple concepts were studied with altered landing gear arrangements, improved avionics and weapons. The USMC conducted a two-week evaluation of the Apache in September 1981, including shipboard operation tests. Funding for a naval variant was not provided; the USMC continued to use the AH-1.

The Canadian Forces Maritime Command also examined naval Apaches. In 2004, British Army AgustaWestland Apaches were deployed upon the Royal Navy's HMS Ocean, a Landing Platform Helicopter, for suitability testing; there was U.S. interest in the trials. During the 2011 military intervention in Libya, the British Army extensively used Apaches from HMS Ocean. In 2013, US AH-64Ds were tested on several U.S. Navy ships.

=== Export Apaches ===
Several models have been derived from the AH-64A, AH-64D and AH-64E for export. The British-built AgustaWestland Apache (assembled from kits purchased from Boeing) is based on the AH-64D Block I with several different systems, including more powerful engines, folding rotor blades, and other modifications for operation from Royal Navy vessels.

=== Block modification ===
While a major change in design or role will cause the type designator suffix to change, for example from AH-64D to AH-64E, the helicopters are also subject to block modification. Block modification is the combining of equipment changes into blocks of modification work orders, the modifications in the block (sometimes called a block package) are all done to the helicopter at the same time.

== Operators ==
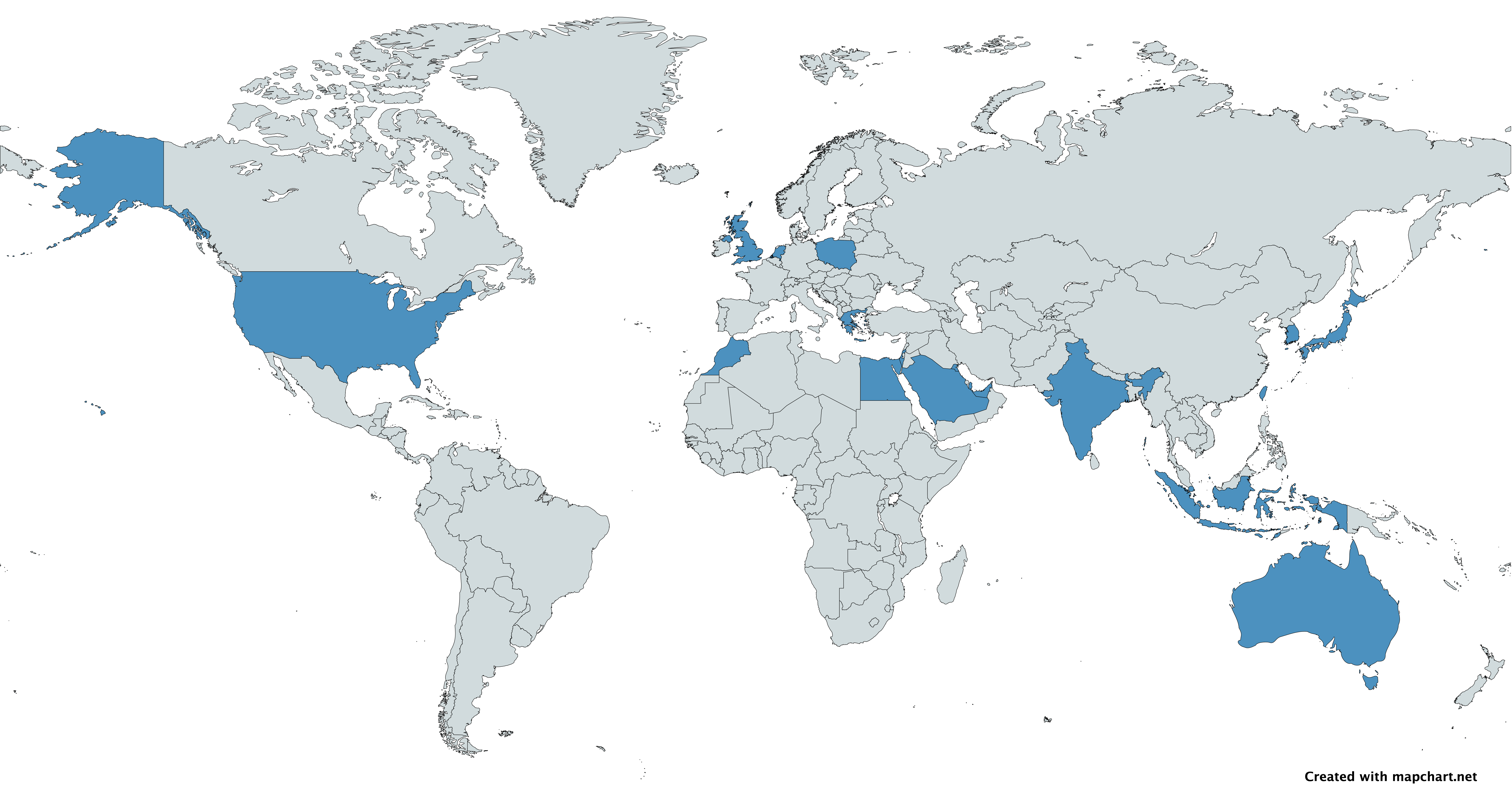
Map with AH-64 Apache operators in blue

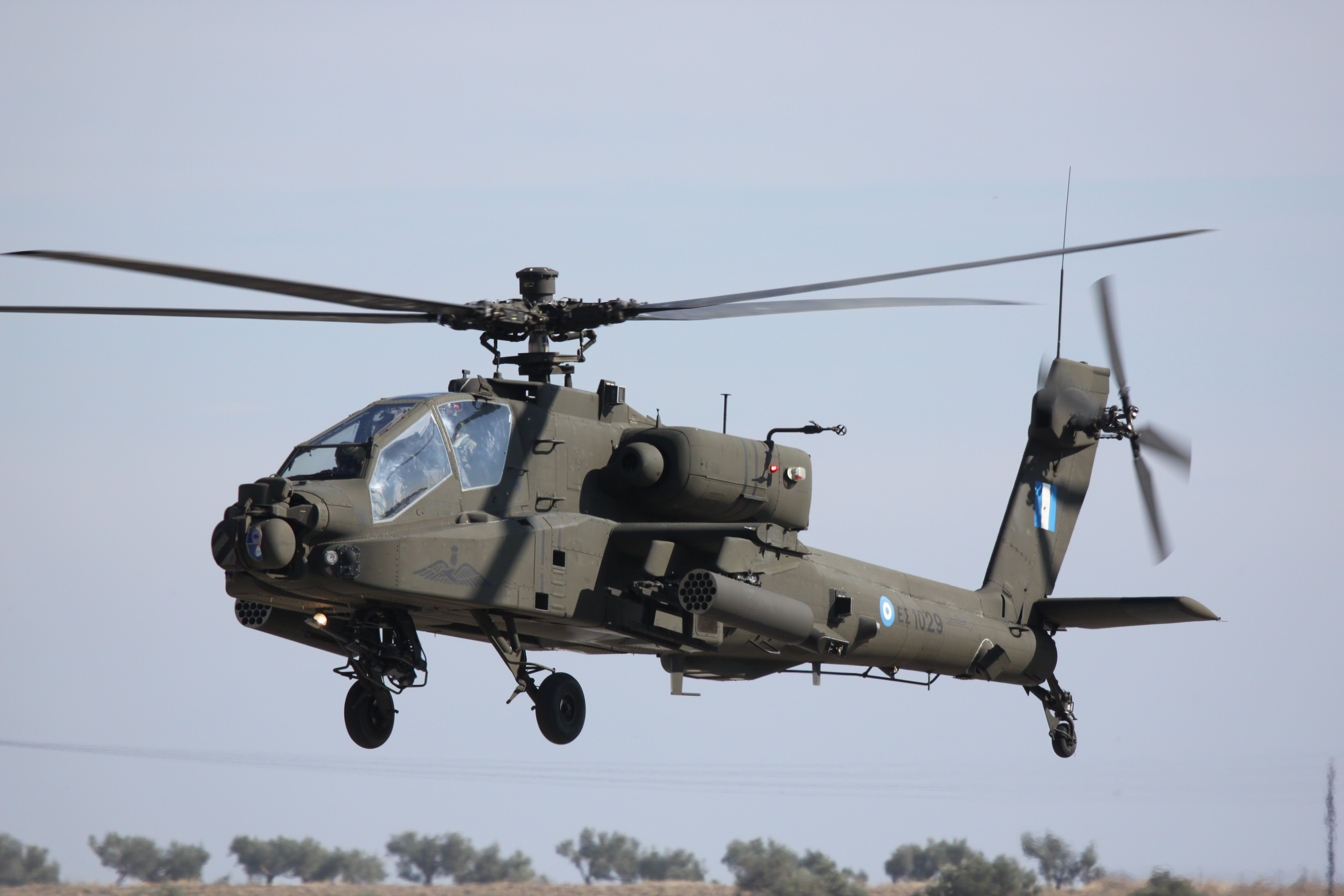
A Hellenic Army AH-64

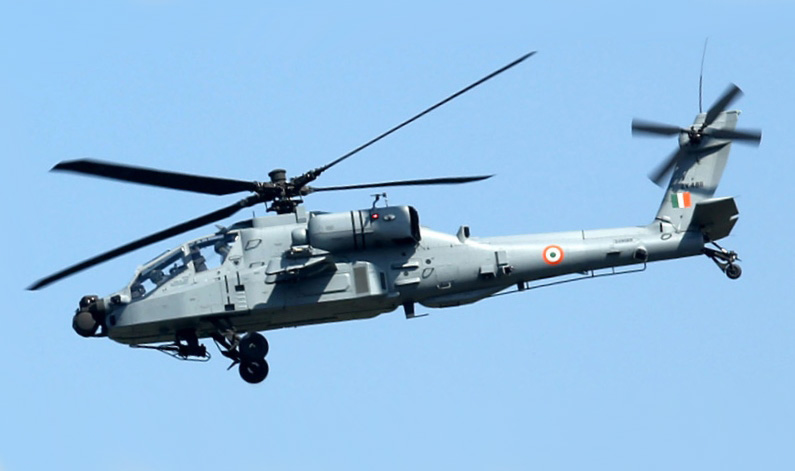
An AH-64E Apache of the Indian Air Force

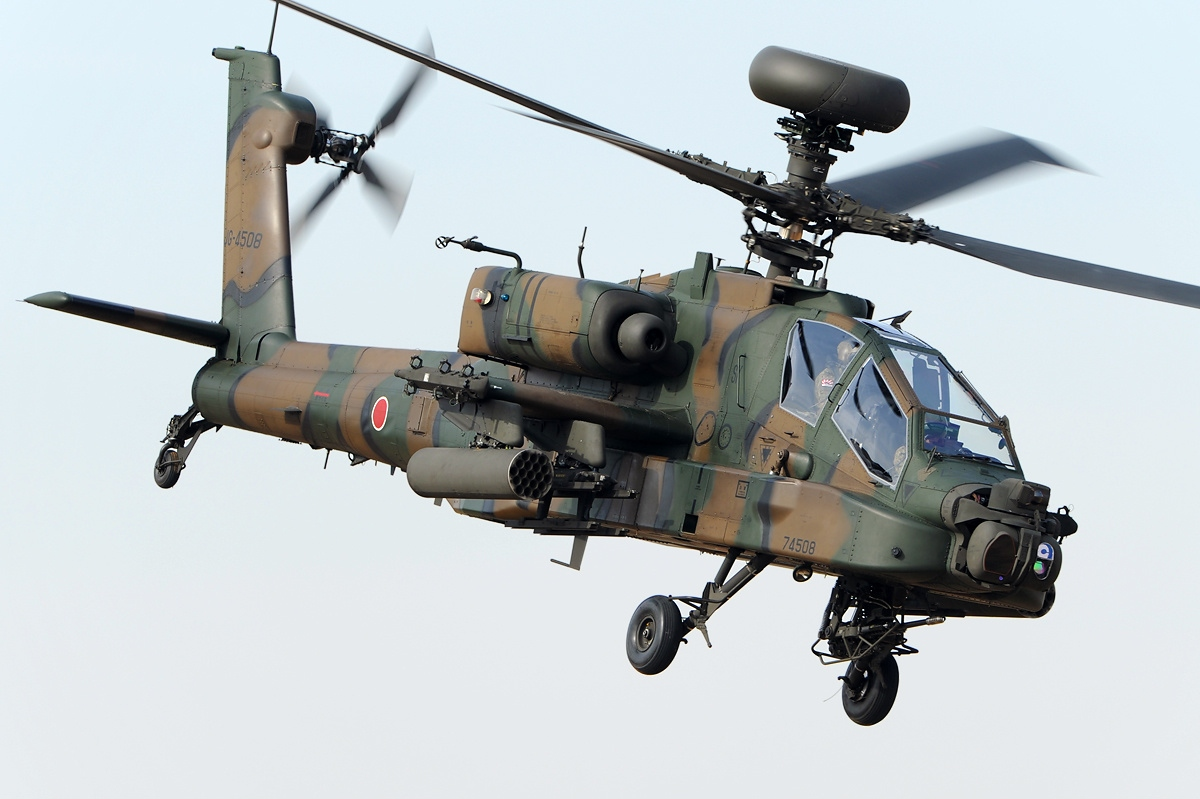
A Fuji Heavy Industries license built Apache for the Japanese GSDF

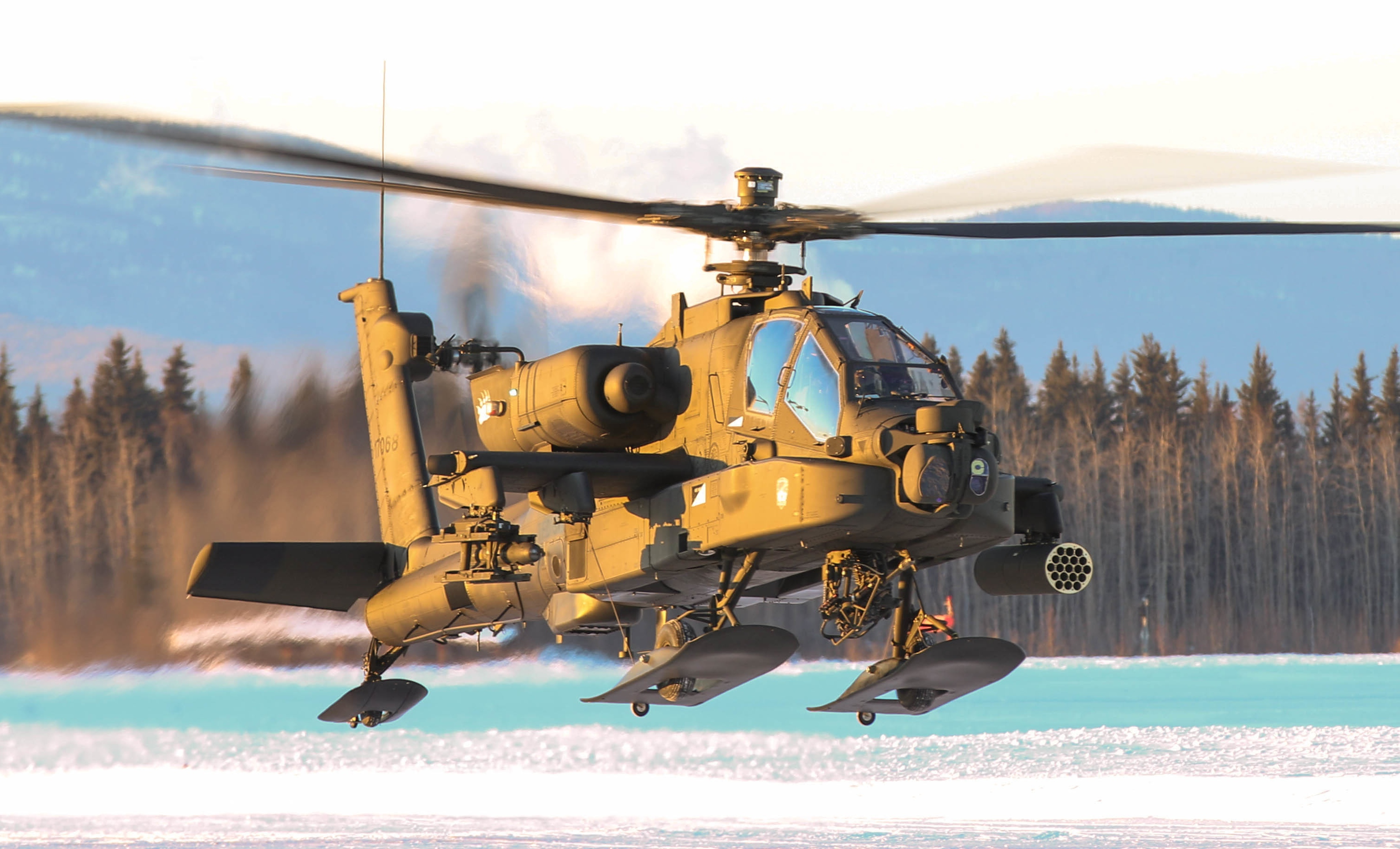
A U.S. Army ski equipped AH-64 training Fort Wainwright, Alaska

The AH-64 has had some modest success on the export market. It has been popular in the Middle East, where its role in the Gulf War established a bit of reputation. Its main user continues to be the U.S. Army, and the largest user in Europe will be Poland.

Australia

- Australian Army – 6 AH-64Es delivered of 29 on order. In September 2025, the first two were delivered.

Egypt

- Egyptian Air Force – 46 AH-64Ds

Greece

- Hellenic Army – 28 AH-64A/Ds

India

- Indian Air Force – 22 AH-64Es in inventory as of July 2020
- Indian Army – 6 AH-64E in inventory as of December 2025

Indonesia

- Indonesian Army – 8 AH-64Es

Israel

- Israeli Air Force – 48 AH-64A/Ds, 30 AH-64Es on order

Japan

- Japan Ground Self-Defense Force – 12 AH-64Ds

Kuwait

- Kuwait Air Force – 24 AH-64Ds

Morocco

- Royal Moroccan Air Force – 36 AH-64Es on order, with 12 delivered as of April 2026

Netherlands

- Royal Netherlands Air and Space Force – 28 AH-64Es

Poland

- Polish Land Forces – 96 AH-64Es on order, 8 AH-64Ds leased

Qatar

- Qatar Emiri Air Force – 24 AH-64Es

Saudi Arabia

- Royal Saudi Land Forces – 47 AH-64A/D/Es
- Saudi Arabia National Guard – 12 AH-64Es

Singapore

- Republic of Singapore Air Force – 19 AH-64Ds

South Korea

- Republic of Korea Army – 36 AH-64Es An additional 36 AH-64Es were approved in a $3.5 billion deal.

Taiwan (Republic of China)

- Republic of China Army – 29 AH-64Es

United Arab Emirates

- United Arab Emirates Air Force – 28 AH-64D/Es

United Kingdom

- British Army – 50 AH-64Es

United States

- United States Army – 750 total; estimated 160 AH-64Ds and 590 AH-64Es as of January 2025

== Specifications (AH-64A/D) ==
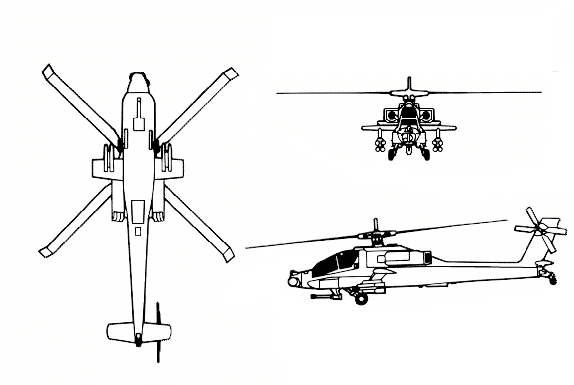

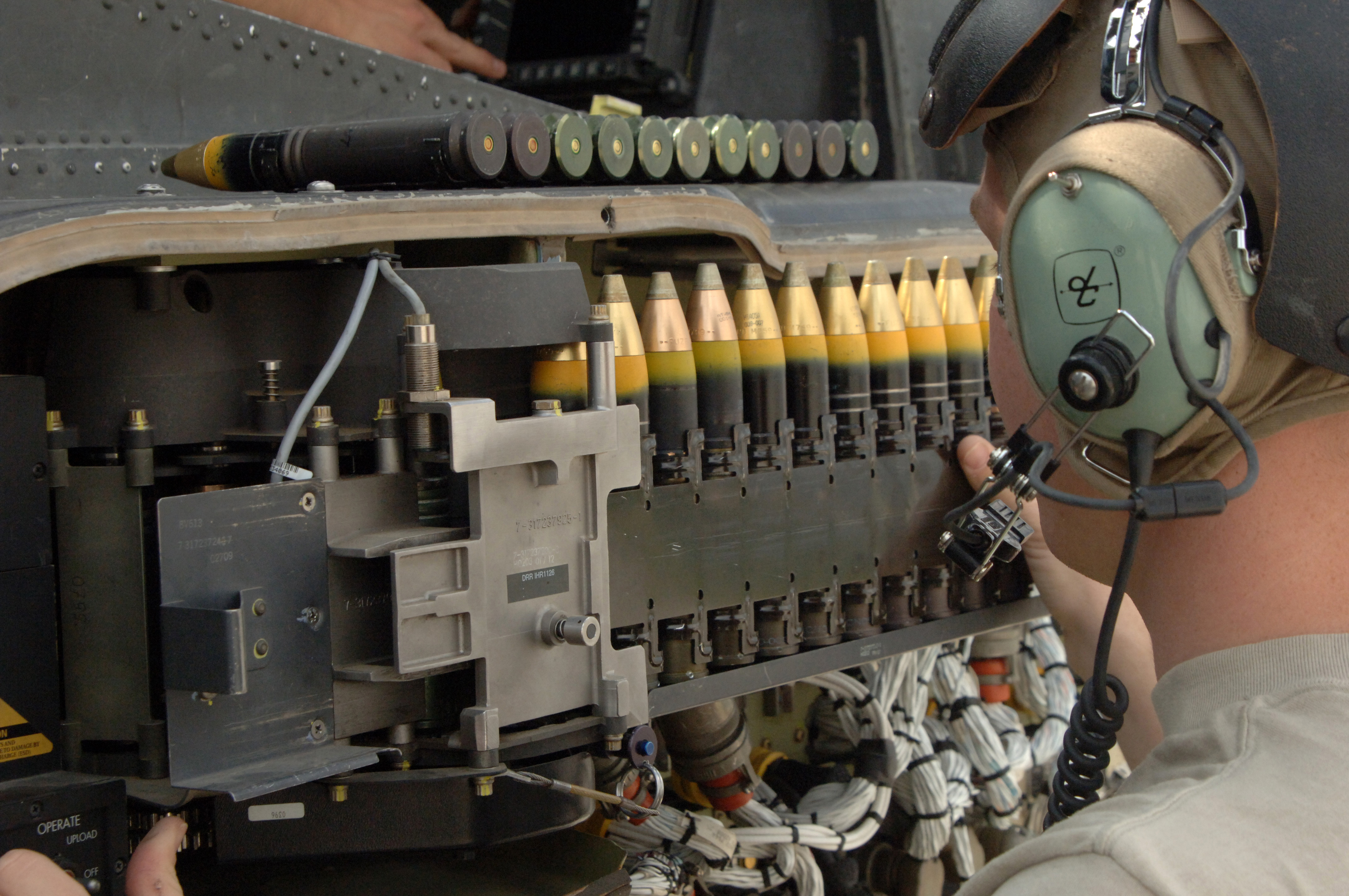
M789 HEDP 30 mm rounds being loaded into an AH-64D

Data from Jane's All the World's Aircraft 2000–2001, Jane's All the World's Aircraft 2010–2011, Apache AH-64 Boeing (McDonnell Douglas) 1976–2005

General characteristics

- Crew: 2 (pilot, and co-pilot/gunner)
- Length: 58 ft 2 in (17.73 m)
- Fuselage length: 49 ft 5 in (15.06 m)
- Height: 12 ft 8 in (3.87 m)
- Empty weight: 11,387 lb (5,165 kg)
- Gross weight: 17,650 lb (8,006 kg)
- Max takeoff weight: 23,000 lb (10,433 kg)
- Powerplant: 2 × General Electric T700-GE-701 turboshaft engines, 1,690 shp (1,260 kW) each (upgraded to 1,890 shp (1,409 kW) T700-GE-701C for AH-64A/D from 1990)
- Main rotor diameter: 48 ft 0 in (14.63 m)
- Main rotor area: 1,908.5 sq ft (177.31 m^{2}) 4-bladed main-rotor and 4-bladed tail-rotor with 55° non-orthogonal blade offset
- Blade section: root: HH-02; tip: NACA 64A006

Performance

- Maximum speed: 158 kn (182 mph, 293 km/h)
- Cruise speed: 143 kn (165 mph, 265 km/h)
- Never exceed speed: 197 kn (227 mph, 365 km/h)
- Range: 257 nmi (296 mi, 476 km) with Longbow radar mast
- Combat range: 260 nmi (300 mi, 480 km)
- Ferry range: 1,024 nmi (1,178 mi, 1,896 km)
- Service ceiling: 20,000 ft (6,100 m)
- Disk loading: 9.8 lb/sq ft (48 kg/m^{2})
- Power/mass: 0.18 hp/lb (0.30 kW/kg)

Armament

- Guns: 1× 30 mm x 113 mm (1.18 in x 4.48 in) M230 Chain Gun with 1,200 rounds as part of the Area Weapon Subsystem
- Hardpoints: Four pylon stations on the stub wings. Longbows also have a station on each wingtip for an AIM-92 Stinger twin missile pack.
- Rockets: Hydra 70 70 mm, CRV7 70 mm, and APKWS 70 mm air-to-ground rockets; APKWS-equipped rockets can also be used in an air-to-air role
- Missiles: Typically AGM-114 Hellfire variants; Air-to-Air Stinger (ATAS); AGM-65 Maverick and Spike missiles may also be carried.

Avionics

- Lockheed Martin/Northrop Grumman AN/APG-78 Longbow fire-control radar (Note: can only be mounted on the AH-64D/E)

== See also ==
- Aviation and Missile Research, Development, and Engineering Center
- United States Army Aviation and Missile Command – U.S. Army's provider of aviation and missile equipment

Related development

- AgustaWestland Apache – Attack helicopter series of the British Army
- Bell YAH-63 – Pre-production attack helicopter

Aircraft of comparable role, configuration, and era

- Agusta A129 Mangusta – Family of attack helicopters by Agusta, later AgustaWestland
- Bell AH-1 SuperCobra – Series of twin-engine attack helicopters
- Bell AH-1Z Viper – American attack helicopter
- CAIC Z-10 – Chinese attack helicopter
- Denel Rooivalk – Attack helicopter by Atlas Aircraft Corporation, later Denel Aviation
- Eurocopter Tiger – European attack helicopter
- HAL Prachand – Indian Light Combat Helicopter
- Harbin WZ-19 – Chinese reconnaissance and attack helicopter
- IAIO Toufan – Iranian attack helicopter
- Kamov Ka-50 – Attack helicopter
- Mil Mi-24 – Family of assault and attack helicopters
- Mil Mi-28 – Russian attack helicopter
- Panha 2091 – Iranian attack helicopter
- TAI/AgustaWestland T129 – Turkish attack and armed reconnaissance helicopter

Related lists

- List of active United States military aircraft
- List of aviation shootdowns and accidents during the Iraq War
- List of military electronics of the United States
- List of rotorcraft
