= List of equipment of the Philippine Air Force =

This is a list of equipment used by the Philippine Air Force (PAF), the branch of the Armed Forces of the Philippines that specializes in aerial warfare. It covers active equipment, such as aircraft, ordnances, air defenses, and retired aircraft inventory.

PAF has made use of its existing equipment to fulfill its mandate while modernization projects are underway. The Republic Act No. 7898 declares the policy of the State to modernize the military to a level where it can effectively and fully perform its constitutional mandate to uphold the sovereignty and preserve the patrimony of the republic. The law, as amended, has set conditions that should be satisfied when the defense department procures major equipment and weapon systems for the air force.

== Aircraft ==
Aircraft	Origin	Type	Variant	In service	Notes
Combat Aircraft
T-50 Golden Eagle	Republic of Korea	light multirole / LIFT	FA-50PH	11	12 on order
Embraer EMB 314	Brazil	light attack	A-29B	6	6 on order
Reconnaissance
Cessna 208	United States	ISR	208B EX	4	
Maritime Patrol
ATR 72	France / Italy	maritime patrol	ATR 72MP	2	
Transport
GAF Nomad	Australia	transport	N22B	3	
PTDI NC-212	Indonesia	transport	NC-212i	2	6 on order
CASA C-295	Spain	transport / VIP transport	C-295M/W	8	
C-130 Hercules	United States	tactical airlift	C-130B/H/T	5	3 C-130H planned to be transferred
C-130J Super Hercules	United States	tactical airlift	C-130J-30		3 on order
Twin Commander	United States	transport	690A	2	
Gulfstream G280	United States	AC2 / VIP transport		1	
Hawker 800	United States	VIP transport	800XP	1	
Helicopters
Bell 205	United States	utility / SAR	205A	8	2 are Huey II standard
Bell 412	United States	utility / VIP transport	412EP/EPX/HP	18	4 412EPX on order
PZL W-3	Poland	utility / SAR	W-3A	5	
Sikorsky UH-60	United States / Poland	utility / SAR	S-70i/A-5	48	1 S-70A-5 for SAR
Sikorsky S-76	United States	air ambulance	S-76A	9	
MD 500 Defender	United States	light attack	MD 520MG	24	
AgustaWestland AW109	Italy	armed scout / utility	AW109E	8	
TAI T129	Turkey	attack	T129B	6	
Trainer Aircraft
Cessna T-41	United States	primary trainer	T-41B	16	
SIAI-Marchetti SF.260	Italy	basic trainer / light attack	SF-260F/MP/TP	14	3 crashed in 2026. Fleet suspended.
SIAI-Marchetti S.211	Italy	jet trainer / light attack	AS-211	3	
UAV
Boeing Insitu ScanEagle	United States	surveillance	ScanEagle II	10	
Hermes 450	Israel	surveillance		4	
Hermes 900	Israel	surveillance		8	

== Air defense equipment ==
Model	Origin	Type	Notes
Surface-to-Air Missile System
SPYDER	Israel	Surface-to-air missile system	Two batteries were inducted into service in November 2022. One more battery was delivered in November 2024. Each battery has 3 Missile Firing Units. Mounted on board Tatra T815-7 truck chassis.
Anti-aircraft guns
M39 cannon	United States	Revolver cannon	Towed anti-aircraft gun taken from the PAF's retired Northrop F-5 fighters. Some units were transferred to the Philippine Army.
Ground-based Radar
IAI Elta ELM-2288ER AD-STAR	Israel	Air surveillance radar	3 fixed radar systems were delivered under the Air Surveillance Radar Phase 1 Project. Installed at Paredes Air Station, Gozar Air Station, and Mount Salakot Air Station. The ELM-2288ER AD-STAR radar system has an instrumented range of 480 kilometers.
IAI Elta ELM-2106NG ATAR	Israel	Air surveillance radar	1 mobile radar system delivered free under the Air Surveillance Radar Phase 1 Project.
Mitsubishi Electric J/FPS-3ME	Japan	Air surveillance radar	3 fixed radar systems to be delivered under the Air Surveillance Radar Phase 2 Project. The first unit was fully delivered in October 2023. The first unit was turned over to the PAF on 20 December 2023, replacing the General Electric AN/FPS-6 installed at the Wallace Air Station.The J/FPS-3ME has an instrumented range of 611 kilometres.
Mitsubishi Electric J/TPS-P14ME	Japan	Air surveillance radar	1 mobile radar system delivered under the Air Surveillance Radar Phase 2 Project. Mounted on board a Mitsubishi Fuso Canter chassis.

== Armored vehicles ==
Model	Origin	Type	Variant	In service	Notes
Armored personnel carriers
Cadillac Gage Commando 4×4	United States	Armoured personnel carrier	V-150	unknown	Used for base defense.
Kia KLTV	Republic of Korea	Armored Tactical Vehicle	K152	9	Delivered in August 2026
Kovico KMPV	Republic of Korea	Armored Tactical Vehicle	KMPV	(+2)	Philippine Air Force released a Notice of Award for 2 vehicles in December 2025.

== Ordnance ==
Model	Origin	Type	Notes
Air-to-air missile
AIM-9L/I-1 Sidewinder	United States	Short-range infrared missile	Mounted on the FA-50PH
Air-to-Air Stinger	United States	Short-range infrared missile	Mounted on the T129B
Air-to-surface missile and precision-guided munition
AGM-65G2 Maverick	United States	Infrared air-to-ground missile	Mounted on the FA-50PH
Roketsan Cirit	Turkey	Air-to-surface, anti-armor missile	Mounted on the T129B
L-UMTAS	Turkey	Air-to-surface, anti-armor missile	Mounted on the T129B
Guided Advanced Tactical Rocket	Israel	Precision-guided munition	Test-buy for the AW109E and the A-29B.
Advanced Precision Kill Weapon System	United States	Precision-guided munition	Mounted on the A-29B.
Surface-to-air missile
I-Derby MR	Israel	Medium-range missile	Used by the SPYDER-MR air defense system. The I-Derby has the range of 80 km (50 mi)
Python-5	Israel	Medium-range missile	Used by the SPYDER-MR air defense system. The Python-5 has the range of 40 km
General-purpose bombs and rockets
Joint Direct Attack Munition	United States	Precision-guided munition	
Lizard 4	Israel	Precision-guided munition	Bought from Elbit Systems, currently used by the FA-50PH and the A-29B.
GBU-12 Paveway II	United States	Laser-guided bomb	A Mark 82 bomb fitted with a paveway guidance kit.
GBU-49 Enhanced Paveway II	United States	Dual-mode GPS and laser-guided bomb	A GBU-12 Paveway II with an added GPS guidance.
Folding-Fin Aerial Rocket	United States	Air-to-ground rocket	
Hydra 70	United States	Air-to-ground rocket	
Zuni	United States	Air-to-ground rocket	
Mark 80 series	United States	General-purpose bomb	

== Gallery ==
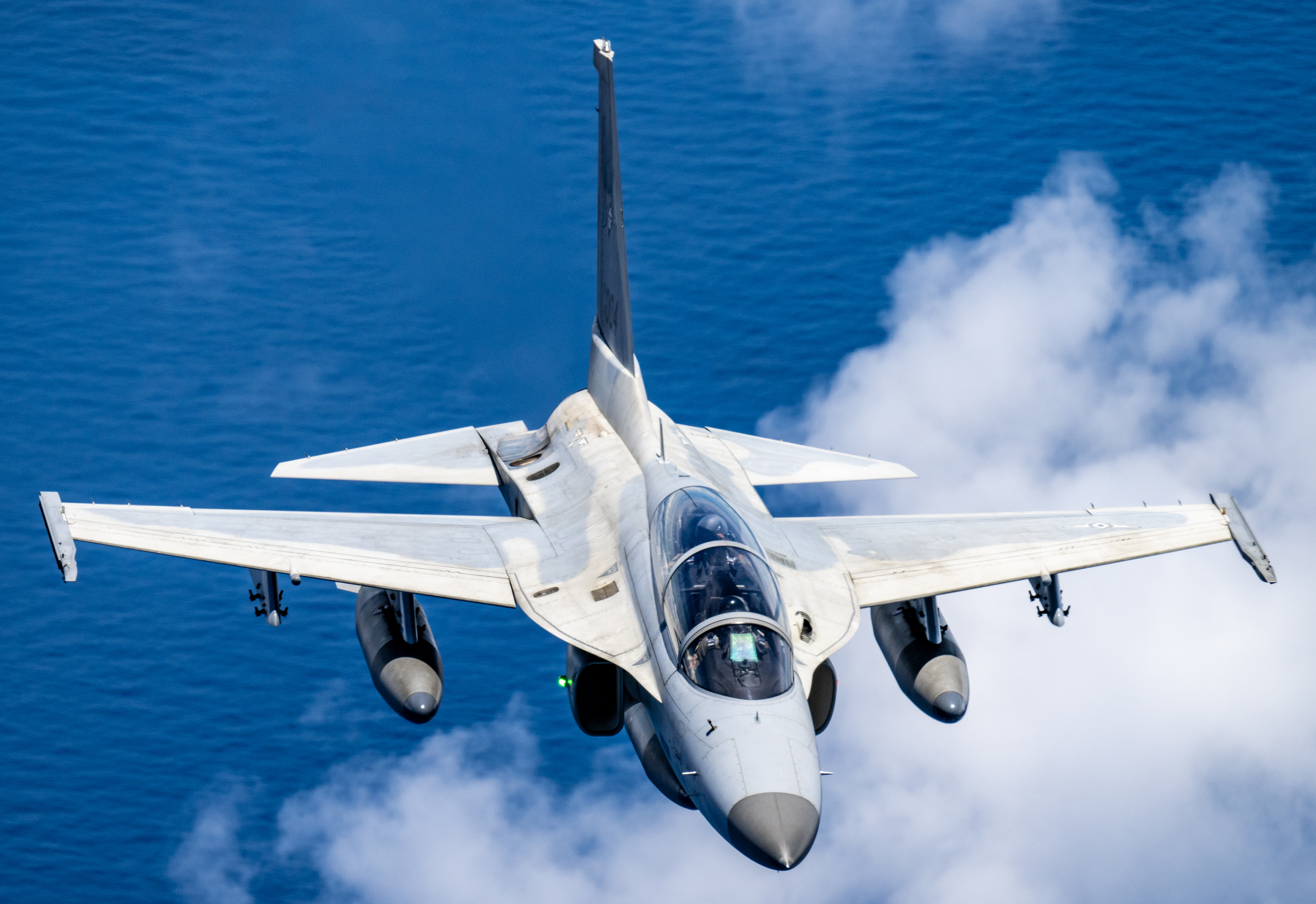
Philippine Air Force FA-50PH

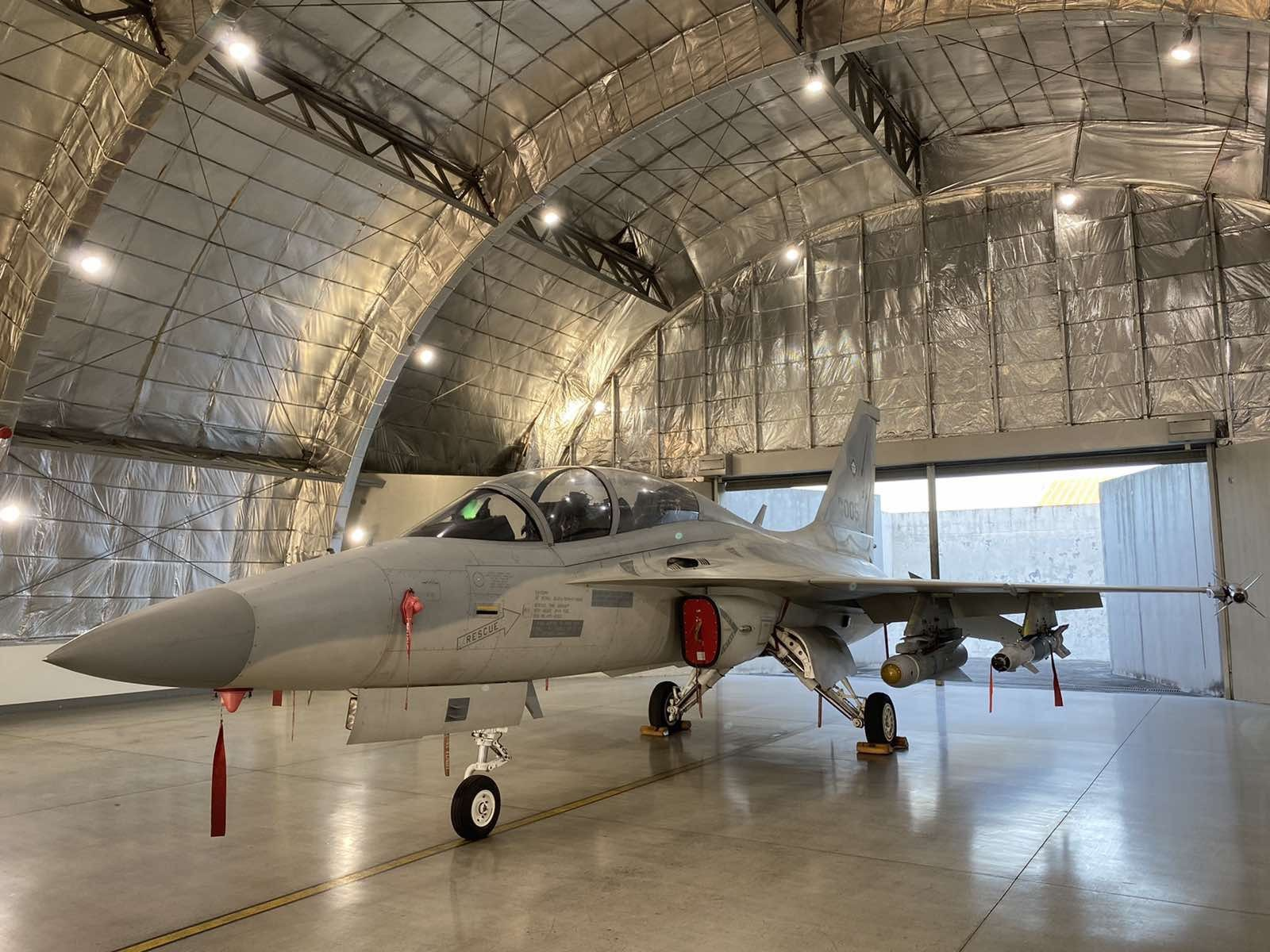
An FA-50PH equipped with GBU-12 Paveway II laser guided bombs, AGM-65G2 Maverick AGMs, and the AIM-9L/I-1 Sidewinder AAMs

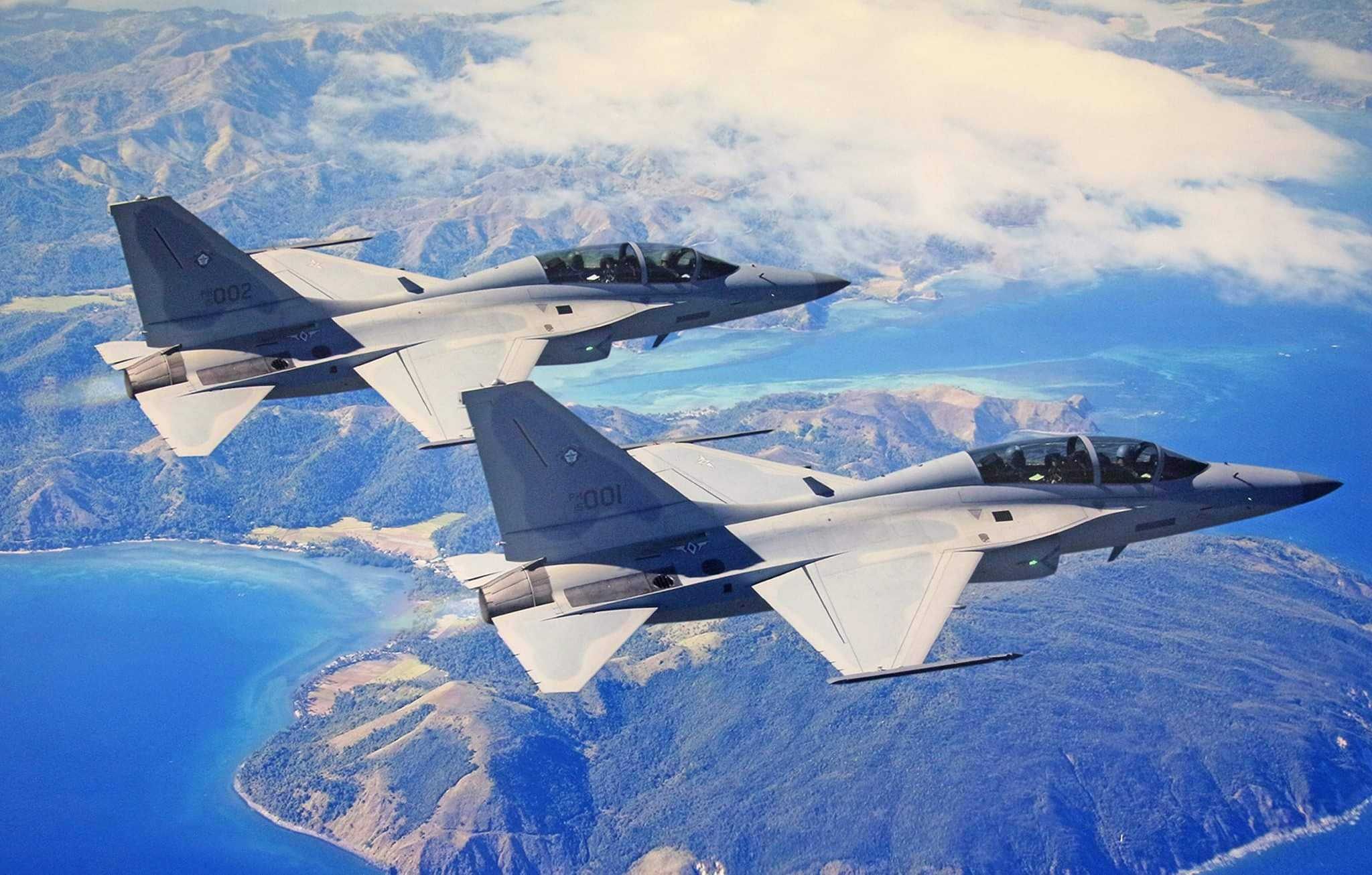
Two FA-50PH fighter jets

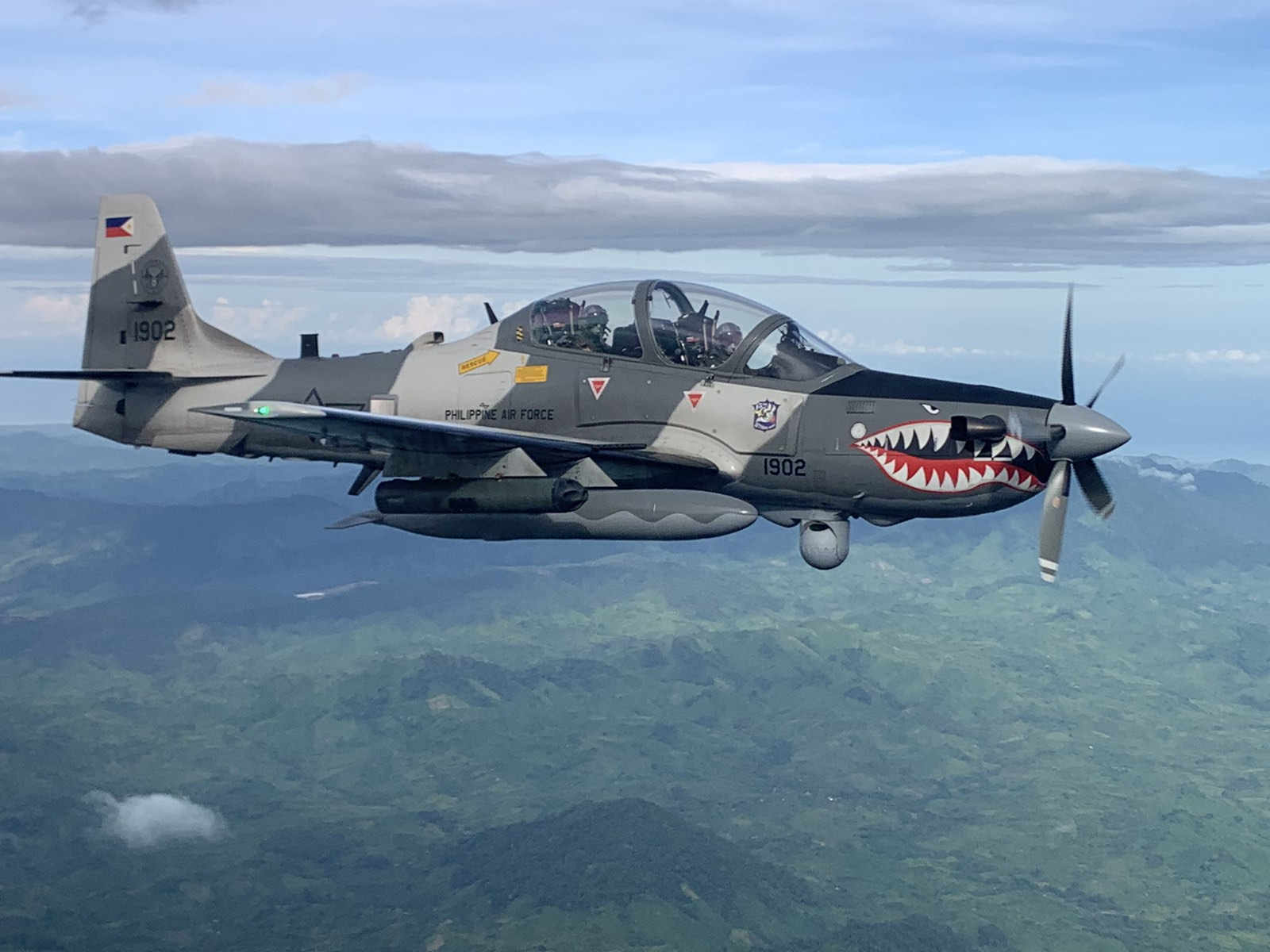
EMB 314 Super Tucano

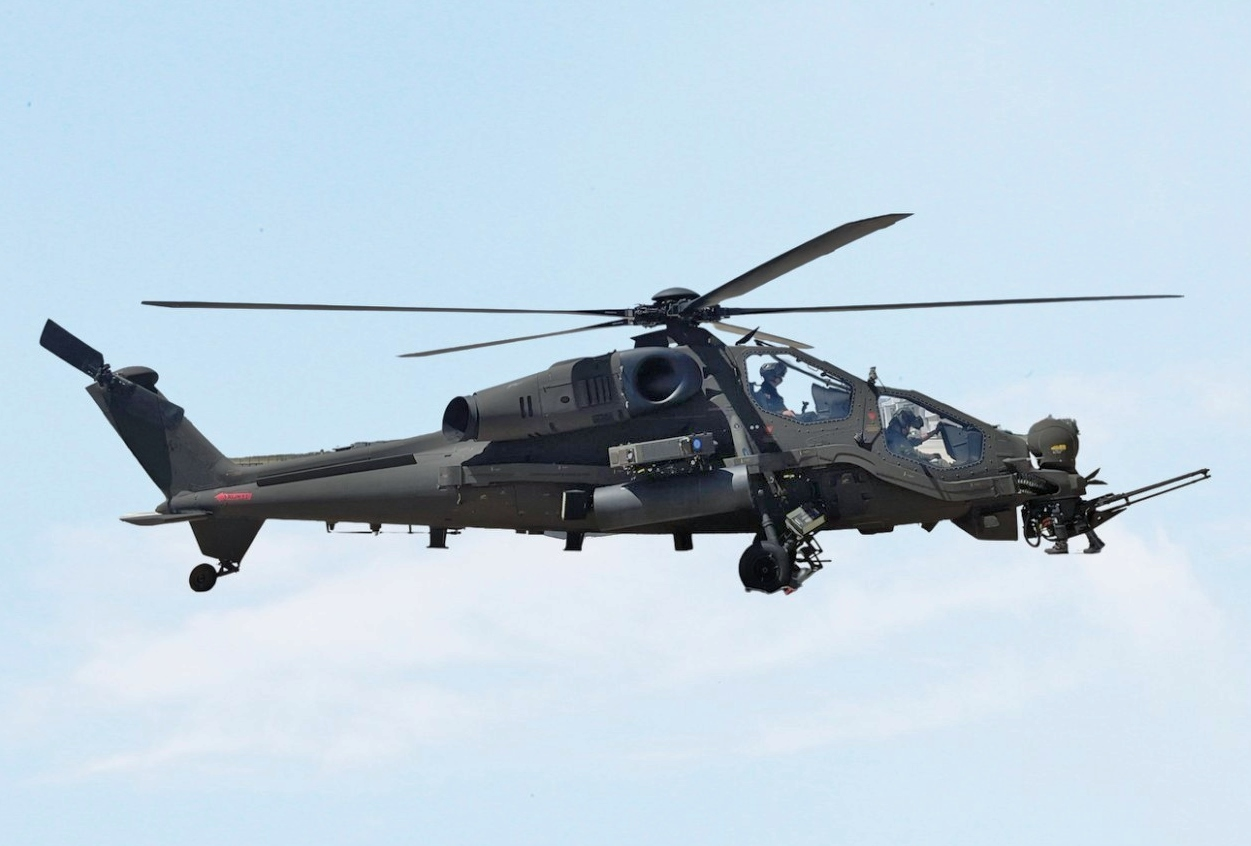
A T129B ATAK

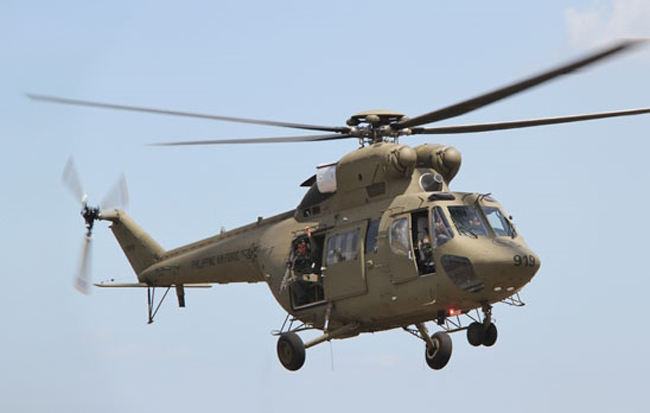
A PZL W-3 Sokół of the 505th Search and Rescue Group

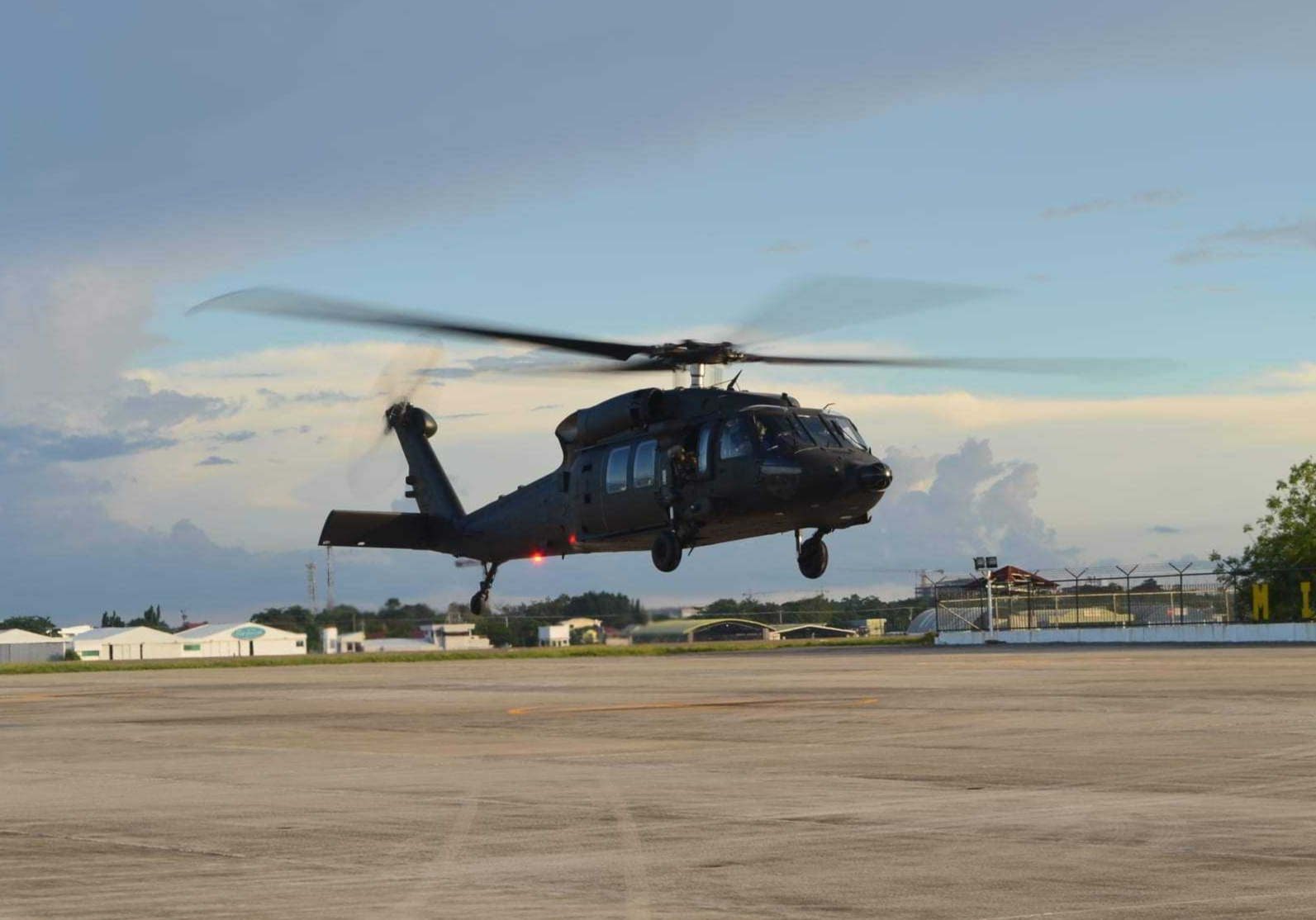
S-70i Black Hawk

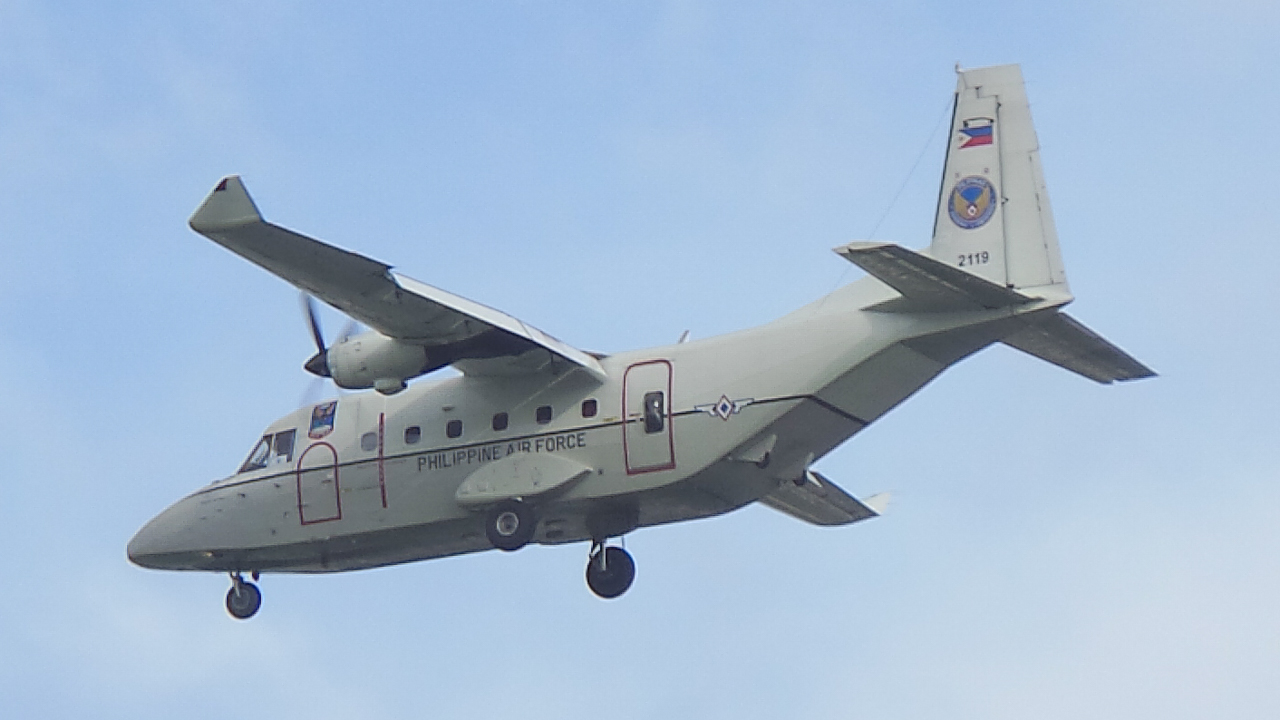
A CASA NC-212i light transport aircraft approaching Clark International Airport

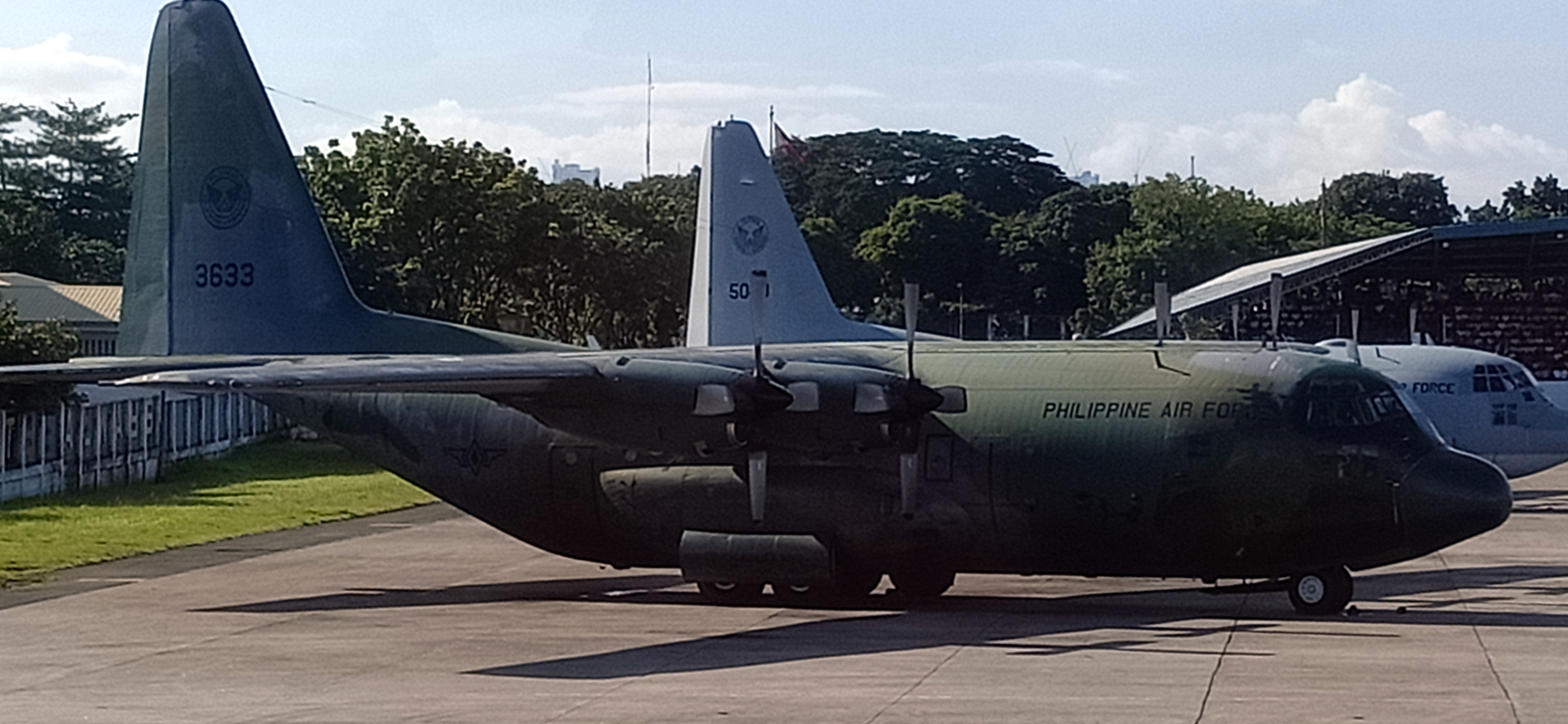
A pair of Lockheed C-130 Hercules at Villamor Air Base

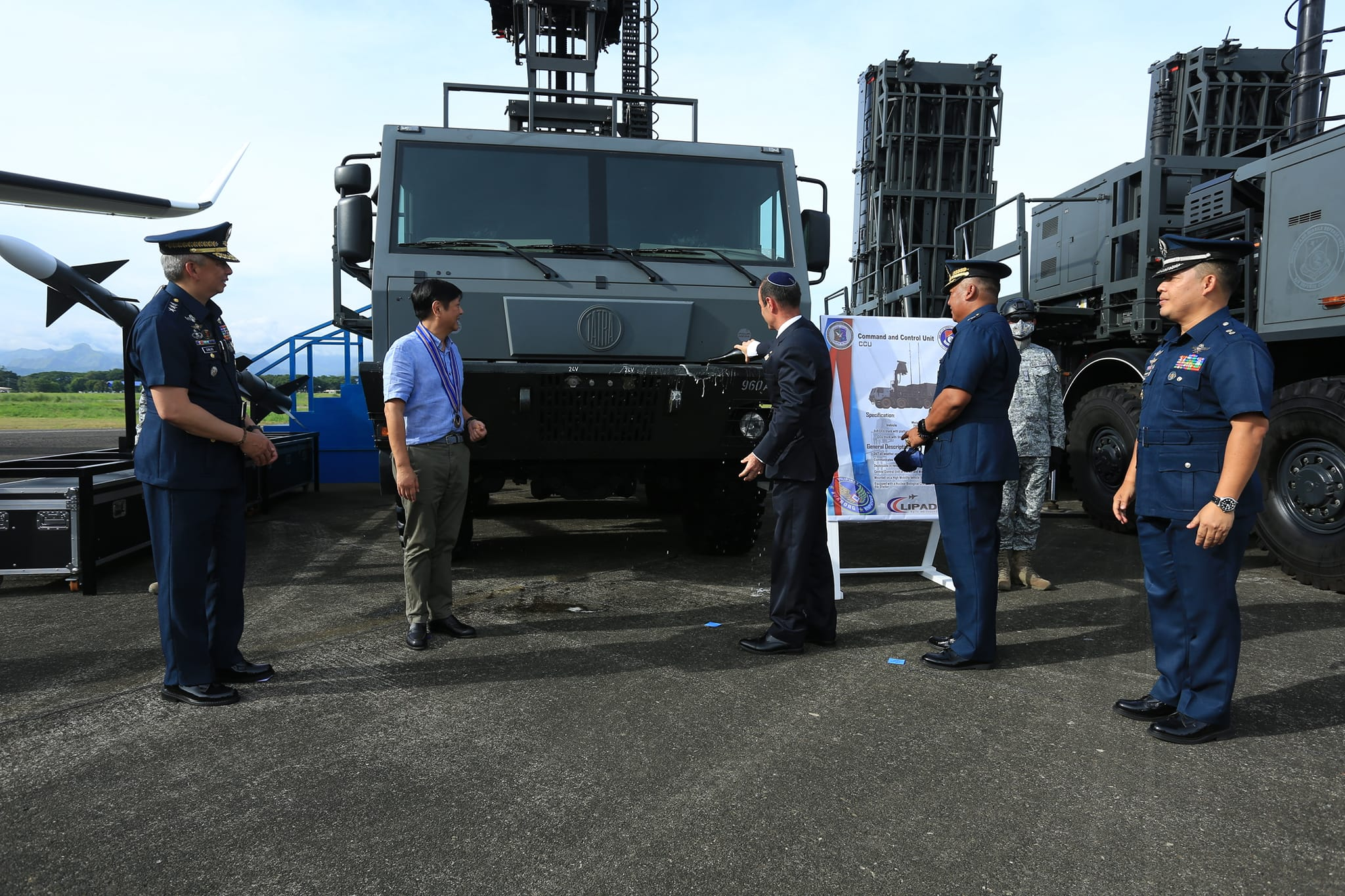
SPYDER medium range air defence system

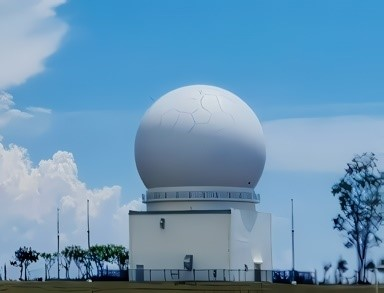
The Philippine Air Force unveiled its new Air Surveillance Radar System (ASRS) during an Acceptance, Turnover, and Blessing Ceremony at Wallace Air Station in San Fernando City, La Union

== Retired aircraft ==
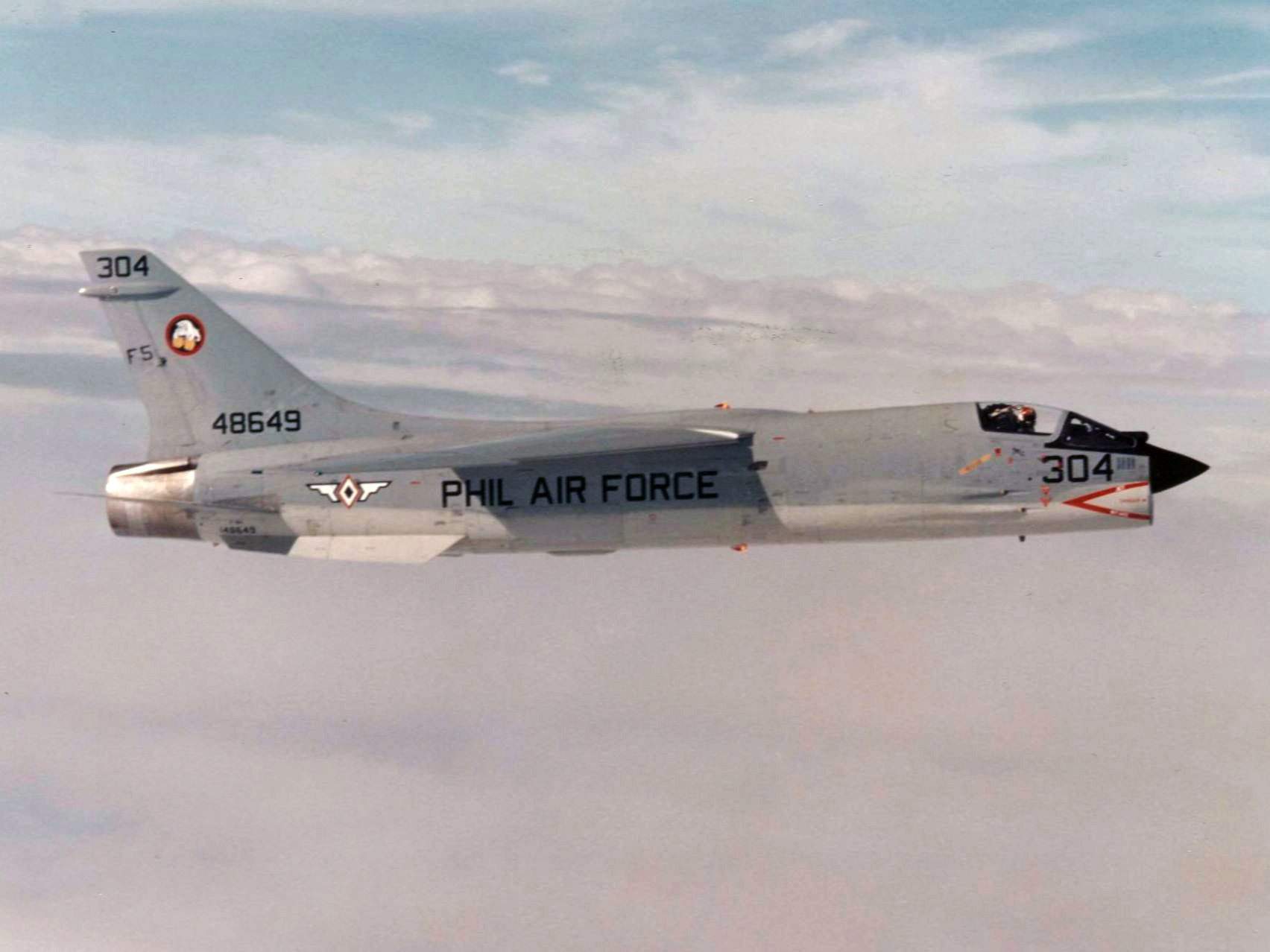
A Philippine F-8H Crusader

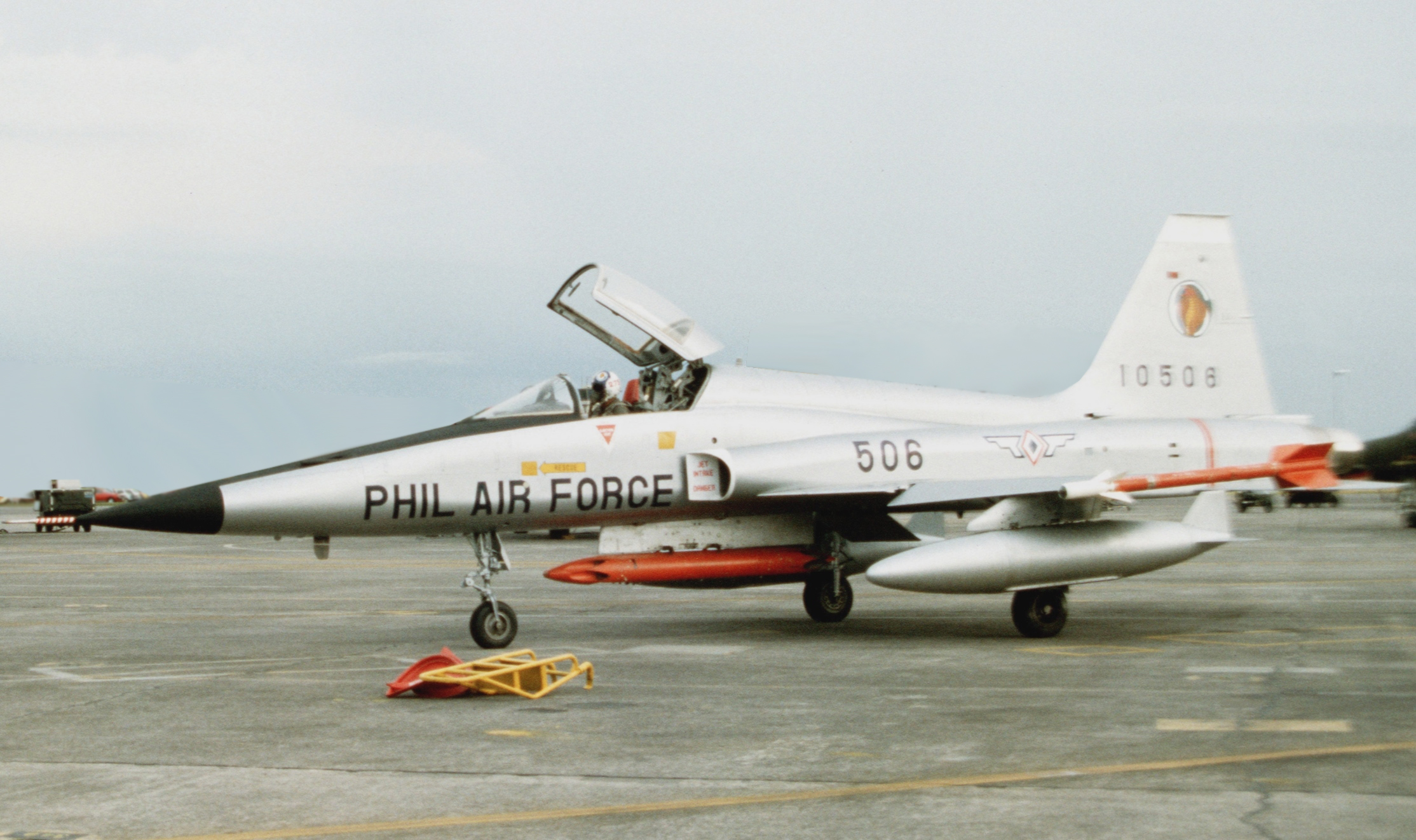
A F-5A at Clark Air Base

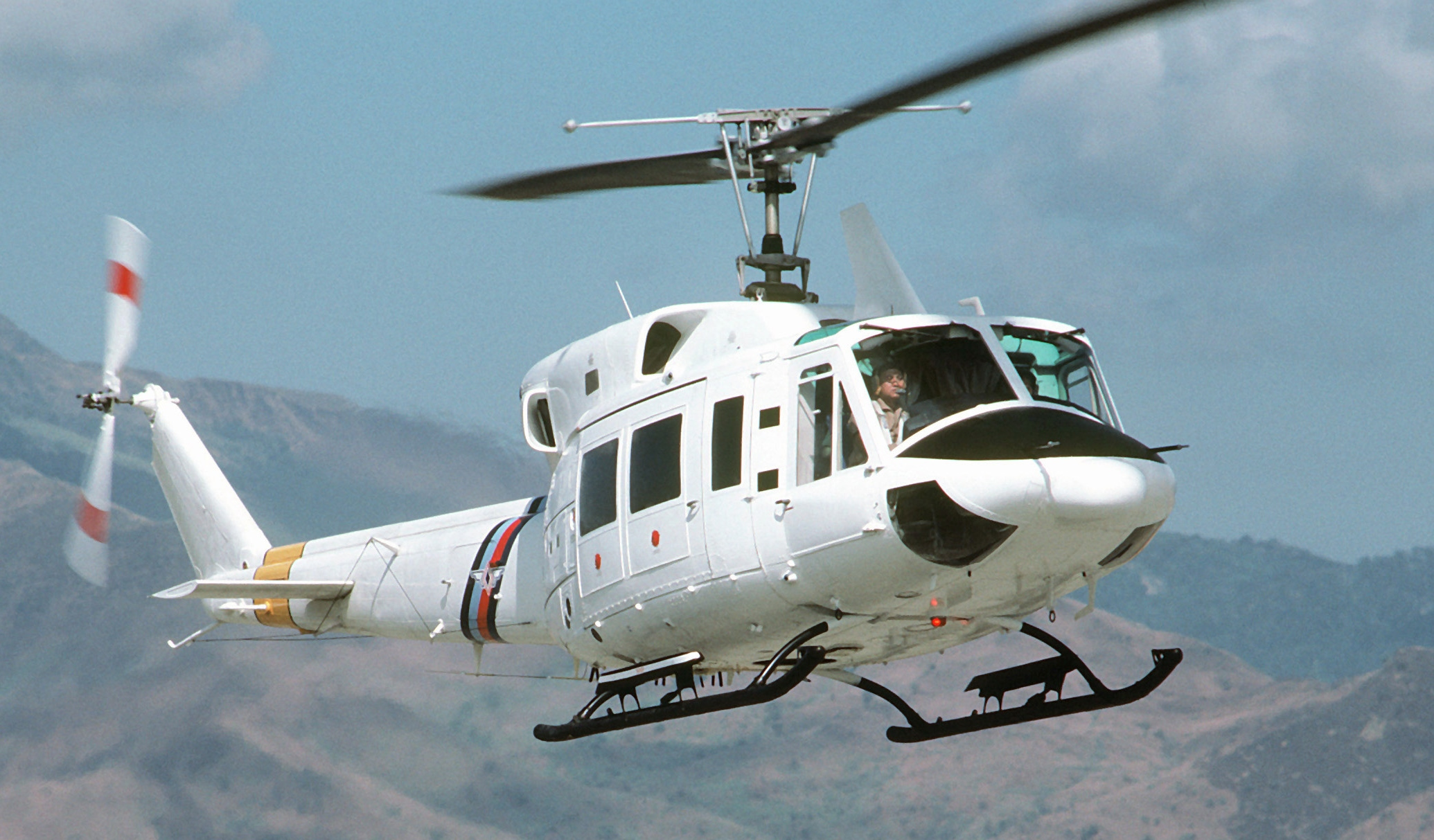
A UH-1N helicopter

Aircraft	Origin	Type	Variant	In service	Notes
Combat Aircraft
P-51 Mustang	United States	Fighter	P-51D	103	in service from 1947-1980s.
F-86 Sabre	United States	Fighter	F-86D / F-86F	20 / 50	in service 1957 - 1979 - replaced by the F-8 Crusader
Vought F-8 Crusader	United States	Fighter	F-8H	25	in service from 1977 to 1988.
Northrop F-5	United States	Fighter	F-5A/B	37	in service from 1965 to 2005
Douglas AC-47	United States	Ground attack / CAS		12	
North American Rockwell OV-10 Bronco	United States	Ground attack / CAS	OV-10A/C/M	41	
Transport
F27-200/500	Netherlands	VIP transport		1	
Douglas C-47	United States	Transport		30	
Britten-Norman Islander	United Kingdom	Transport		22	licensed, produced by PADC
C-123 Provider	United States	Transport	C-123K	19	in service from 1975 to 1980
de Havilland Canada DHC-2	Canada	Utility / Transport		25	replaced by the BN-2A Islander in 1980
Grumman HU-16 Albatross	United States	SAR / Utility		10	amphibious aircraft
Cessna 185	United States	Light utility		17	
Cessna 310	United States	Light utility		3	
Cessna O-1	United States	Observation		10	
Turbo Commander	United States	Utility	690A	2	
Helicopters
Bell UH-1	United States	utility	UH-1D/H	6	Acquired in 1969; approximately 20+ units in inventory, but exact figures remain undocumented.
Sikorsky H-19	United States	Utility / Transport		7	obtained in 1956
Bell 47	United States	Utility		1	
Bell 214	United States	Utility		2	
Bell 212	United States	VIP		1	replaced by the W-3 Sokół
Sikorsky H-34	United States	Utility		2	obtained in 1965
MBB Bo 105	Germany	Utility		38	transferred to the Navy
Sikorsky S-62	United States	VIP		2	
Aérospatiale SA330	France	Utility	SA330L	2	
Hughes TH-55	United States	Trainer		2	
Fairchild Hiller FH-1100	United States	Utility		8	
Bell AH-1 Cobra	United States	Attack	AH-1S	2	
Trainer Aircraft
Lockheed T-33	United States	Trainer / Reconnaissance	T-33A/RT-33A	25 / 2	in service from 1955 to 1994 - replaced by the SIAI-Marchetti S.211
North American T-6	United States	Trainer	T-6G	38	retired from service
North American T-28	United States	Trainer	T-28A/D	20 / 24	in service from 1970 until late 1992
Beechcraft T-34	Japan	Trainer	T-34B	36	licensed, built by Fuji Industries
