= TAI T929 ATAK 2 =

Turkish attack helicopter

T929 ATAK 2
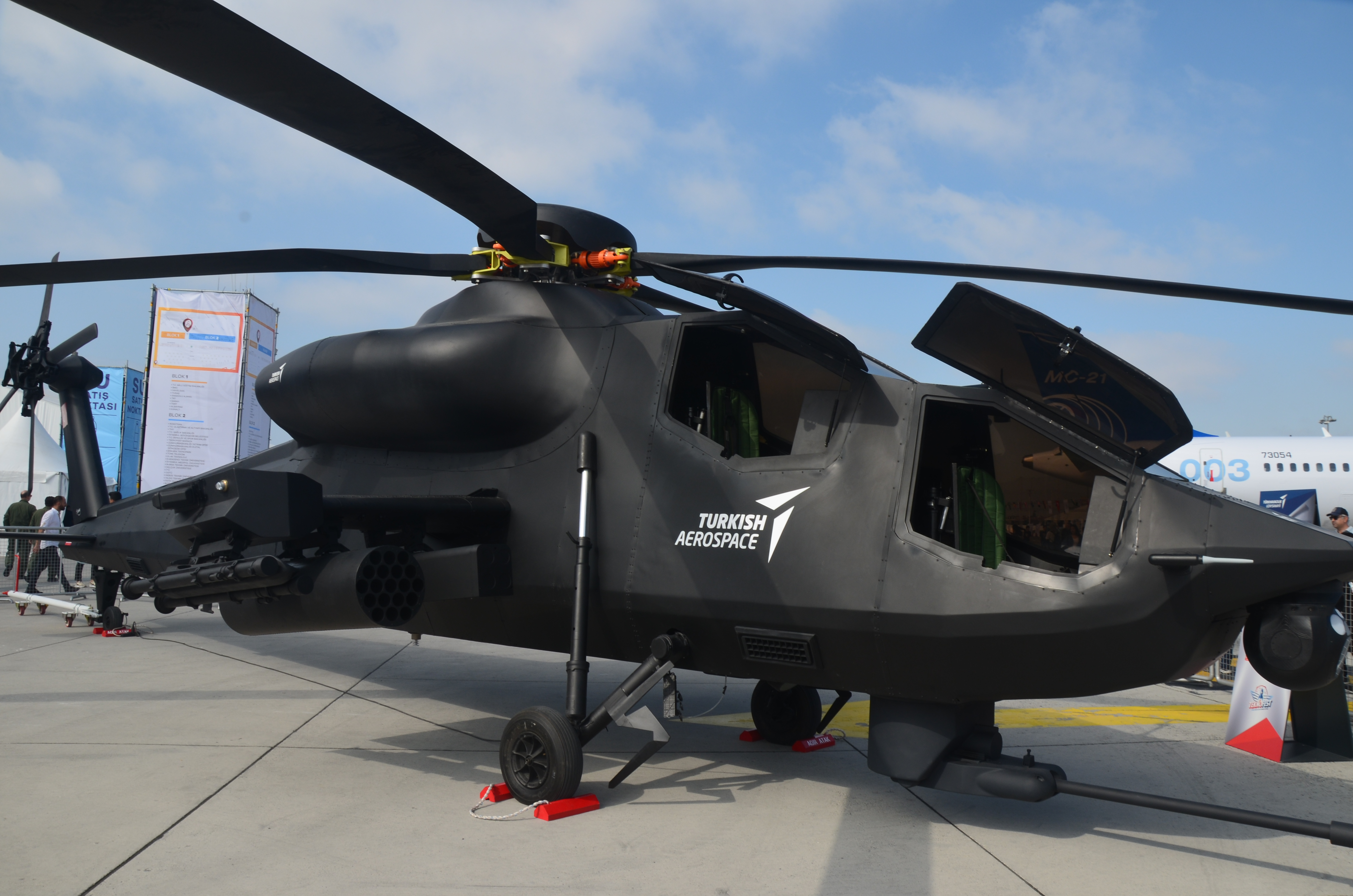
- Atak 2 model introduced at Teknofest 2019

General information
- Type: Heavy attack helicopter
- National origin: Turkey
- Manufacturer: Turkish Aerospace Industries
- Status: Under development
- Primary user: Turkish Army (intended)

History
- Introduction date: 2026 (planned)
- First flight: 28 April 2023
- Developed from: TAI/AgustaWestland T129 ATAK; TAI T625 Gökbey

The TAI T929 ATAK 2 is a twin-engine, heavy attack helicopter under development by Turkish Aerospace Industries. The helicopter is designed for attack, electronic warfare and reconnaissance missions in all-weather environments at both day and night.

The Atak 2 will incorporate some sub-systems and components developed under T129 and the T625 Gökbey helicopter projects.

== Development ==
In November 2018, the Turkish Undersecretariat for Defence Industries (SSB) initiated the heavy-class Atak 2 helicopter comparable to Boeing AH-64 Apache for Turkish military and potential export markets. In February 2020, the Turkish Undersecretariat for Defence Industries (SSB) signed a contract with Turkish Aerospace Industries to develop the helicopter for an undisclosed value.

The Turkish Aerospace Industries (TAI) is developing the T929 Atak 2 helicopter using industrial experience gained through the joint T129 Attack helicopter project between Turkish Aerospace Industries and the Italian Leonardo Company.

It is being developed to meet a need for a heavy attack helicopter for the Turkish Land Forces and a requirement from the Turkish Navy to operate from the TCG Anadolu amphibious assault ship (LHD).

== Design ==
The T929 helicopter features tandem seats, asymmetrical weapons bay, high ammunition capacity, low infrared (IR) signature, digital cockpit, ballistic protection, improved avionics, electronic warfare and countermeasure capability.

The helicopter will be fitted with a nose-mounted forward-looking infrared (FLIR) turret that includes target-tracking functionality. The helicopter will also feature electronic warfare systems such as infrared/ultraviolet missile-warning sensors and a tail-mounted directed-infrared countermeasure (DIRCM) system to jam heat-seeking missiles.

The heavy class helicopter can be tasked with air-to-ground combat, air-to-air combat, armed reconnaissance surveillance and close air support (CAS) operations.

=== Engines ===
The T929 Atak 2 will be powered by two 2,500 horsepower turboshaft engines. Turkish TAI has signed an agreement with Ukraine's Motor Sich to supply fourteen TV3-117 engines for its developmental ATAK 2 heavy attack helicopter.

== Specifications ==
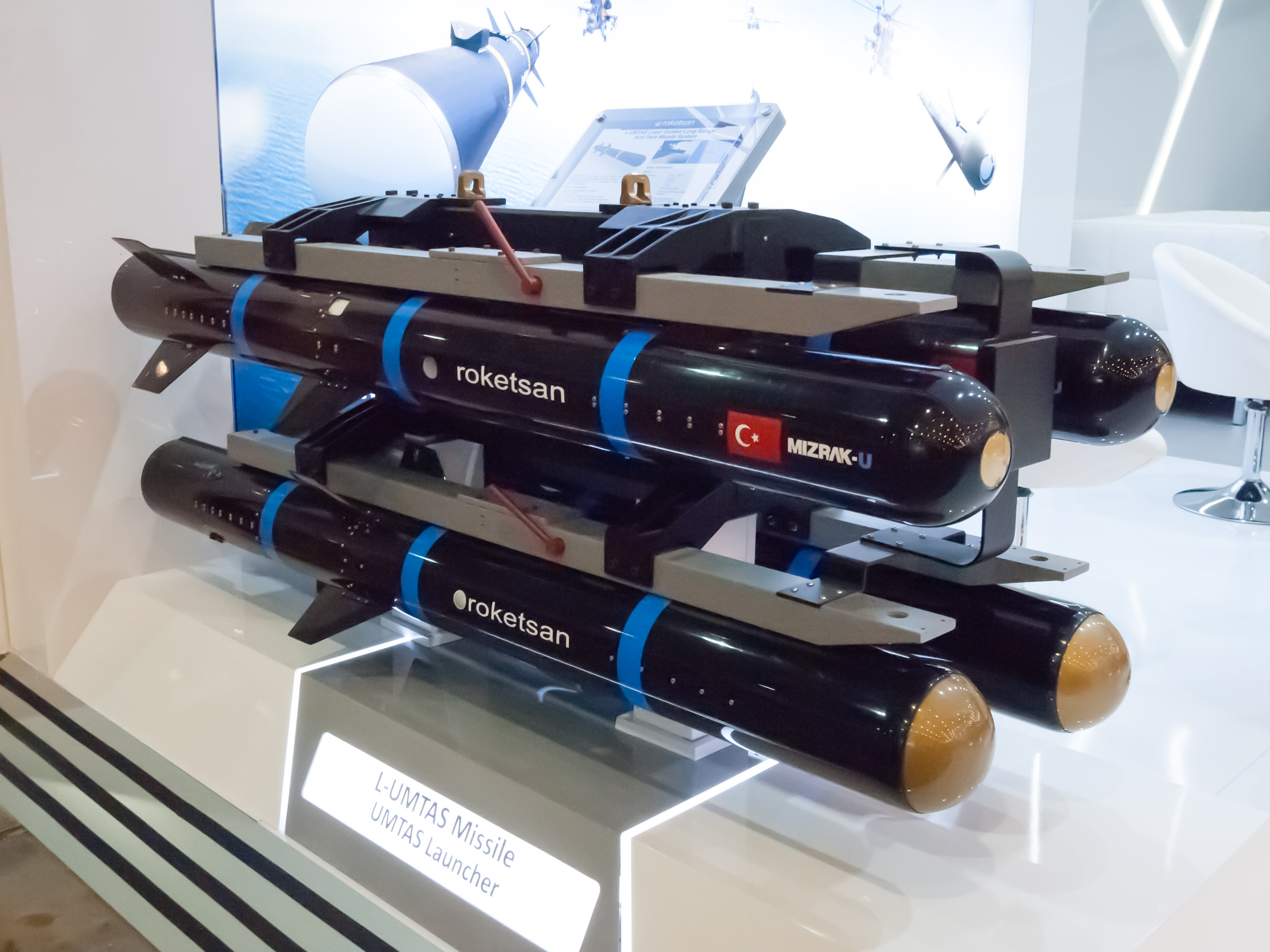
L-UMTAS (upper) and UMTAS (lower) missiles displayed on helicopter pylon

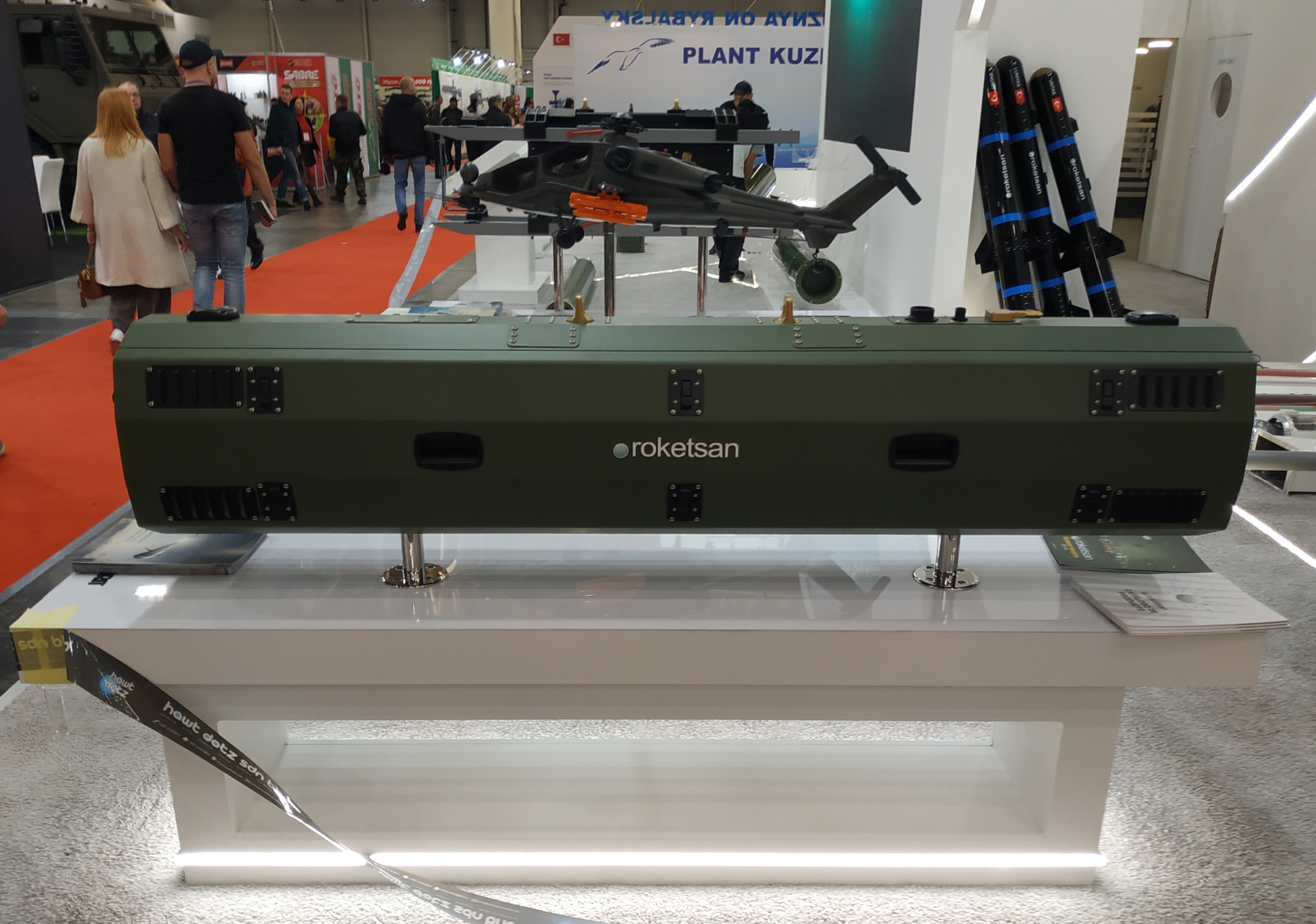
Cirit launcher with four missiles, Kyiv, 2019 01

Data from:
General characteristics

- Crew: 2
- Max takeoff weight: 10,000 kg (22,046 lb)
- Powerplant: 2 × TV3-117 turboshaft engines, 1,864.25 kW (2,500.00 hp) each

Performance

- Maximum speed: 318 km/h (198 mph, 172 kn)
- Cruise speed: 314 km/h (195 mph, 170 kn)
- Endurance: 40° / +50°C Temperature and Icing Condition
- Service ceiling: 6,096 m (20,000 ft)

Armament

- Guns: 1× 30x113 mm VENOM LR main gun
- Hardpoints: 6 with a capacity of up to 1,500 kg , with provisions to carry combinations of:
  - Rockets:
    - 70 mm (2.75 in) unguided rockets such as MKE FFAR, Hydra 70, CRV7
  - Missiles:
    - UMTAS: UMTAS and L-UMTAS anti-tank missiles
    - Cirit: 70 mm guided missile used against lightly armored / unarmored targets
    - PorSav or Air-to-Air Stinger (ATAS) or Air-to-Air Mistral (ATAM) or Bozdoğan or AIM-9 Sidewinder anti-aircraft missiles (at least one of these)

Avionics

    - 4-Axis Autopilot
    - Modular Avionics Architecture
    - Target Detection Radar
    - Target Detection System
    - Helmet-Integrated Imaging System

== See also ==
- TAI/AgustaWestland T129 ATAK
- Leonardo Helicopters AW249
- TAI T625 Gökbey
- TAI T629
