= TAI T625 Gökbey =

Turkish twin-engined light transport/utility helicopter

T625 Gökbey
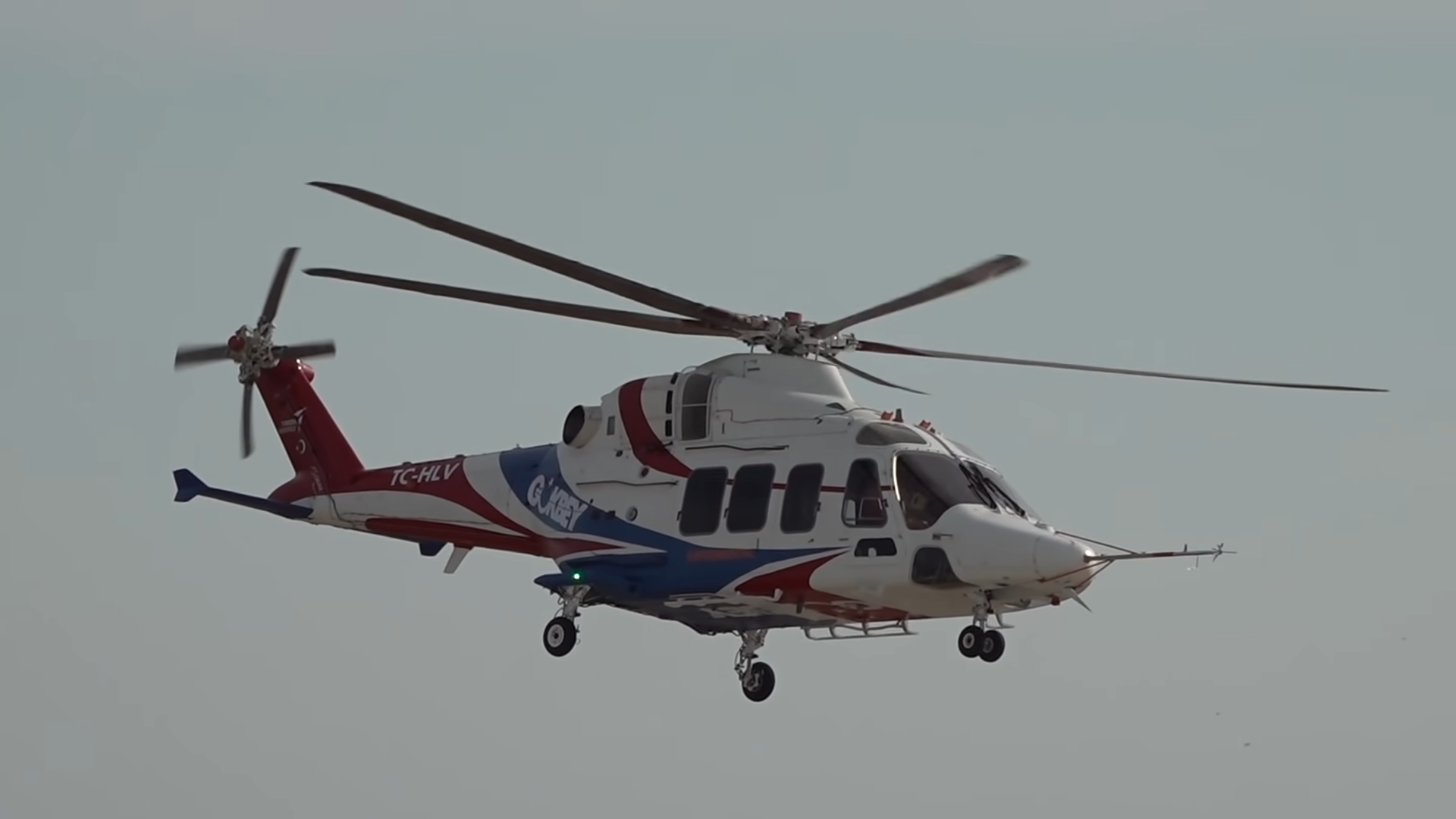
- T625 flying at 2021 Teknofest

General information
- Type: Utility helicopter
- National origin: Turkey
- Manufacturer: Turkish Aerospace Industries
- Designer: Aselsan; Turkish Aerospace Industries
- Status: In service
- Primary users: Turkish Armed Forces Gendarmerie General Command
- Number built: 4 prototypes built for tests + 7 Delivered to Turkish Armed Forces

History
- Introduction date: 29 October 2024
- First flight: 6 September 2018

The TAI T625 Gökbey is a twin-engined light transport/utility helicopter developed by Turkish Aerospace Industries. Turkey's Undersecretariat for Defence Industries plans to offer the new platform to the Turkish Armed Forces and cooperating nations.

== Design and development ==
Turkish Aerospace Industries launched preliminary design studies in 2010. The project commenced in 2013 when Undersecretariat for Defence Industries signed a contract with the Turkish Aerospace Industries to develop a 6-ton class multi-role helicopter for land operations. Alp Aviation is responsible for production and assembly of landing gear, gearbox and dynamic components, while Spanish CESA was selected to supply hydraulic systems.

The T625 is expected to weigh 5 tonnes and is in the interim powered by two LHTEC CTS800 engines. The CTS800 was chosen due to commonality with the TAI/AgustaWestland T129. TUSAS Engine Industries has developed a next-generation indigenous powerplant for the T625 named the TEI TS1400. The first delivery of TEI TS1400 happened on December 5, 2020.

The T625 features a four-axis dual redundant automatic flight control system, along with an ASELSAN glass cockpit with two wide touchscreen Integrated Mission Displays (8x20 inches) and two touchscreen data entry Touch Command Control Units (8x10 inches). It is designed for IFR and VFR single pilot operations, night operations and flight in known icy conditions. The Turkish Presidency of Defense Industries has confirmed that it has obtained a multitude of patents for various sub-systems used in the T625.

On 6 September 2018, the prototype, registered TC-HLP, conducted its maiden flight at Ankara. The first Gokbey helicopter was delivered to the Turkish Armed Forces on 29 October 2024. The third helicopter was delivered on 14 January 2025.

On 10 June 2026, HAVELSAN announced the completion of the Göksim full-flight simulator, which it developed for Gökbey, with the system entering the delivery phase.

== Operators ==
=== Military/Police operators ===
Turkey - More than 100 helicopters planned. 20+6 first batch ordered.

- Turkish Land Forces - 1 in service, 15 on order
- Turkish Air Force - 4 on order
- Gendarmerie General Command - 5 in service.22
- Coast Guard Command - 3 on order
- General Directorate of Security - 1 in service, 2 on order
- Ministry of Health - 3 on order.

=== Future operators ===
Turkey

- Turkish Naval Forces - 57 planned.

== Specifications ==
Data from

General characteristics

- Crew: 2
- Capacity: 12 passengers(Included Crew)
- Length: 15.87 m (52 ft 1 in)
- Max takeoff weight: 6,050 kg (13,338 lb)
- Powerplant: 2 × LHTEC CTS800-4A, (TEI TS1400 - undergoing testing / scheduled for 2027) turboshaft engine, 1,024 kW (1,373 hp) each
- Main rotor diameter: 13.2 m (43 ft 4 in)

Performance

- Maximum speed: 306 km/h (190 mph, 165 kn)
- Cruise speed: 278 km/h (173 mph, 150 kn)
- Range: 740 km (460 mi, 400 nmi) +
- Endurance: 3 hours 48 minutes
- Service ceiling: 6,096 m (20,000 ft)

== See also ==
Related development

- TAI T629
- TAI T925

Aircraft of comparable role, configuration, and era

- AgustaWestland AW139
- Airbus Helicopters H160
- Eurocopter EC155
- Harbin Z-9
- Kamov Ka-60
- Sikorsky S-76
- HAL Dhruv
- HAL Light Utility Helicopter
- HAL Rudra
- KAI LCH
- KAI LAH

Related lists

- List of helicopters
- List of utility helicopters
