= TEI TS1400 =

Turboshaft engine

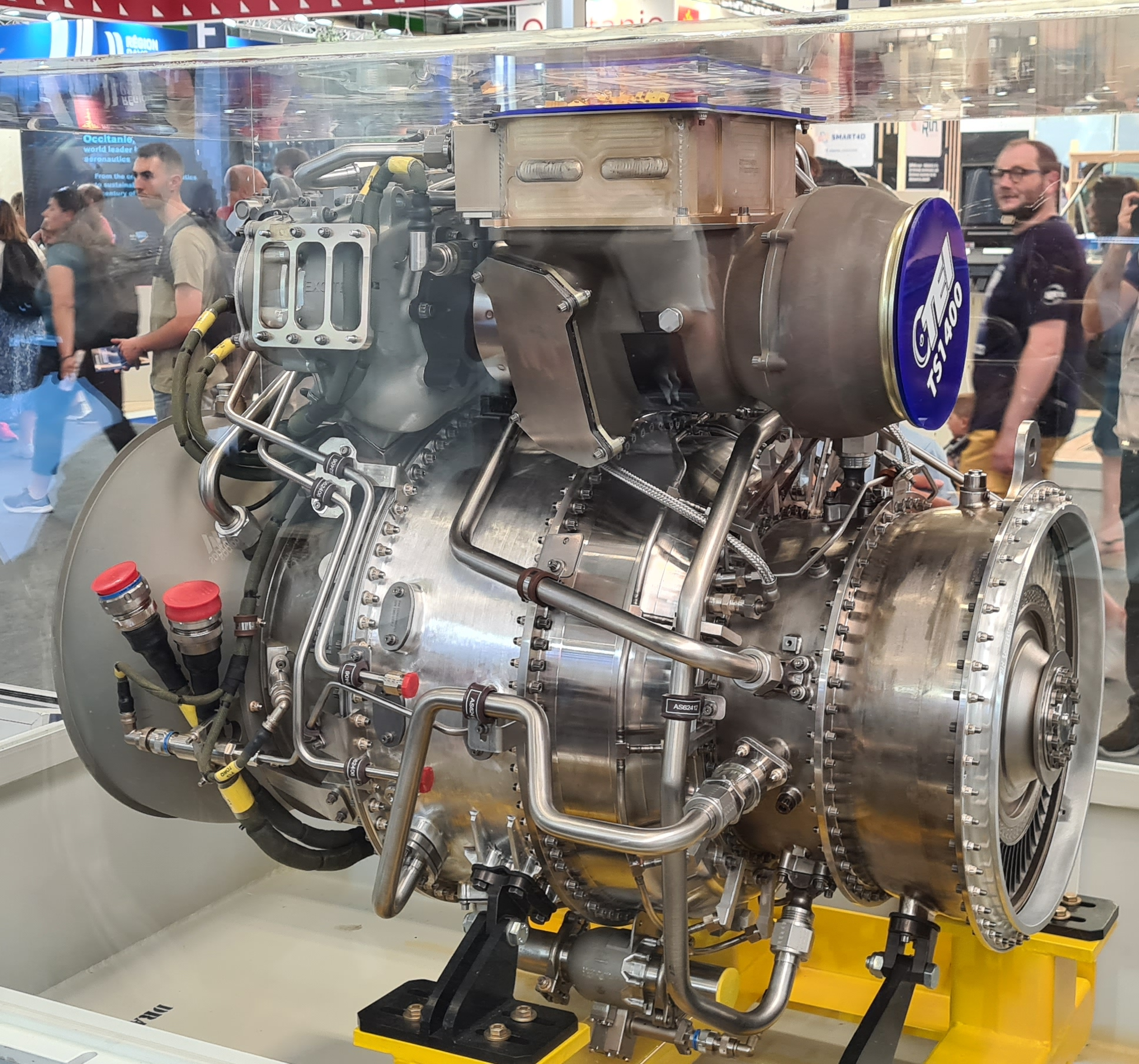
- TEI TS1400 turboshaft engine
- Type: Turboshaft
- National origin: Turkey
- Manufacturer: Tusaş Engine Industries (TEI)
- Major applications: TAI T625 Gökbey; T129 ATAK

The TEI TS1400 is a 1,400 shp turboshaft engine for rotary wing applications. It is developed by the Tusaş Engine Industries (TEI) in Turkey.

== Development ==
The "Turboshaft Engine Development Project" (Turkish: Turboşaft Motor Geliştirme Projesi, TMGP), launched on 7 March 2017, aims to reduce foreign dependency while increasing indigenousness rates. The first installment of the TEI TS1400 is planned on the TAI T625 Gökbey, a twin-engined light transport/utility helicopter developed by Turkish Aerospace Industries. The engine was introduced to the public on 11 December 2020. It was also announced that the engine may be used for T129 ATAK attack helicopter in the future. The engine made its first flight in April 2023, when the TAI T625 Gökbey utility helicopter completed its first test flight with the TS1400.By 2026, technical qualification testing of the TS1400 had been completed and the serial production configuration had been finalized. TEI General Manager Prof. Dr. Mahmut F. Akşit stated that the engine was ready for flight operations, but certification activities were still ongoing due to the civil certification requirements of the TAI T625 Gökbey helicopter platform.

Akşit further stated that the design organization approval and production organization certification phases had been completed, while type certification remained the final stage of the certification process.

== Specifications ==
Data from

==== General characteristics ====
- Type: turboshaft
- Length: 1,105 mm (43.5 in)
- Diameter: 404 mm (15.9 in)
- Dry weight: 180 kg (397 lb)

==== Components ====
- Compressor: 2-stage centrifugal
- Combustors: annular
- Turbine: 2-stage
- Fuel type: Jet A1
- Oil system: dry sump

==== Performance ====
- Maximum power output: 1,500 shp (1,100 kW)
- Overall pressure ratio: 12:1
- Turbine inlet temperature: 1,400 °C (2,552 °F)
- Power-to-weight ratio: 8.54 shp/kg (2.89 kW/lb)

Other

- 30 sec. single engine power output: 1,740 shp (1,300 kW)
- 120 sec. single engine power output: 1,660 shp (1,240 kW)
- Ceiling: 20,000 ft (6,100 m)
- Shaft output revolution: 23,000 rpm

== See also ==
Comparable engines

- Avco/Pratt & Whitney T800
- HAL/Turbomeca Shakti
- LHTEC T800
- Safran Arrano
