= TAI T925 =

Turkish heavy utility helicopter

T925
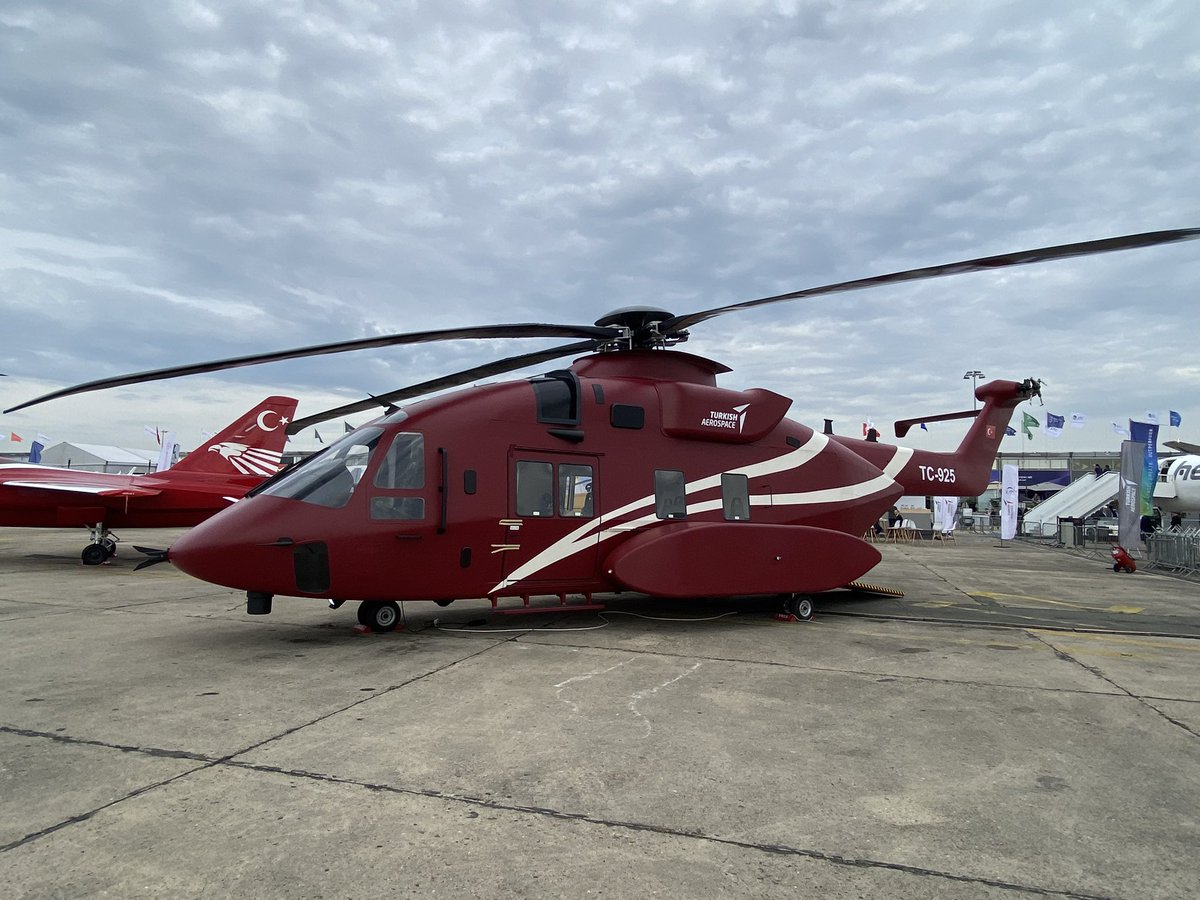

General information
- Type: heavy multirole helicopter
- National origin: Turkey
- Manufacturer: Turkish Aerospace Industries
- Designer: Turkish Aerospace Industries
- Status: in design

The TAI T925 is a twin-engined heavy transport/utility helicopter developed by Turkish Aerospace Industries.

== Design and development ==
The mock-up of helicopter was firstly presented at Paris Air Show 2023.

The helicopter is planned to be made in VIP transport version, transport version for troops and equipment, naval version, search and rescue, firefighting, medical transport.

The T925 will be unveiled in its final configuration by the end of this year. Its first flight is planned for the first quarter of 2027.

== Operators ==
=== Future operators ===
Turkey

- Ministry of Agriculture and Forestry of Turkey - 8 planned
- Turkish Land Forces
- Turkish Naval Forces
- Turkish Air Force
- Gendarmerie General Command
- Coast Guard Command

General characteristics

- Crew: 2
- Capacity: 19 passengers / troops
- Length: 19.95–20.2 m (65 ft 5 in – 66 ft 3 in)
- Height: 3.8 m (12 ft 6 in)
- Max takeoff weight: 11,500–12,000 kg (25,353–26,455 lb)
- Powerplant: 2 × TV3-117VMA-SBM1V turboshaft engines, 1,860 kW (2,490 hp) each
- Main rotor diameter: 1 main + tail rotor × 16.7–17.3 m (54 ft 9 in – 56 ft 9 in)

Performance

- Maximum speed: 324 km/h (201 mph, 175 kn)
- Cruise speed: 310–324 km/h (193–201 mph, 167–175 kn)
- Range: 520 km (320 mi, 280 nmi)
- Endurance: 2.75–3 hours
- Service ceiling: 6,096 m (20,000 ft)

Armament

- Guns: optional door-mounted machine guns (configurable)
- Hardpoints: external hardpoints (military configuration optional) , with provisions to carry combinations of:
  - Rockets: 70 mm unguided rockets (Hydra 70 / CRV7 class)
  - Missiles: *UMTAS anti-tank missiles
- Roketsan Cirit 70 mm guided rockets
- Air-to-air missiles (e.g. Stinger, Mistral, Bozdoğan, AIM-9) depending on configuration

Avionics

- Digital glass cockpit
- Fly-by-wire assisted controls
- Mission computer architecture
- Search & rescue radar
- EO/IR targeting system
- NVG compatible cockpit

== See also ==
- Mil Mi-17
- T70
- TAI T625
