= TAI T629 =

Turkish attack helicopter

T629

General information
- Type: Attack helicopter Unmanned attack helicopter
- National origin: Turkey
- Manufacturer: Turkish Aerospace Industries
- Status: Under development
- Primary user: Turkish Armed Forces

The TAI T629 is a medium-weight attack helicopter currently being developed by Turkish Aerospace Industries (TAI).

The T629 has more carrying capacity and extra one tonne of compared to the T129 ATAK, but less than the heavier T929 ATAK 2 that is also being developed. Unlike the Italian and Turkish partnership with the T129, the T629 is being developed by Turkey only.

== Development ==
The T629 project started on August 14, 2017. TAI began assembling the first flight model of the helicopter in 2019. No technical details of the helicopter have been revealed so far, except the MTOW (max take-off weight); which is 6 tonnes. It is expected that the helicopter will carry launchers of 70 mm unguided missiles and L-UMTAS anti-tank missiles. The first variant (manned) was revealed in June 2020. The second variant (unmanned) was revealed on February 25, 2021. The T629 shares common systems with TAI T625 Gökbey multi-utility helicopter.

== Variants ==
There are two variants of the T-629. One unmanned and electric variant, and one classic-style manned variant. It is expected for the unmanned and electrical variant to be used in critical missions since it will be quieter.

== Future operators ==
Turkey

- Turkish Land Forces
- Turkish Naval Forces

== See also ==
- TAI/AgustaWestland T129 ATAK
- TAI T625 Gökbey
- TAI T929 ATAK 2
