= TAI/AgustaWestland T129 ATAK =

Turkish attack and armed reconnaissance helicopter

T129 ATAK
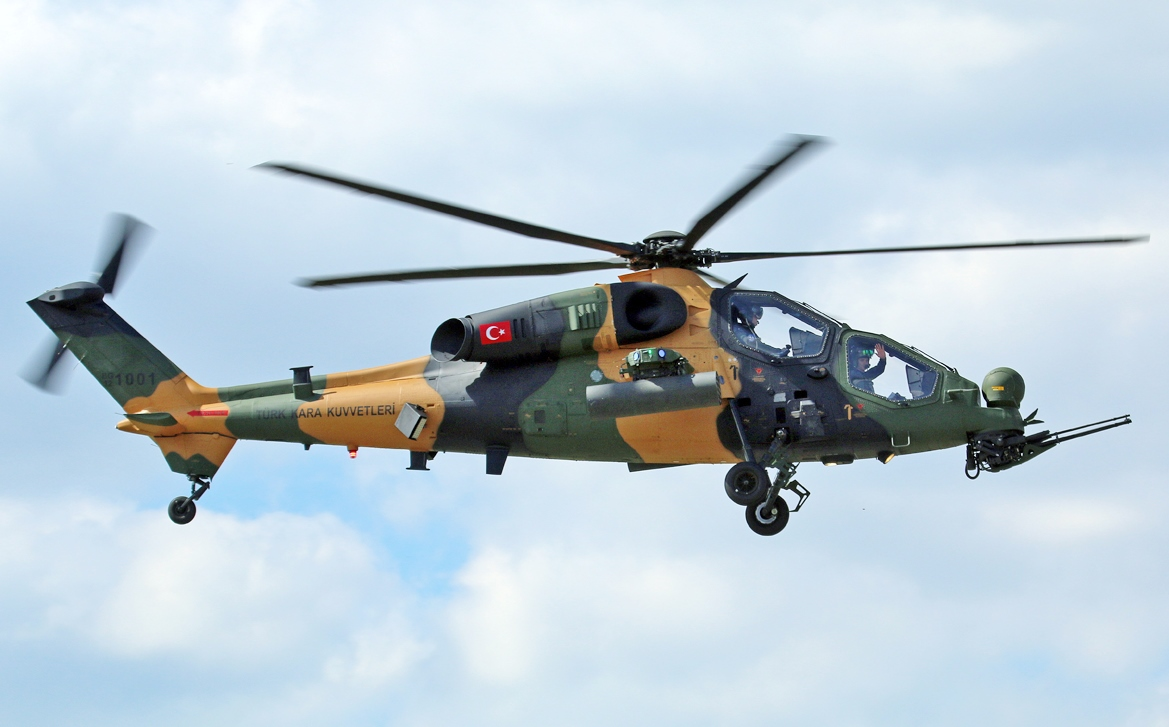

General information
- Type: Attack helicopter
- National origin: Turkey
- Manufacturer: Turkish Aerospace Industries (TAI)
- Designer: Turkish Aerospace Industries (TAI) / AgustaWestland (Leonardo from 2017)
- Status: In service
- Primary users: Turkish Army Gendarmerie General Command; General Directorate of Security (Turkey); Philippine Air Force
- Number built: 100 (+7 prototypes) (2023)

History
- Manufactured: 2009–present
- Introduction date: 2014
- First flight: 28 September 2009
- Developed from: Agusta A129 Mangusta

The TAI/AgustaWestland T129 ATAK is a twin-engine, tandem seat, multi-role, all-weather attack helicopter based on the Agusta A129 Mangusta platform. It was developed by Turkish Aerospace Industries (TAI) in partnership with Leonardo S.p.A. The helicopter is designed for armed reconnaissance and attack missions in hot and high environments and rough geography in both day and night conditions.

The ATAK programme was begun to meet the requirements of the Turkish Armed Forces for an armed tactical reconnaissance and attack helicopter. The T129 is the result of the integration of Turkish-developed avionics, airframe modifications, and weapon systems onto the AgustaWestland A129 airframe, with upgraded engines, transmission and rotor blades. It is in use by the Turkish Army and other services including the Turkish Gendarmerie. The helicopter has a unit cost of roughly US$50 million.

== Development ==
=== Origins ===
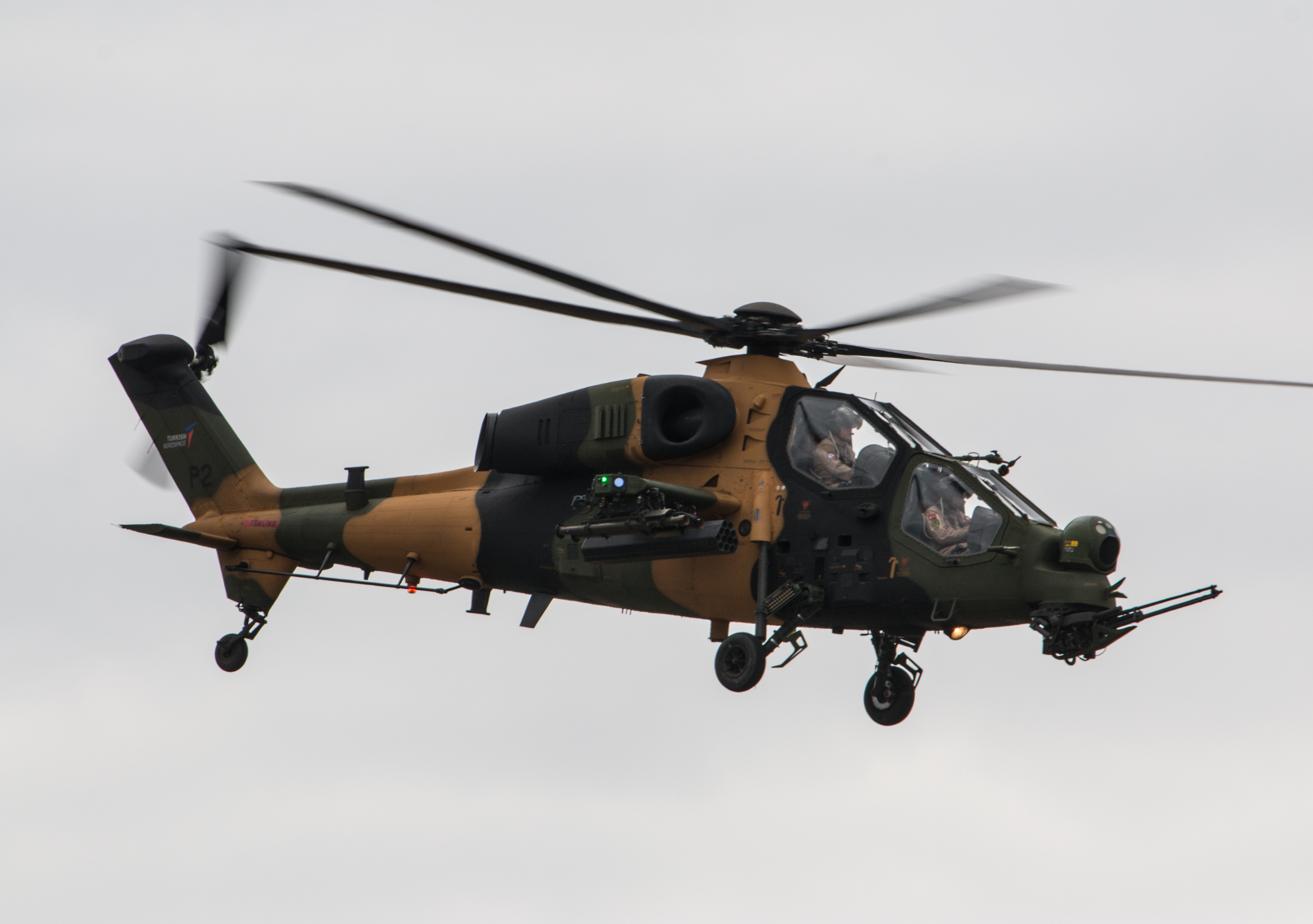
T129 ATAK at Farnborough International Airshow 2018, Hampshire

The ATAK programme was begun to meet the Turkish Armed Forces' requirements for an attack and tactical reconnaissance helicopter. Turkey announced on 30 March 2007 that it had decided to negotiate with AgustaWestland to co-develop and produce 51 (with 40 options) attack helicopters based on the Agusta A129 Mangusta. It is to be assembled in Turkey by Turkish Aerospace Industries (TAI) as the T129. On 7 September 2007, a $1.2 billion contract was signed.

On 22 June 2008, the agreement between TUSAS Aerospace Industries (TAI) and AgustaWestland formally entered into force. Under the agreement, TAI would develop an indigenous mission computer, avionics, weapons systems, self-protection suites and the helmet-mounting cuing systems. Tusaş Engine Industries (TEI) would manufacture the LHTEC CTS800-4N engines under licence. Under the agreement, Turkey has full marketing and intellectual property rights for the T129 platform; Turkey can export also the platform to third party nations, excluding Italy and the United Kingdom. However, the T129's LHTEC CTS800-4N gives the United States a veto over any prospective export sales and so Turkey developed its own TEI TS1400 powerplant. About 95% of the initial parts of the serial production T129 are manufactured in Turkey.

On 16 July 2007, the Scientific and Technological Research Council of Turkey (TUBITAK), Meteksan Savunma Sanayii AŞ and Bilkent University formed a consortium to develop an advanced millimetre wave radar (MILDAR), similar to the Longbow and the IAI/ELTA radars, intended to enter service in 2009. MILDAR was successfully completed development in February 2012.

In 2007, it was reported that one helicopter will be kept by the Turkish Ministry of Defense and used as a systems development testbed while the remaining 50 T129s will be delivered to the Turkish Army. An optional 40 further T129s will be produced if necessary. These rotorcraft would be designated T129B. In November 2010, Turkey ordered an additional nine T129s, increasing its total on order to 60. These T129s were for an urgent Turkish Army operational requirement and was built by TAI for delivery in 2012, one year prior to the delivery of the previously ordered 51 helicopters. Designated T129A, these lack advanced anti-tank missiles; as a result of delays, they entered service in 2014.

=== Flight testing ===
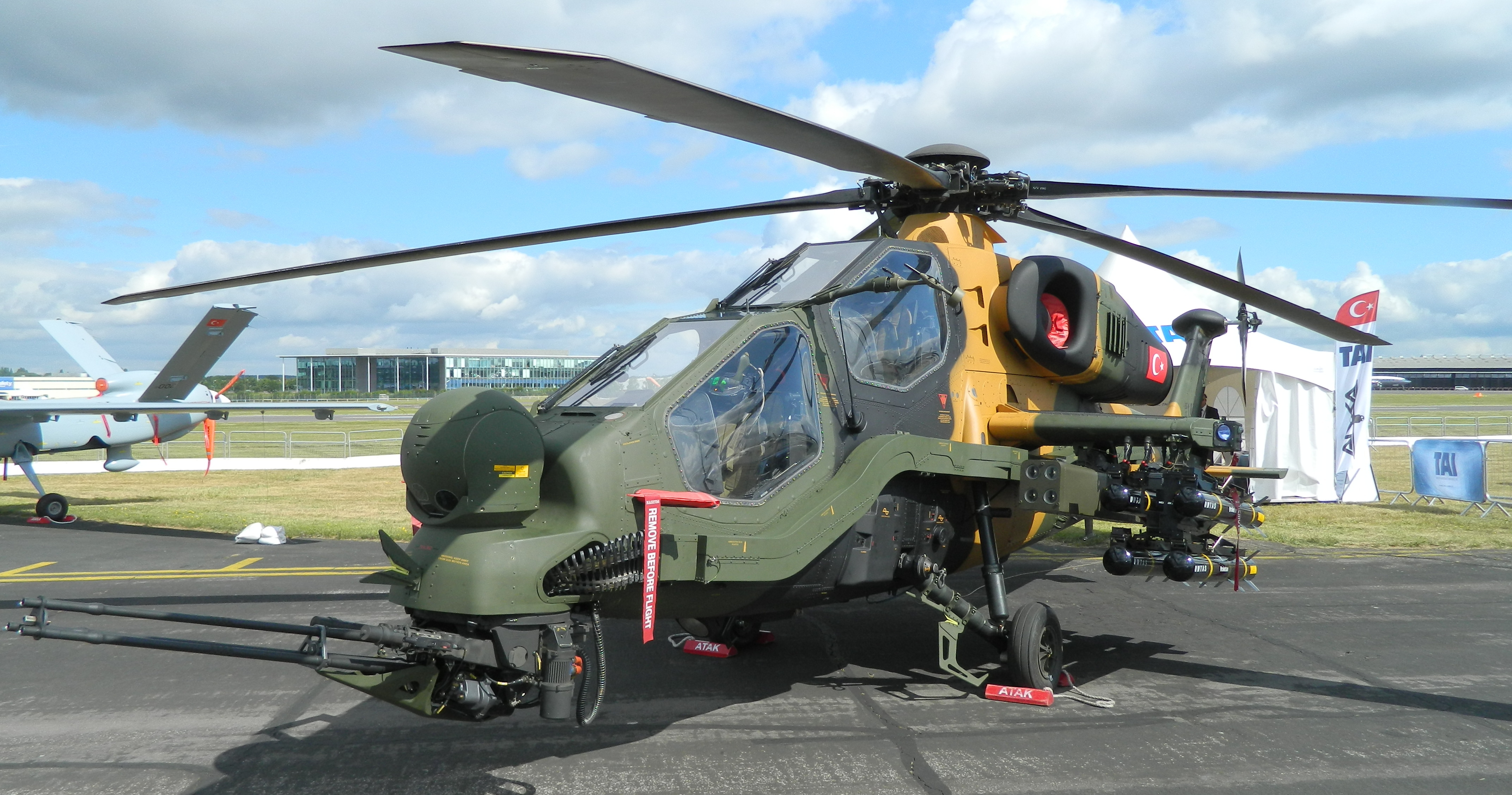
T129 "1001" on display at the 2014 Farnborough Air Display

On 28 September 2009, the T129's maiden flight took place when the P1 prototype flew at AgustaWestland's facilities in Vergiate, Italy. On 19 March 2010, the first T129 prototype (P1) conducted high-altitude hover tests near Verbania, Italy following the completion of several successful test flights. During the hover test, T129 P1 lost its tail rotor at 15,000 feet. Test pilot Cassioli regained enough control to steer away from a residential area before crashing; the crew escaped without serious injuries. On 17 August 2011, TAI announced the first successful flight of the T129 prototype "P6", the first of three prototypes to be assembled in Turkey.

In 2013, media reports claimed that the first batch of helicopters delivered to the Turkish Army for trials did not meet the contracted requirements, specifically in terms of "vibration, balance, weight". The T129 was nose-heavy; to resolve this, 137 kg was added to the tail, causing the total weight to exceed the specified requirement. The higher weight may decrease the T129's service ceiling, which is detrimental for operating under hot and high conditions, like those found in Southeastern Anatolia. The Undersecretariat for Defense Industries will adjust the contract in accordance, although experts expect weight reductions as development continues.

On 22 April 2014, TAI formally delivered the first serial production T129 to the Turkish Land Forces. A total of nine T129s of the first batch were delivered to the Turkish Land Forces after completing qualification testing.

HAVELSAN developed a simulator system for the T129 and presented it at the International Defence Industry Fair (IDEF) 2017.

== Design ==
The T129 ATAK is optimized for "hot and high conditions", performance requirements against challenging geographical and environmental conditions in night and day operations. It has several key improvements over the original A129 inline with the requirements of the Turkish Army. The T129 has been designed to achieve a high level of maneuverability, high impact resistance and ballistic tolerance, along with a reduced visibility, sound and radar silhouette.

The helicopter is equipped with the Hunter Kaska integrated control system. This system, which was purpose-designed for the T129, enables the automatic orientation of target detection and weapon systems to the pilot's line of sight with high tracking accuracy. The T129 is also equipped with a dedicated electro-optical FLIR system ASELFLIR-300T, suitable for multi-purpose mission operations, it is manufactured by the Turkish company Aselsan. The rotorcraft is also equipped with advanced electronic warfare and countermeasure systems which increase survival capabilities in combat situations. These systems include a Radar Warning Receiver (RIAS), Radar Frequency Mixer (RFKS) and a Laser Receiver (LIAS) in addition to an automatic Countermeasure Firing System (KTAS).

The T129 can be used in a variety of roles, including anti-armour, armed reconnaissance, ground attack, escort, asymmetrical, fire support and short range anti-aircraft missions. It is equipped with a single 20 mm three-barrel rotary cannon fitted on a nose turret with 500 rounds of ammunition. The T129 can also be equipped with up to eight UMTAS 160 mm long range anti-tank missiles, 76 unguided 70mm rockets for close air support, 16 CIRIT 70 mm missiles and eight air launched Stinger short range air-to-air missiles.

== Operational history ==
=== Turkey ===
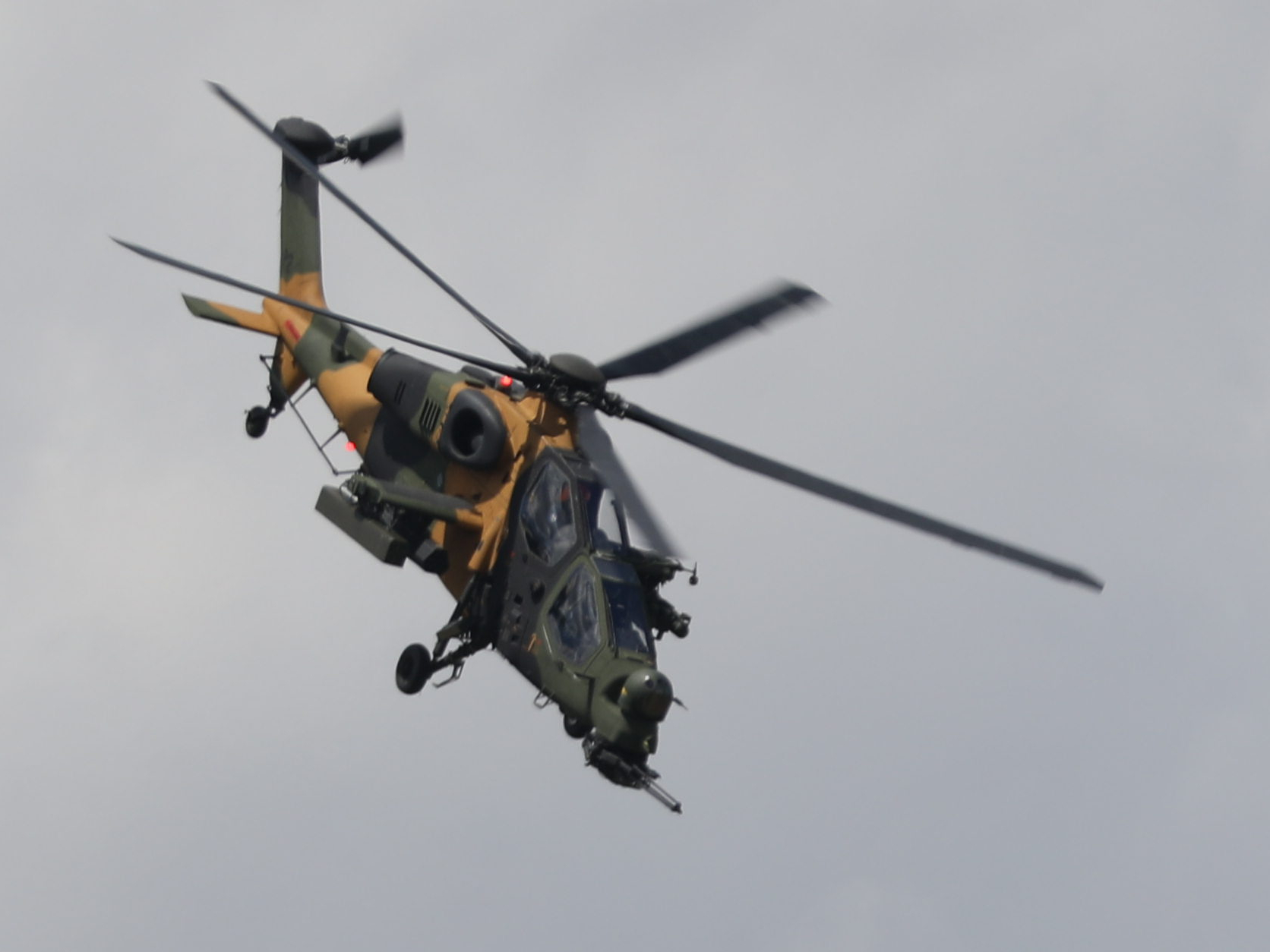
T129 performing an aerial display at the Paris Air Show 2019

In May 2014, the Turkish Army formally inducted the first nine T129s into service; these initial rotorcraft were to a less advanced interim T129A EDH model, intended to replace some of the ageing AH-1s in use prior to the introduction of the more capable T129B variant to service. On 25 April 2015, a pair of T129s were used in combat for the first time in a counter-terrorism operation in Turkey's Siirt Province. Delivery of the final EDH-standard T129s took place on 31 July 2015.

On 10 February 2018, during the Turkish military operation in Afrin, northern Syria, a Turkish Army T129 was shot down by Kurdish People's Protection Units (YPG) anti-aircraft fire. The loss was confirmed by the Turkish Armed Forces and President Erdoğan.

=== Philippines ===
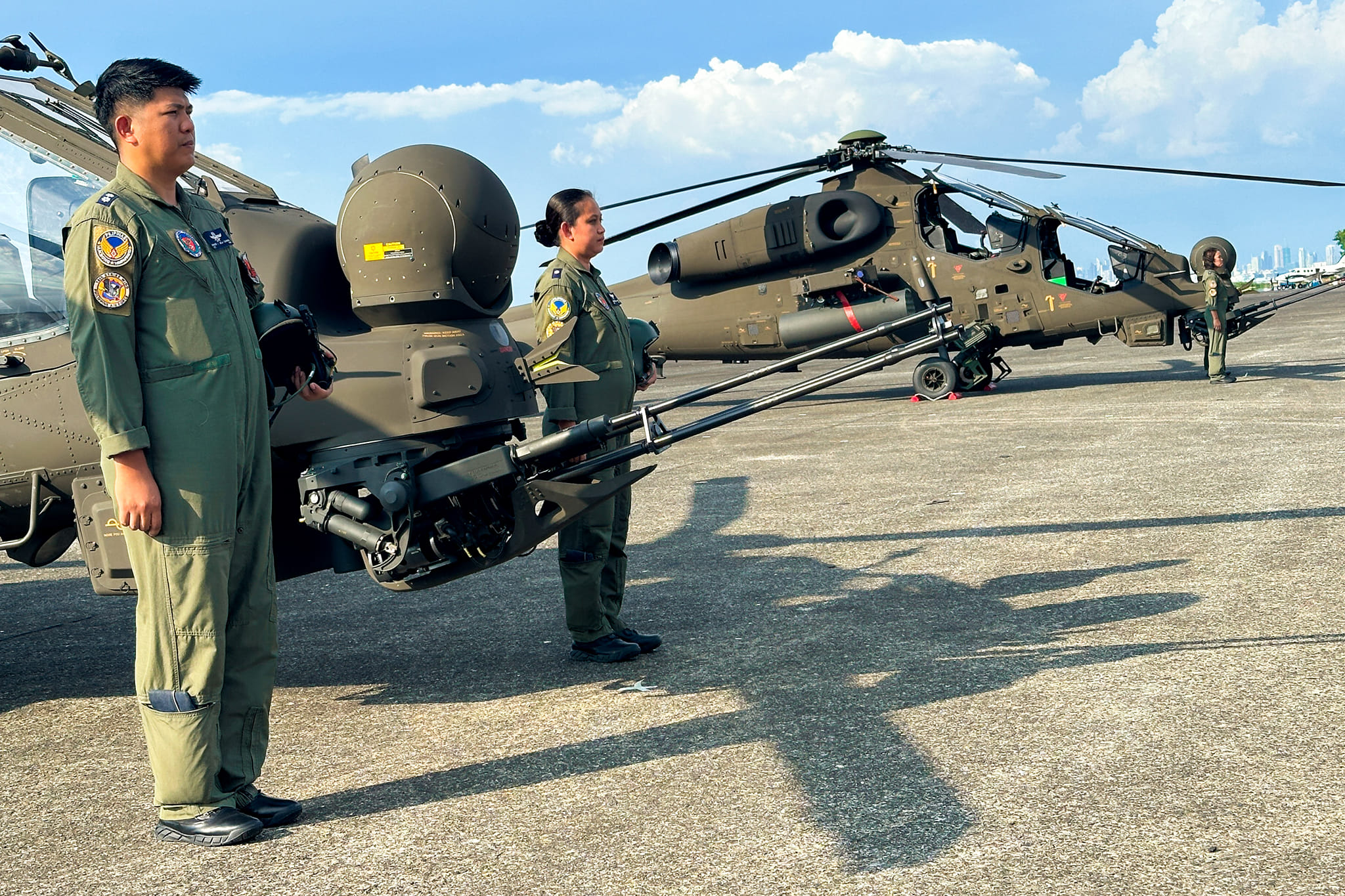
Philippine Air Force T-129B delivery in 2024

When the Philippine Air Force (PAF) re-evaluated its capabilities and performance after the siege of Marawi in 2017 against ISIS-inspired terrorists, it found that the MD-520MG Defender and the newer AW-109E Power armed helicopters did not have sufficient firepower. Instead of acquiring more light armed helicopters, the PAF favoured purpose-built attack helicopters, even if acquired in smaller quantities. The Philippine Air Force was offered the Boeing AH-64 Apache, the Bell AH-1Z Viper and the TAI/AgustaWestland T129 ATAK. In 2018, the Technical Working Group (TWG) of the PAF selected the T129 due to its lower acquisition costs. TAI was able to offer six T129s for the approved budget of around Php 13.8 Billion to be paid through Multi Year Contractual Authorities.

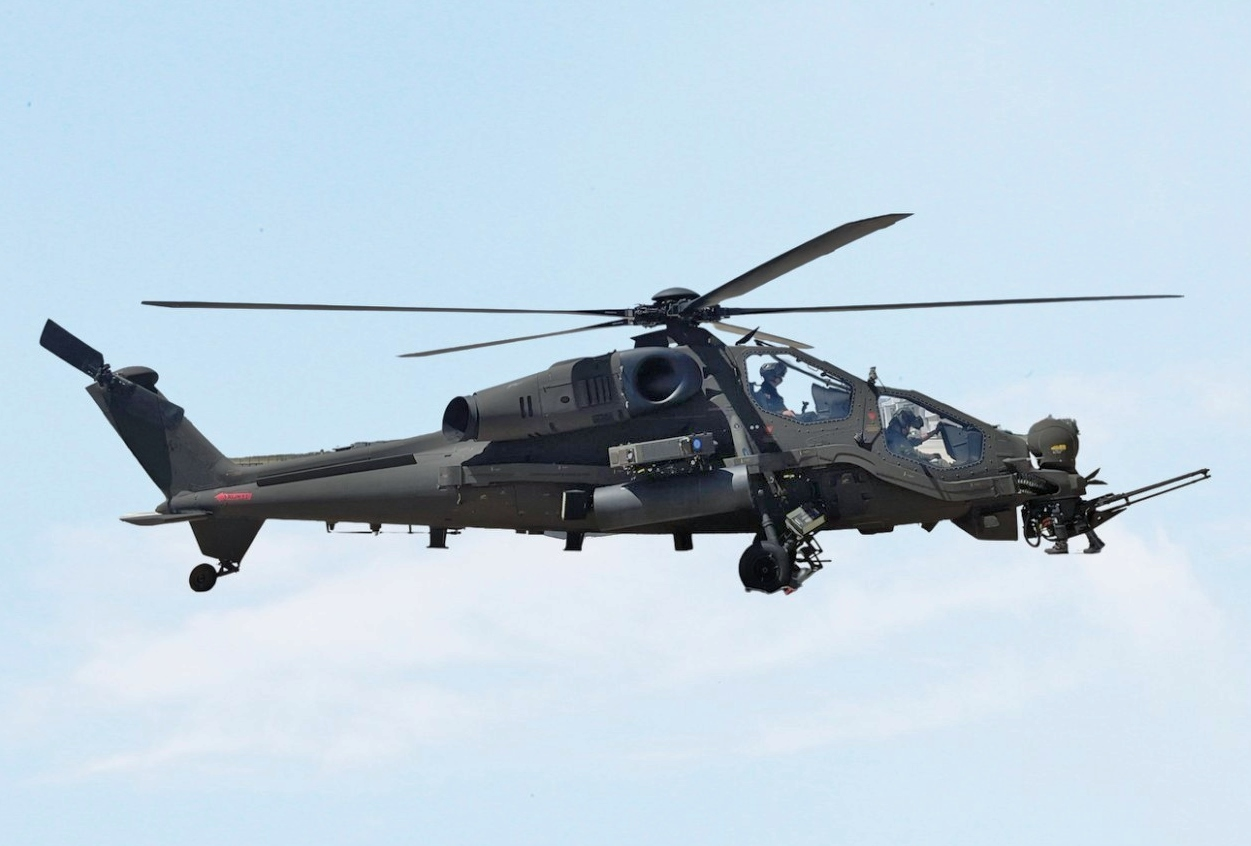
One of the first T129Bs delivered to the Philippine Air Force (Note: Image is mirrored.).

In 2021, the Department of National Defense signed a contract for six T129Bs for Php13.7 billion using Multi Year Contractual Authorities via a government-to-government deal with the Turkish Ministry of Defense. By December 2022, a total of four T129Bs and accompanying spare parts and logistical support had been accepted by the PAF; the last two helicopters were expected to be completed and delivered by 2023. The T129Bs are to be deployed to the 15th Strike Wing.

In May 2024, two more T129s formally entered active duty, effectively completing the delivery of six helicopters.

=== Nigeria ===
According to a statement by the Turkish Aerospace Industries General Manager Temel Kotil during the Farnborough Airshow, TAI will provide six T129s to Nigeria under a recent contract. In January 2023, the Nigerian Air Chief announced that Nigeria will receive six T129s by the end of the first quarter of 2023. In November 2023, Nigeria took delivery of two T129 ATAK helicopters and have been effectively operational in the war against insurgency.

=== Potential operators ===
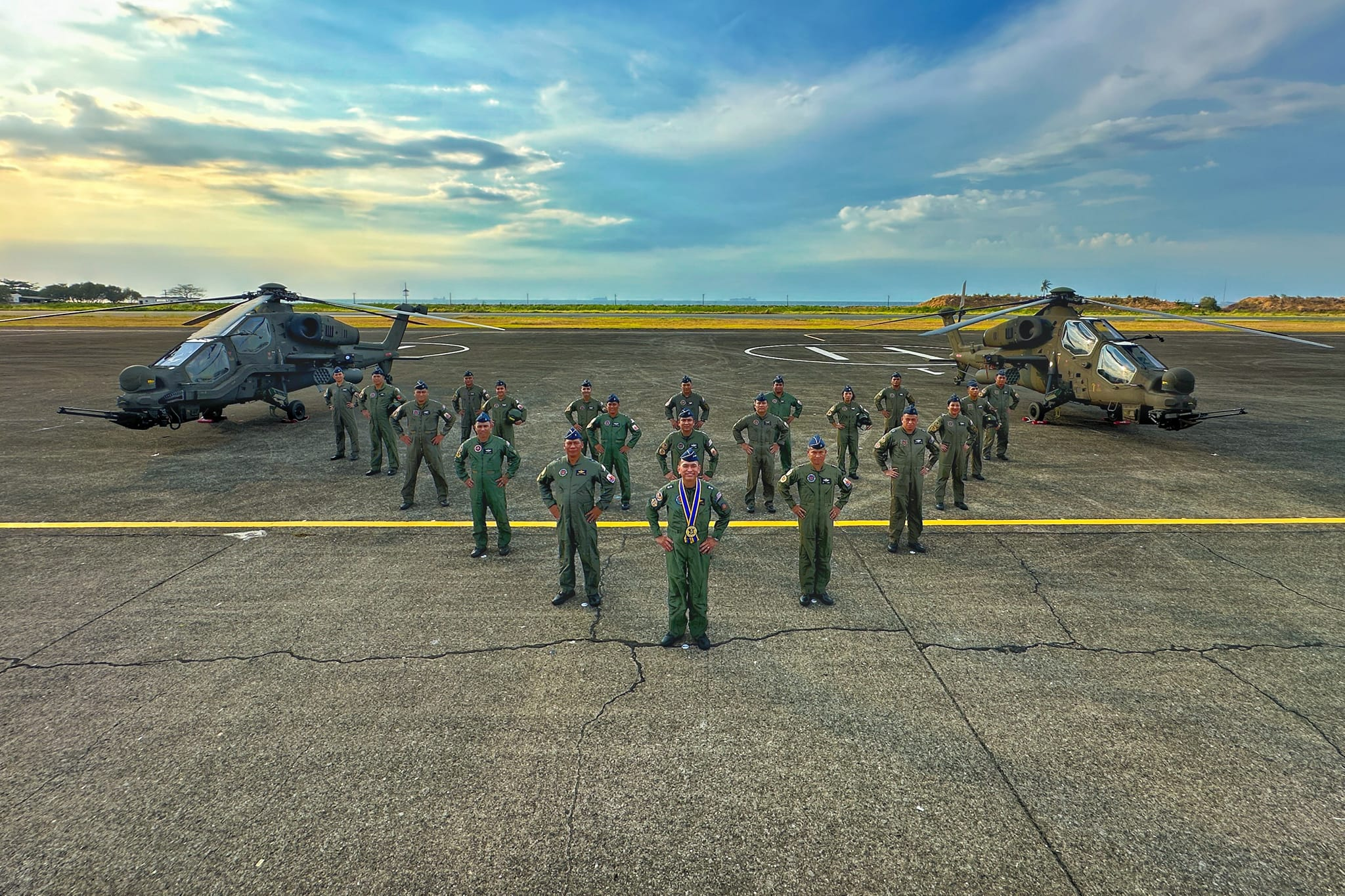
Two T129s in 2024

==== Bangladesh ====
According to Türkiye Today, a US$600-million deal was approved in January 2026.

==== Brazil ====
In September 2018, Brazil showed interest in acquiring the T129 with army officials visiting Turkey. In March 2019, ten Brazilian Army pilots received certificates for completing T129 test flights at Forte Ricardo Kirk, Taubaté.

==== Iraq ====
In an Iraqi TV broadcast, the Iraqi defense minister announced in August 2021 that Iraq will acquire 12 T129 ATAK helicopters.

==== Pakistan ====
In 2017, Pakistan indicated that it was interested in possibly purchasing the T129 for the Pakistan Army Aviation Corps (PAAC), as a replacement to their ageing Bell AH-1F Cobra gunships; the PAAC had extensively tested the T129 and the Z-10ME in 2016.

In May 2018, Turkey's ruling Justice and Development Party (AK Parti) announced that Pakistan is purchasing 30 T129s for US$1.5 billion, which Turkish Aerospace Industries (TAI) confirmed in July. However, Pakistan's T129 purchase has been politically complicated; the United States Department of Defense (DoD) refused to issue the export license for the LHTEC T800-4A engines that power the gunships owing to diplomatic issues between the United States and Turkey. In 2020, Pakistan granted a one-year extension to TAI so that the latter could persuade the DoD to issue the required export license; TAI also approached its sister company, Tusaş Engine Industries, to develop an indigenous engine for the T129 as a possible replacement for the T800-4A. TAI also hired a U.S-based lobbying firm, Capitol Counsel, to promote the issue to U.S. lawmakers. In 2021, Pakistan granted a six-month extension to TAI in a further bid to resolve the issue.

In January 2022, multiple reports of Pakistan cancelling the T129 deal in favor of the Z-10ME emerged. However, the Pakistani military's public relations wing - the Inter-Services Public Relations (ISPR), denied the reports, stating that the deal had not been terminated. As of 2024 the deal remains uncertain as Pakistan is moving towards the Chinese Changhe Z-10 attack helicopter.

==== Qatar ====
In January 2019, it was reported that Qatar had signed a preliminary agreement to buy T129s.

==== Saudi Arabia ====
In 2011, Saudi Arabia asked Turkey to enter a tender to produce attack helicopters for the Saudi Air Force.

=== Failed bids ===
==== Morocco ====
On 31 July 2021, it was reported that Morocco was in the "advanced stage of negotiation" with Turkey for the purchase of 22 T129s. Additional sources claimed previous negotiations were suspended in 2018 due to US sanctions.

==== South Korea ====
In January 2013, a media report stated that South Korea's attack helicopter competition included the T129 in the final three bidders with the Bell AH-1Z Viper and the Boeing AH-64 Apache. However, the AH-64E Apache was chosen in April 2013.

== Variants ==
T129A EDH (Erken Duhul Helikopteri or Early Delivery Helicopter)
T129A is the "combat support" version equipped with a 20 mm gatling gun and rounds and can carry 70 mm (2.75 in) rockets; nine T129As have been ordered. Six helicopters have been delivered to the Turkish Army. The T129As are to be upgraded to the T129B standard.

T129B
T129B is the "multi-role" version equipped with electronic warfare systems. 51 helicopters are to be produced, with one to be used as a weapons testbed. The T129B is armed with a 20 mm gatling gun and can carry a varied payload of eight UMTAS ATGMs, 16 Cirit missiles, eight air launched Stinger, 76 70 mm (2.75 in) unguided rockets.

== Operators ==
Nigeria

- Nigerian Air Force - 6 aircraft delivered from order for 6 aircraft signed in 2021.

Philippines

- Philippine Air Force - 6 aircraft delivered as of December 2023 and 24 units planned.

Somalia

- Somali Air Force - 3 aircraft were delivered to Somalia in March 2025 for anti-insurgency operations against Harakat al-Shabaab al-Mujahideen. An additional three helicopters were delivered to Somalia in June 2025.

Turkey

- Turkish Land Forces - 58 delivered, with 35 more options (5 Phase-II)
- Gendarmerie General Command - 16 delivered out of 23 ordered (4 Phase-II)
- General Directorate of Security (Turkey) - 4 for the Aviation Department (all Phase-II)

Bangladesh

- Bangladesh Air Force – Ordered 6 T-129 ATAK helicopters from Turkey in 2025, with estimated deliveries by 2027.

== Specifications (T129 ATAK) ==
T129 3-view image

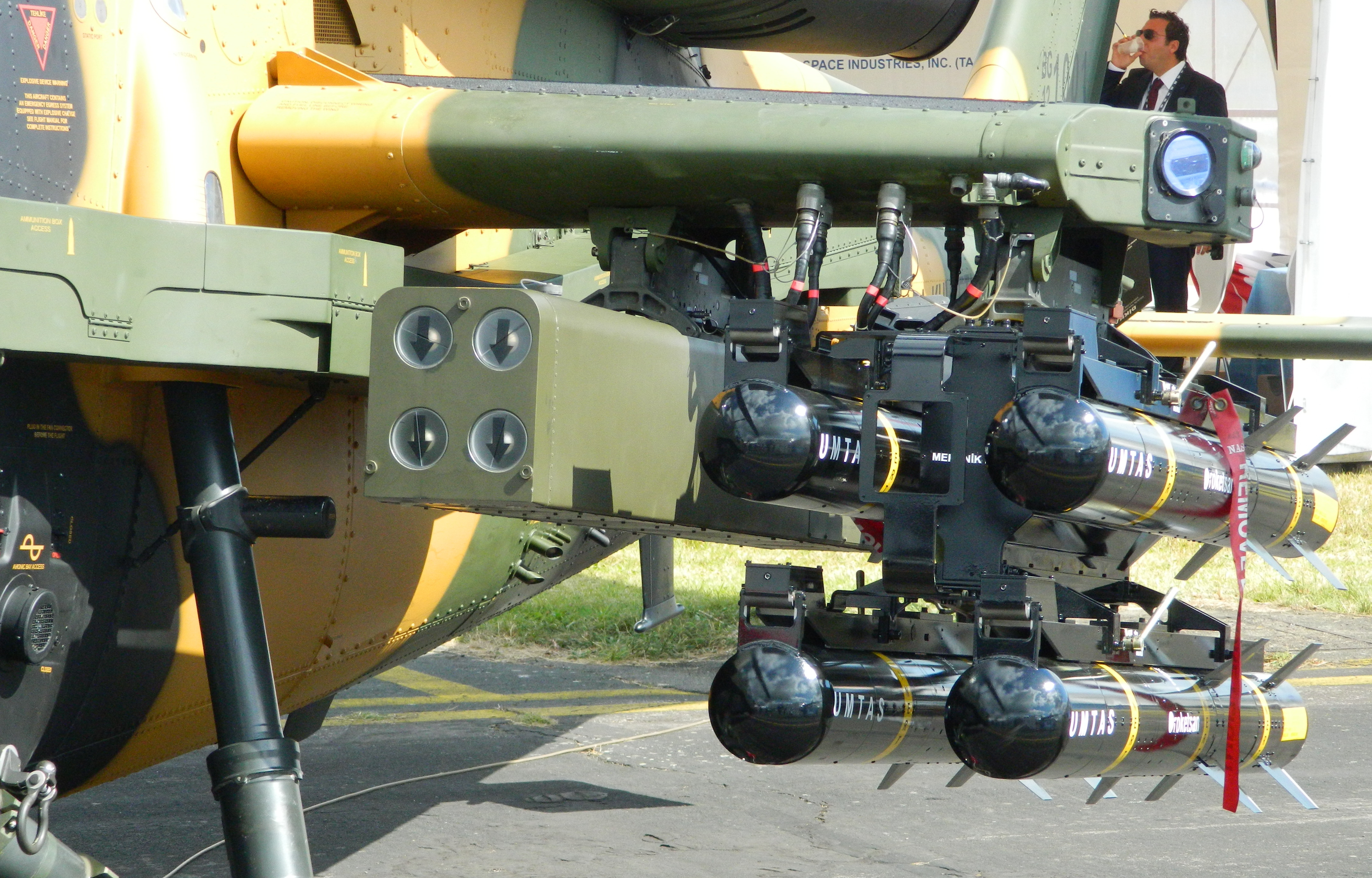
TAI T129 Attack Helicopter armed with UMTAS

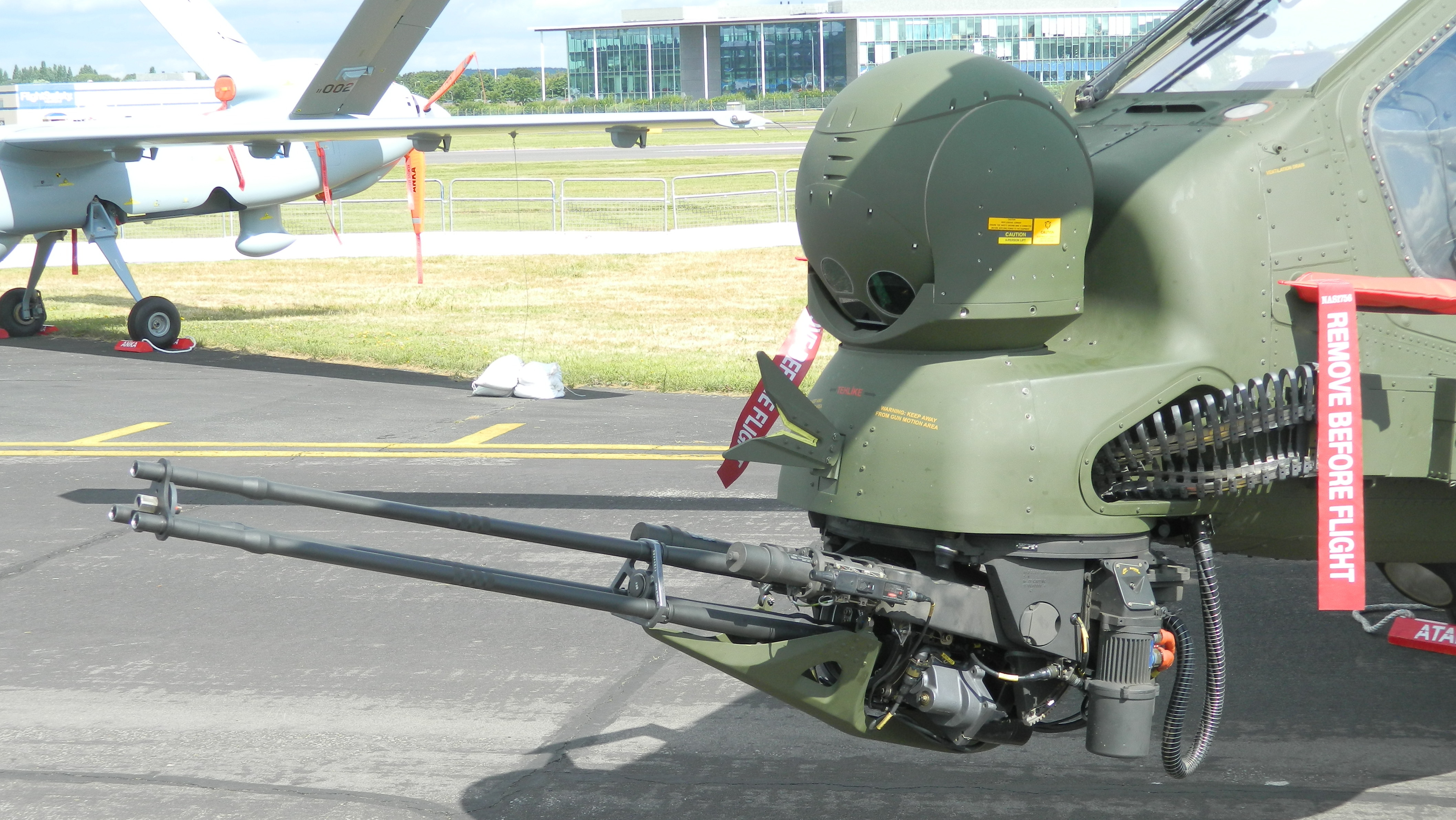
M197 20 mm three-barrel rotary cannon and ASELFLIR-300T electro-optical FLIR system

Data from Turkish Aerospace Industries

General characteristics

- Crew: 2
- Length: 14.54 m (47 ft 8 in)
- Height: 3.4 m (11 ft 2 in)
- Max takeoff weight: 5,056 kg (11,147 lb)
- Powerplant: 2 × LHTEC CTS800-4A turboshaft, 1,024 kW (1,373 hp) each
- Main rotor diameter: 11.9 m (39 ft 1 in)
- Main rotor area: 111.22 m^{2} (1,197.2 sq ft)

Performance

- Maximum speed: 281 km/h (175 mph, 152 kn) ("maximum cruise speed")
- Range: 537 km (334 mi, 290 nmi)
- Ferry range: 1,000 km (620 mi, 540 nmi)
- Endurance: 3 hr
- Service ceiling: 4,572 m (15,000 ft)
- Rate of climb: 13.26 m/s (2,610 ft/min) , vertical climb rate 7.3 m/s

Armament

- Guns: 1× M197 20x102 mm (0.787 in) three-barrel rotary cannon (500 rounds)
- Hardpoints: 4 , with provisions to carry combinations of:
  - Rockets: maximum 4 pods with
    - 76 (19×4) / 48 (12×4): 70 mm (2.75 in) unguided rockets such as MKE FFAR, Hydra 70, CRV7
  - Missiles:
    - 8 (4×2) UMTAS: 160 mm UMTAS and L-UMTAS anti-tank guided missiles.
    - 16 (4×4) Cirit: 70 mm guided missile used against lightly armored / unarmored targets
    - 8 (2×4) Air-to-Air Stinger (ATAS): short range air-to-air missile
  - Other: 2 (1×2) Drop tanks: 294 kg each

Avionics

- Aselsan ASELFLIR-300T electro-optical targeting system electro-optical FLIR system
- Aselsan ASELFLIR-410

== See also ==
Related development

- Agusta A129 Mangusta
- TAI T629
- TAI T929 ATAK 2 (T129 successor)

Aircraft of comparable role, configuration, and era

- AgustaWestland Apache
- Bell AH-1Z Viper
- Boeing AH-64 Apache
- CAIC Z-10
- Denel Rooivalk
- Eurocopter Tiger
- HAL Prachand
- Harbin WZ-19
- IAIO Toufan
- Kamov Ka-50/Ka-52
- Mil Mi-28
- Panha 2091

Related lists

- List of attack aircraft
- List of rotorcraft
