= Air-to-Air Stinger =

American short ranged air-to-air missile

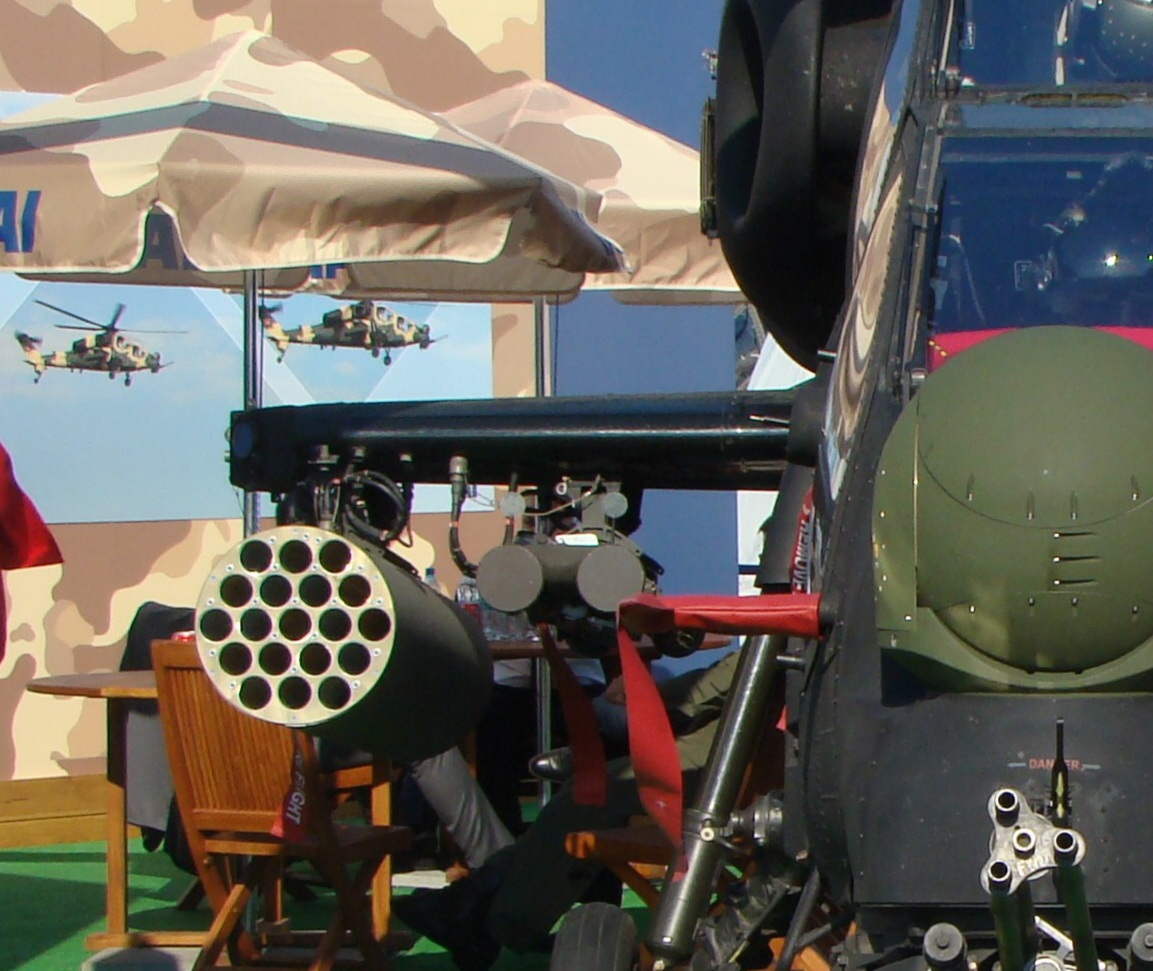
Turkish T129 ATAK helicopter with two air-to-air Stinger missiles mounted under-wing

The Air-to-Air Stinger (ATAS) (also unofficially called AIM-92 Stinger) is an air-to-air missile system developed from the shoulder-launched FIM-92 Stinger, for use on helicopters such as the AH-64 Apache, T129 ATAK, Eurocopter Tiger, and also UAVs such as the MQ-1 Predator. The missile itself is identical to the shoulder-launched Stinger.

== Development ==
The US Army has used the ATAS variant on its OH-58D Kiowa Warrior and UH-60 Black Hawk helicopters in the air-to-air role.

In a 19 November 1996 demonstration, a Stinger (ATAS) Block-1 missile was launched from an OH-58D at the Yuma Proving Ground and successfully destroyed a QUH-1 drone helicopter deploying countermeasures at a range greater than 2.8 miles (4,500 m).

All Air-to-Air Stinger (ATAS) Block II missiles will be modified existing Stinger RMP missiles (FIM-92C). Block II will incorporate various improvements including a new staring IR focal plane array seeker, a new battery, and advanced signal processing capabilities. The seeker permits engagements of helicopters in clutter out to the 5.0 mi (8 km) maximum physical range of the missile, also improved accuracy and IRCCM capabilities, and will provide a full night capability. The Block II missile also supports seeker slaving (steering the missile's seeker off-axis before launch to lock onto targets). This was first demonstrated on 6 November 1997 at Yuma.

ATAL is an upgrade to the Air-to-Air Stinger launcher fielded on the OH-58D Kiowa Warrior and Blackhawk helicopters. In mid 2000, tests were carried out with the ATAL system mounted on the AH-64 Apache Longbow helicopter. Nine missiles were fired, eight of which scored direct hits against simulated hovering helicopter targets in a cluttered environment. The missiles were launched with the Longbow helicopter traveling at speeds from hovering to 136 knots (157 mph; 252 km/h), side slips up to 30 knots (35 mph; 56 km/h), partial power descents, pull-up maneuvers, hovering pedal turns, push-over maneuvers, and a 22-degree bank.

== Operational history ==
An Iraqi MiG-25 shot down a Predator drone performing reconnaissance over the no fly zone in Iraq on 23 December 2002. Predators had been armed with Stingers, and were being used to "bait" Iraqi fighter planes, then run. In this incident, the Predator, with a top speed of 135 mph (117 kn; 217 km/h), and a ceiling of 25,000 ft (7,600 m), could not run from the MiG-25, which has a top speed of 1,900 mph (1,700 kn; 3,100 km/h), and a ceiling of 78,740 ft (24,000 m), so it fired a Stinger missile. The Stinger failed to hit the MIG, possibly because it could not distinguish between the heat signatures of the MIG and the missile it fired. The missile fired by the MiG destroyed the Predator. This was the first time in history a conventional aircraft and a drone had engaged in combat.

== Models ==
There are three variants of Air-to-Air Stinger (ATAS):

=== ATAS ===
The original Air-to-Air Stinger (ATAS) is an adaptation of the early versions man-portable Stinger System including FIM-92B and C. It is a lightweight missile designed to engage low-altitude targets.

=== ATAS Block I ===
The ATAS Block I is an upgrade to the sensors and software to upgrade the ATAS to FIM-92E standard.

=== ATAS Block II ===
All Air-to-Air Stinger (ATAS) Block II missiles will be modified existing Stinger RMP missiles. The Block II retrofit program will add the Block I modifications plus incorporate a staring IR focal plane array seeker, a new battery, and advanced signal processing capabilities. The new seeker will permit engagements of helicopters in clutter out to the kinematic range of the missile. The missile and launcher will be MIL-STD-1760 compatible. The Block II program will also extend shelf life, improve accuracy and IRCCM capabilities, and will provide a full night capability.

== General characteristics ==
As FIM-92 Stinger

- Length: 1.52 m (60 in)
- Diameter: 70 mm (2.8 in)
- Wingspan: 140 mm (5.5 in)
- Launch weight: 16 kg (35 lb)
- Guidance: Fire-and-forget passive infrared seeker for Block I and Fire-and-forget passive IR focal plane array seeker in Block II version
- Warhead: 3 kg (6.6 lb) HE blast fragmentation
- Propulsion: Dual thrust solid fuel rocket motor
- Speed: Mach 2.2 (750 m/s (1,700 mph; 2,700 km/h))
- Range: 8 km (5.0 mi)
