= Metis =

Metis or Métis may refer to:

== Ethnic groups ==
- Métis, North American Indigenous communities
- Métis (Belgian Congo), mixed-race children

== Places ==
- Metis Shoal, the tip of a submarine volcano in Tonga
- Metiș, a village in Mihăileni, Sibiu, Romania
- Metis Island in Antarctica

== Other uses ==
- 9 Metis, an asteroid
- 9K115 Metis, a Russian anti–tank missile system
- 9K115-2 Metis-M, a Russian anti–tank missile system
- Metis (American musician) (fl. 21st century), American rapper
- Metis (theorem prover)
- Metis (Japanese musician) (born 1984), reggae singer
- Metis (moon), of Jupiter
- Metis (mythology), an Oceanid and wife of Zeus
- Metis (software), business modeling
- METIS, graph partitioning software
- METIS, an instrument for the ~2029 Extremely Large Telescope
- Metis TransPacific Airlines, Vancouver, Canada
- Metis (holothurian), or Actinopyga, a genus of sea cucumbers
- Metis (character), in Persona 3 FES

== See also ==
- Metisse, windowing software
- Meti (disambiguation)
- Metius (disambiguation)
