= Diving, Safety, Security, Search and Rescue Team =

Branch of the Turkish Coast Guard

Diving, Safety, Security and Search and Rescue (Turkish: Dalış Emniyet Güvenlik ve Arama Kurtarma Timleri DEGAK) teams perform underwater missions especially search and rescue operations. They reach depths of up to 130 feet (40 m) underwater. It is a service branch of the Coast Guard Command.

Diving, Safety, Security, Search and Rescue Team is organized into four area commands: the Black Sea, the Sea of Marmara, the Aegean Sea, and the Mediterranean Sea.

== Vessel specifications ==
The team uses inflatable dinghies to access dive sites:

- Dimensions (Length-Width-Draft): 5.8 M - 2.2 M - 0.75 M
- Vessel: Rubber Inflatable Boat
- Engine Power: 50 HP x2
- Maximum Speed: 30 KTS

== See also ==
- Coast Guard Command (Turkey)
- Maritime Search and Security Operations Team (Turkey)
- Turkish Navy
- Underwater Offence (Turkish Armed Forces)
- Underwater Defence (Turkish Armed Forces)
