= Belgian apologies to the Congo =

Apologies to the Congo expressed by Belgium

Belgian apologies to the Congo are the subject of a societal debate in Belgium over the expression of apologies for the role that country has played in the atrocities that have been committed in the Congo Free State (or the Independent State of Congo) and the Belgian Congo between 1885 and 1960, and the colony of Ruanda-Urundi (1924–1962).

In the 21st century, several Belgian government agencies and representatives have apologised for various aspects of the Belgian colonial rule in the Congo, Rwanda and Burundi, especially since 2018. Discussions continue on what kind of apologies for which matters would be appropriate and who should express them, or in which cases it would not be necessary. In addition, it is discussed how to best deal with the colonial material and intangible heritage, including statues, street names, and the organisation of museums.

== Political debate ==
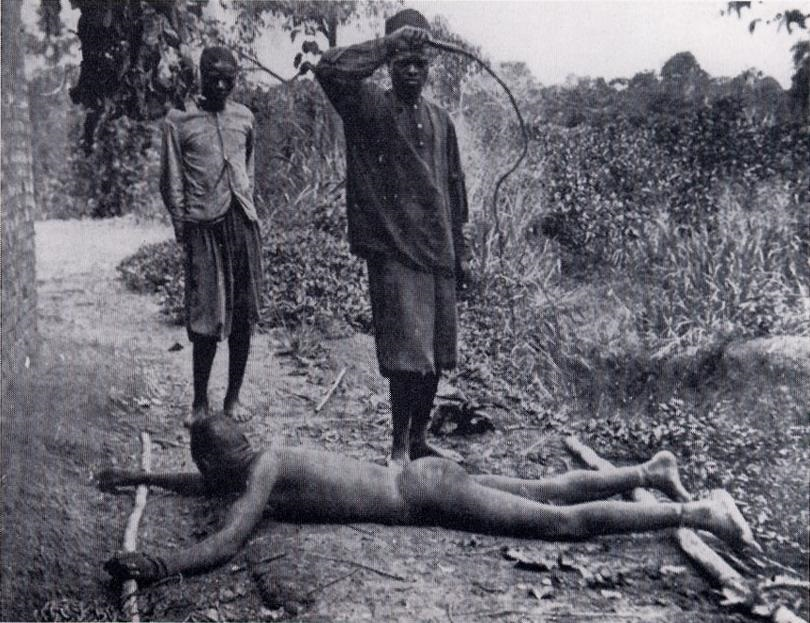
Mistreatment of a Congolese man.

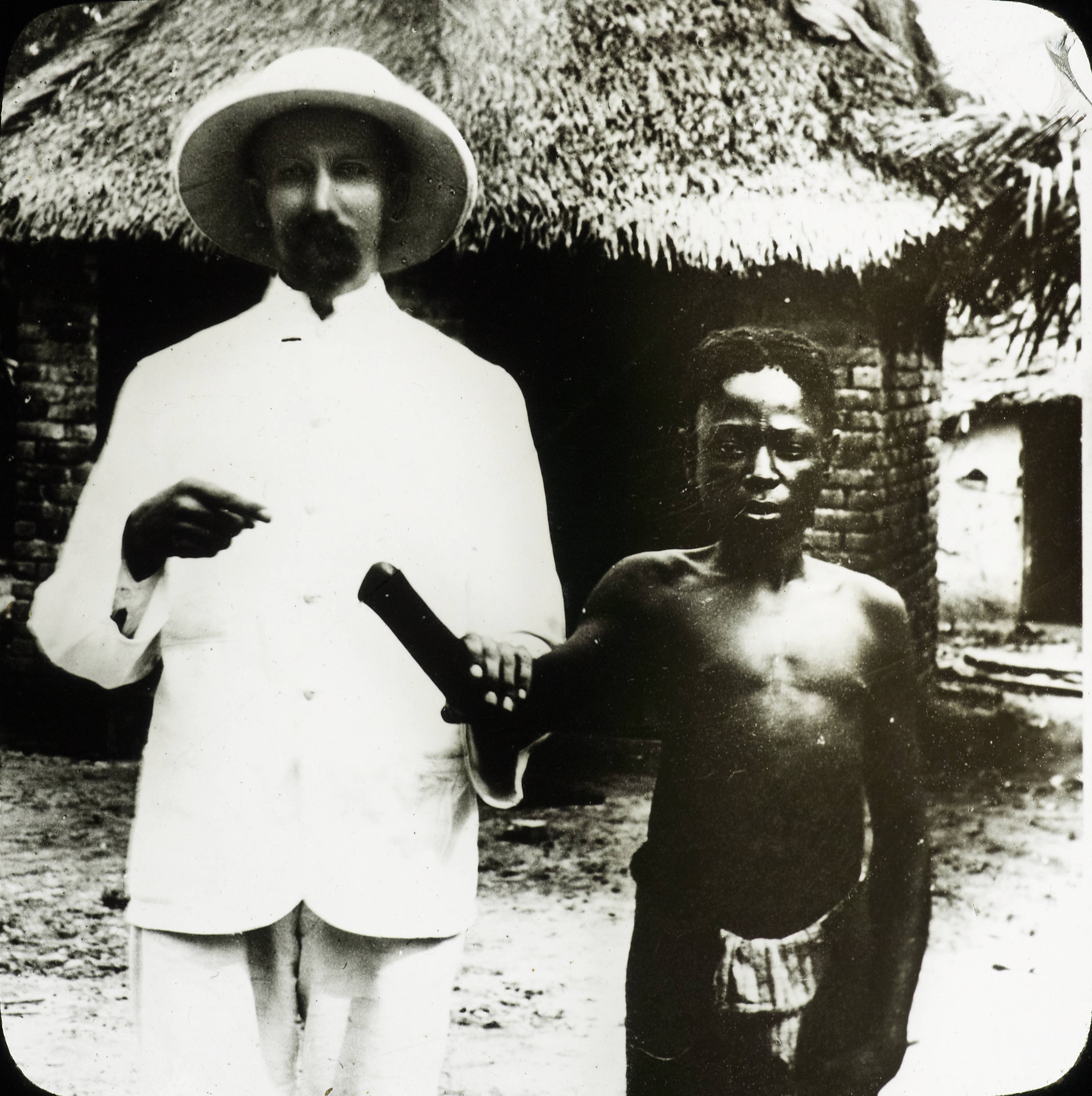
Example of the notorious hand-cutting in the Congo Free State.

In Belgian public discourse, King Leopold II of Belgium (r. 1865–1909), who ruled the Congo Free State as his private property from 1885 to 1908, is generally held to bear the primary responsibility for the atrocities committed there in that colonial period. In the early 21st century, statues of Leopold II have been regularly defaced or vandalised for this reason. For example, the statue of Leopold on the Throne Square in Brussels has been stained several times with paint.

=== 2018 ===
In June 2018, after years of discussions, for the first time in Belgium a square was named after Patrice Lumumba, who is commonly regarded as the achiever of the Congolese independence (30 June 1960), but was assassinated in January 1961 on the orders of the Belgian government. Activists had originally advocated for naming a larger nameless square after Lumumba in the neighbouring municipality of Ixelles/Elsene, but in 2016 mayor Dominique Dufourny (MR) categorically rejected that proposal.

In August 2018, an incident occurred at the Pukkelpop festival, where some participants sang racist colonial chants. Politicians condemned the incident. The federal prosecutor's office ordered the singers to visit the Kazerne Dossin Memorial, Museum and Documentation Centre on Holocaust and Human Rights at the Mechelen transit camp for mandatory education.

After the Belgian local elections of 14 October 2018, Pierre Kompany (cdH) became the first black mayor in Belgium, namely in the Brussels municipality of Ganshoren. In the television debate programme C’est pas tous les jours dimanche on RTL-TVI, Kompany (who was born in the Belgian Congo) called on politicians to express apologies to the Congolese in the name of Belgium. In the same show, Representative Richard Miller (MR) said he favoured expressing apologies "in [one's] own name".

From November 2018 to January 2019, Canvas broadcast the documentary series Kinderen van de kolonie (Children of the Colony), which aroused a public debate even before the first episode had aired. According to experts, this was the first documentary in which the Belgian population was presented with images and video footage from the Congo 'without solely looking through the lens of colonial propaganda'.

=== 2019 ===
After the United Nations experts commission "Experts on People of African Descent" published a report on 12 February 2019 which indicated that apologies for the colonial past would be fitting, several politicians showed a willingness to engage in debates about the issue.

Prime minister Charles Michel (MR) said he found the report "very strange". Back in 2010, his father Louis Michel had still characterised Leopold II as "a hero with ambition for a small country like Belgium". Similarly, Minister of Development Cooperation Alexander De Croo (Open Vld) found the experts' criticism of the renovated AfricaMuseum "quite strange".

Member of the Flemish Parliament Sabine de Bethune (CD&V), herself born in Kinshasa (then Léopoldville/Leopoldstad) in the Belgian Congo, introduced a resolution on 19 February to launch a historical investigation into the atrocities of the Belgian coloniser in the Congo after the Belgian federal election of 26 May 2019. Opposition parties Groen, Ecolo and sp.a had been urging for such an investigation for some time already. Government party Open Vld stated it would like to consider apologies after the 26 May 2019 elections. In the Eén debate programme De Zevende Dag, N-VA leader Bart De Wever argued in favour of a "historic pardon", indicating that one should "look to the head of state" to express it, because of the link between the Congo and Leopold II.

Congolese Catholic bishop Laurent Monsengwo Pasinya stated in a March 2019 interview of Terzake that there are "more important issues" in the present-day Congo than colonial apologies, "such as the development of the country", he said. He expressed concerns that, should colonial apologies be expressed, "other dossiers will be opened", and people would go "too far".

In April 2019, an opinion poll amongst the inhabitants of Flanders on possible apologies to the Congo was held. This was done on the occasion of a poll of the VRT, RTBF, De Standaard and La Libre Belgique towards people's voting intentions on the 26 May 2019 election. Participants were asked to comment on the following statement: "Belgium should officially apologise to the Congo for crimes committed in the colonial period." 51% of respondents agreed, 32% disagreed.

=== 2020 ===
After the George Floyd protests in May 2020, the debate on racism and discrimination was reignited in Belgium, and the question of possible apologies to the Congo resurfaced. Again several statues of Leopold II were vandalised, and the Statue of Leopold II of Belgium, Ekeren was damaged so severely that it was removed. In June 2020, this renewed attention led Chamber President Patrick Dewael to suggest the creation of a "reconciliation commission" in the Chamber of Representatives, which would inquire on how to best deal with the colonial past, and potential apologies to the Congo. Simultaneously, party leaders such as Joachim Coens (CD&V) and Conner Rousseau (sp.a) spoke in favour of apologies, with Coens expressly referring to King Philippe of Belgium and the federal government for this task.

=== 2024 ===
In December 2024, the Brussels Court of Appeal found Belgium responsible for crimes against humanity due to its treatment of Métis (mixed-race) children, ordering compensation for five Métis women who had sued the state. In May 2026, the Court of Cassation upheld the decision, making the verdict final.

== Accomplished initiatives ==
=== Apologies to Lumumba family ===
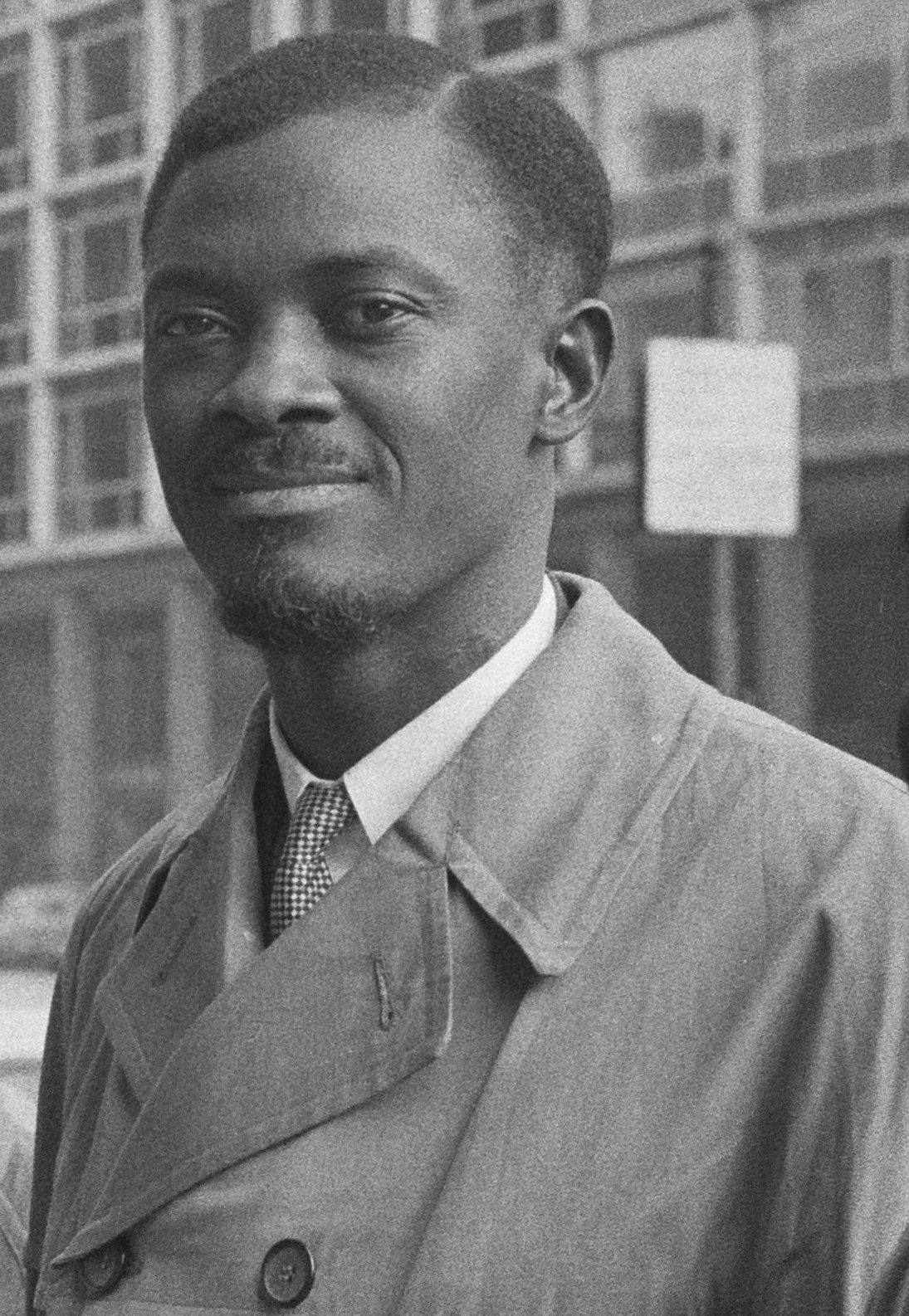
Patrice Lumumba in Brussels in 1960.

In the early 2000s, a Belgian parliamentary commission conducted an investigation into the precise circumstances of the 1961 assassination of Patrice Lumumba, the first prime minister of the Republic of the Congo, and to assess whether any Belgian politicians were involved. On 16 November 2001, the commission published its report. Amongst other things, the report concluded that, although there was no evidence of the direct involvement of the Belgian government, it did carry a "moral responsibility" for the circumstances surrounding the assassination of Lumumba. Commission president Geert Versnick urged the government to express apologies to the relatives of Lumumba, and the parties Agalev and Ecolo also urged compensations for the benefit of the Congolese population. In 2002, prime minister Guy Verhofstadt (VLD) apologised on behalf of Belgium for the Belgian involvement in the 1961 murder of Patrice Lumumba. Minister of Foreign Affairs Louis Michel (MR) read a statement in the Chamber of Representatives on 5 February 2002, in which he apologised on behalf of the Belgian government to the Lumumba, Mpolo, and Okito families, and the Congolese population. Although Michel did not speak of "moral responsibility", he added that some members of the government and other Belgians were clearly responsible for the events that eventually led to the death of Lumumba.

=== Patrice Lumumba Square ===
On 30 June 2018, Brussels mayor Philippe Close (PS) ceremonially opened the Patrice Lumumba Square in the City of Brussels after the city council had unanimously approved the renaming on 23 April 2018.

The desire for streets named after Lumumba also existed elsewhere in the country. The city government of Ghent stated in January 2019 that it wanted to honour Lumumba with a street or square name as well. Previously, activists had already unofficially renamed the Leopold II Lane to 'Patrice Lumumba Lane'. In January 2021, the Ghent government announced that the Leopold II Lane would be renamed within a year, and that Patrice Lumumba was put at the top of names for a new street or square in Ghent, although it was yet unknown whether the Leopold II Lane would be renamed after Patrice Lumumba. Residents would be financially compensated for the address change.

=== AfricaMuseum ===
A December 2018 planned visit of King Philippe of Belgium to the recently renovated Africamuseum was cancelled, according to journalists because the debate was still in full swing, and King Philip wished to remain neutral in discussions.

The Africamuseum was founded at the start of the 20th century as Royal Museum for Central Africa by Philip's ancestor, King Leopold II of Belgium, then the absolute ruler and private owner of the Congo Free State, where a colonial reign of terror was conducted. The museum sprang from the temporary colonial exposition as part of the Brussels International Exposition (1897). Due to the exposition's popularity, it was made permanent a few years later: in 1904, construction began on a stone museum (with some departments dedicated to scientific research inside and about Africa), which was completed in 1910. In the earliest stage of the permanent exposition, there was a section (disapprovingly called a "human zoo" by later commentators) for which Leopold II moved 200 Congolese people to Belgium in order to show visitors what daily life was like in the Belgian colonies. This project got out of hand, and seven of the Congolese died; since the reopening of the AfricaMuseum in December 2018, these 7 Congolese are commemorated on an information sign.

=== Apologies for the mixed-race children ===
From 1959 to 1962, around the time when the Belgian Congo and Ruanda-Urundi became independent, about 1,000 "mixed-race children" (French: enfants métis; Dutch: metis(sen)kinderen) from Belgian colonist fathers and native Congolese mothers were kidnapped to Belgium, away from their mothers and siblings. Most fathers refused to recognise their paternity, and hundreds of children ended up with statelessness and were put in Catholic orphanages and boarding schools. 59 years after Congolese independence, prime minister Charles Michel (MR) expressed apologies to the hundreds of mixed-race children on behalf of Belgium on 3 April 2019 in the Chamber of Representatives.

Before the Michel's apologies, Chamber president Siegfried Bracke (N-VA) held a speech in which he sketched the historical background of the story of the mixed-race children, and explained that these apologies were the result of several earlier parlementary resolutions in inter alia the Flemish Parliament, the Senate, and the Chamber of Representatives. Next, prime minister Charles Michel made his statement. Inside the Parliament building, his apologies were received with applause, both from the Representatives and from citizens in the audience, including many mixed-race children. After this, the plenary session was temporarily suspended, and in a commission room of the Chamber a meeting took place between the prime minister and Chamber president on the one hand, and mixed-race children and Congo experts (including former VRT journalists William Van Laeken and Walter Zinzen) on the other hand.

These apologies were also widely covered in the foreign press, including the BBC, The Guardian, The Irish Times, CNN, The New York Times, Le Figaro, the NOS, and NRC Handelsblad.

=== Regrets from the King to the Congolese president ===
On 30 June 2020, on the occasion of the 60th anniversary of the independence of the Democratic Republic of the Congo, King Philippe of Belgium wrote a historic letter to the Congolese president Félix Tshisekedi. In this letter the King stated: "This history consists of shared achievements, but also painful episodes. During the Congo Free State, violent and cruel acts were committed which continue to weigh down on our collective memory. During the subsequent colonial period, suffering was caused and humiliations were inflicted as well. I would like to express my deepest regret for those wounds of the past." It was the first time that a Belgian king publicly spoke against the atrocities in the Congo. This letter followed a few days after previous calls made by Joachim Coens (CD&V) and others to the King to apologise to the Congo. However, King Philip did not explicitly mention the role of King Leopold II in the atrocities, and some activists accused him of not making a full apology.

== See also ==
- Atrocities in the Congo Free State
- Belgian Congo
- Congo Free State
- Genocide recognition politics
- Leopold II of Belgium
- Street name controversy
