= METI =

METI or Meti or variant, may refer to:

- Meti (Gambela), Ethiopia, the town in southwestern Ethiopia
- Meti (Oromia), Ethiopia, the town in west-central Ethiopia, see Ambo Zuria
- Meti (gender), a third gender in Nepal
- Ministry of Economy, Trade and Industry, Japan
- Messaging to Extra-Terrestrial Intelligence (METI or Active SETI), the sending of interstellar messages
  - METI (Messaging Extraterrestrial Intelligence), a non-profit organization for sending interstellar messages
- The METI Handmade School in Bangladesh.
- The Middle Eastern Texts Initiative at Brigham Young University's Neal A. Maxwell Institute for Religious Scholarship.
- METİ (EOD vehicle), explosive ordinance disposal vehicle of the Turkish Army

== See also ==
- Metis (disambiguation)
