= Gendarmerie and Coast Guard Academy =

Turkish military higher education institution

- T.C. İçişleri Bakanlığı Jandarma ve Sahil Güvenlik Akademisi Başkanlığı
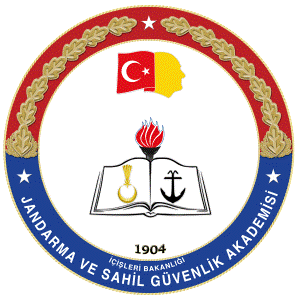
- Arms of the academy
- Type: Military school
- Established: 31 July 2016
- Director: Brigadier General Murat Bulut
- Location: Ankara, Turkey
- Website: en.jsga.edu.tr

The Gendarmerie and Coast Guard Academy (Turkish: Jandarma ve Sahil Güvenlik Akademisi) is a military higher education institution affiliated with the Ministry of Interior in Turkey. Its purpose is to meet the officer, non-commissioned officer, and other personnel needs of the Gendarmerie and Coast Guard organizations, as well as to provide associate, undergraduate, and postgraduate education, conduct scientific research, and publish academic works. The academy consists of faculties, institutes, vocational schools for non-commissioned officers, education and research centers, and training courses. The academy that is located in Ankara, Turkey is directed by Brigadier General Murat Bulut since 2020.

The academy comprises various educational and training bodies, including an Education Center, Institutes, Faculties, Vocational Schools, Research and Training Centers, as well as units providing administrative and service support to these bodies in their educational activities.

The duties of the units affiliated with the Academy and the Presidency are specified in the Gendarmerie and Coast Guard Academy Organization, Duties and Working Principles Regulation, and training activities commenced in September 2016.
