= BMC Kirpi =

Kirpi
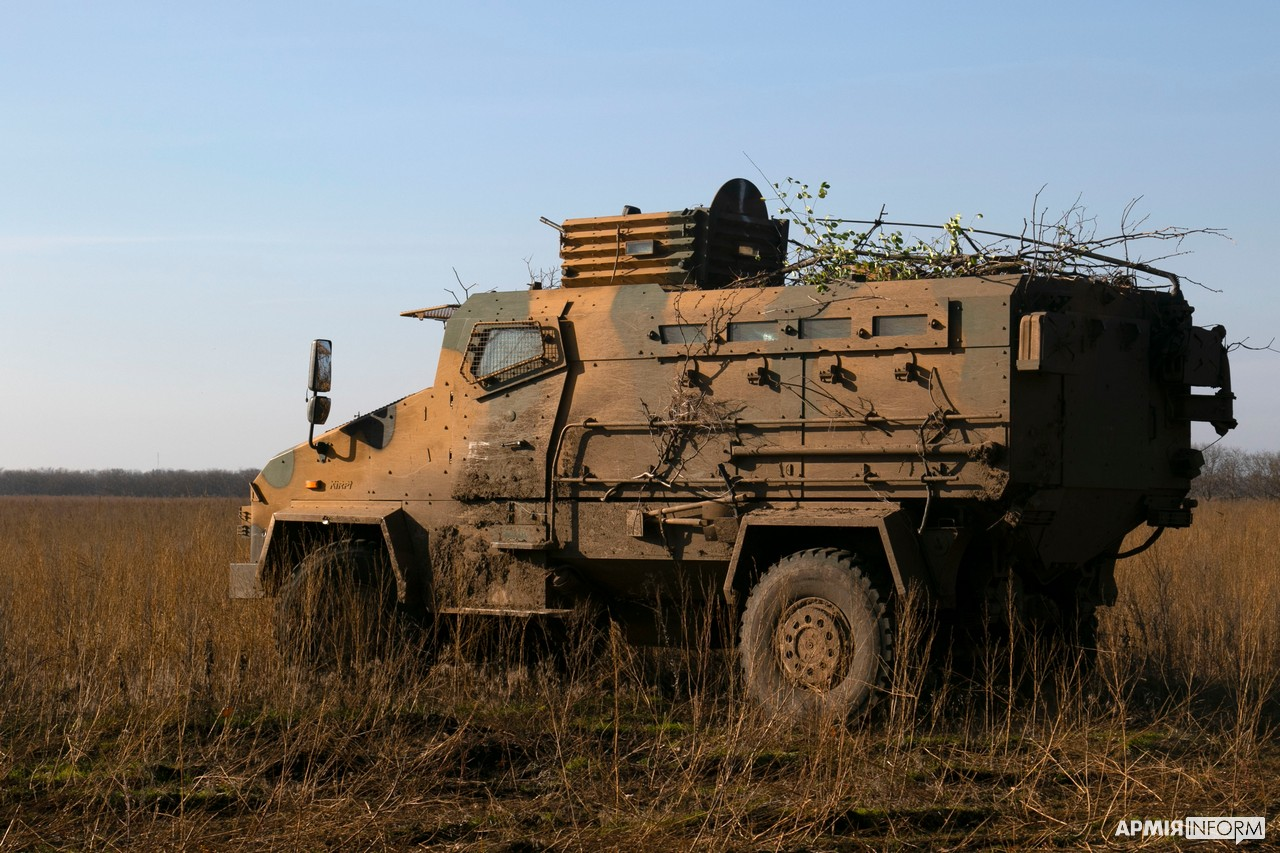
- BMC Kirpi in service with the Ukrainian 35th Marine Brigade
- Type: Mine-Resistant Ambush Protected Vehicle
- Place of origin: Turkey

Service history
- In service: Active (in service)
- Used by: See Operators
- Wars: Kurdish–Turkish conflict; Syrian Civil War; 2012 Syrian-Turkish border clashes; Turkey-ISIL conflict; 2019 Turkish offensive into north-eastern Syria; Second Libyan Civil War; Russian invasion of Ukraine

Production history
- Designer: BMC
- Designed: 2009 (first prototype)
- Manufacturer: BMC
- Variants: 4×4 and 6×6

Specifications
- Mass: 20,000 kg
- Length: 6.0 m (short version; 4×4) and 7.075 m (long version; 4×4)
- Width: 2.51 m (4×4)
- Height: 3.2 m
- Crew: 13 passengers
- Armor: STANAG 4569 Level 3 (MRAP) a
- Main armament: 7.62 or 12.7 mm machine guns
- Engine: BMC TUNA; 400 hp 350 ps (257 kW) 2100 rpm turbo diesel
- Transmission: Allison 3000 type 3000SP
- Suspension: Leaf spring
- Ground clearance: 345 mm
- Fuel capacity: 310 liter
- Operational range: 1000 km at 60 km/h

BMC Kirpi (Turkish for "Hedgehog") is a Turkish mine-resistant ambush protected (MRAP) vehicle manufactured by BMC.

== Development ==
The Kirpi design process started in 2008. The first prototype was produced in 2009. In 2009, BMC was awarded a tender for 614 MRAP vehicles by the SSB – Presidency of Defence Industry. During the preliminary and critical design phases of this 614 Kirpi project, the prototype was further developed and became the Kirpi 1.

Turkish Land Forces have used the Kirpi 1 intensively on its operations. After Kirpis started to be operated, Turkish Land Forces’ casualties started to reduce significantly. After this initial success of the Kirpi, its total sales number increased to more than 1,500, with more than 200 for export customers.

After the Kirpi 1's seven years of service, with the gained experience and feedback received from users, the Kirpi 2 was introduced in 2018, with several improvements upon the Kirpi 1. In 2018, BMC was awarded another contract by the SSB for 529 units of Kirpi 2 MRAP vehicles. Independent suspension for more comfortable journey for the troops inside, improved air conditioning and engine cooling pack integration, composite add-on armor to lighten the vehicle, allowing it to carry more payload and more mission equipment. Particle/shrapnel holder, spall-liner installation upgrades have been applied to newer, second generation Kirpi 2.

== Technical description ==
BMC Kirpi has a monocoque V-shaped body. Recovery and/or towing points are fitted front and rear, a NATO standard pintle being fitted at the rear. A front-mounted hydraulically operated self-recovery winch is standard.

V-shape monocoque body with composed add-on armor offers great resistance against mine and ballistic attacks in terms of NATO Stanag 4569. Protection levels are classified. In second generation of Kirpi, the Kirpi 2 has composite add-on armor and further increased mine protection.

The cabin can carry 13 personnel, driver, commander and gunner facing front, the rest of 10 personnel are facing each other with 5 units on one side and 5 more on the opposite side both sat on the edge of side walls. Each personnel has mine protected seating, gun racks and gun ports to counterfire in times of need. There are two roof hatches, one on front, opens up inside the covered manual turret, optionally manual turret can be replaced with automatic weapon station, in this situation, front roof hatch opens up behind the weapon station, allowing to manually operate or reload. Second roof hatch is at the far end of cabin. There is a hydraulic operated door at the back of the vehicle, 10 personnel can mount up or evacuate from this door.

The BMC Kirpi 4×4 is 18 tons when empty and has 2,000 kg payload with a gross vehicle weight of 20,000 kg.

Motive power for the BMC Kirpi is provided by a EURO 3 emissions compliant Cummins diesel engine developing 375 hp (275 kW). An engine cold start kit is fitted and the cooling system has been adapted for tactical applications in between −32 °C / +55 °C temperatures. The BMC TUNA engine is planned to replace the currently used Cummins engine. In January 2025, TUNA engine Replaces Cummins engine.

Driveline is completed by an Allison 3000 six-speed fully automatic transmission coupled to an Axletech two-speed transfer box with selectable 4×2 or 4×4 drive. A longitudinal driver-controlled pneumatically operated differential lock is fitted. Both the front steer-drive axle and the rear drive axles are Axletech rated at 9,500 kg capacity and sprung by the combination of parabolic leaf springs, telescopic shock absorbers, and an anti-roll bar. In second generation of Kirpi, the Kirpi 2 has fully independent suspension with coil springs, has same axle capacity. Both are fitted with driver-controlled pneumatically operated cross-axle differential locks. Steering is power assisted.

Single 14.00 R 20 tyres are standard, rims are 10x20”. CTIS is fitted. Disc brakes are fitted front and rear, supplemented by an engine exhaust brake. ABS is also standard.

Automatic fire suppression system inside personnel cabin an engine departments are standard while outside and tire suppression systems are optional.

== Variants ==
BMC Kirpi is a troop carrier and mainly used to transport troops one place to another safely. It is also a multi-purpose platform that can be adapted for the desired role, needed by the end user. It can be utilized to serve different tactical purposes according to certain requirements. BMC Kirpi has 4×4 and 6×6 configurations. The vehicle is driven from all its available wheels which makes it suitable to perform its duty on any terrain.

4×4 Troop Carrier

Standard troop carrier version is used to transport 13 personnel from one place to another with high safety, ignoring the climate and terrain hardships.

6×6 Troop Carrier

6×6 version of standard troop carrier. Can carry 15 personnel.

Combat Tactical Vehicle

When a standard troop carrier version is equipped with situational awareness & offensive weapon systems makes Kirpi a combat fighting vehicle.

Utility Vehicle

Standard troop carrier version can be turned into a utility vehicle in order to carry cargo safely.

Ambulance

Ambulance version takes wounded soldiers from the heat of battle and safely escorts them to the back of frontlines. Can carry two doctors with two inpatients or two doctors with one inpatient and two walking cases.

Mine Detection and Disposal Vehicle

Leads any military convoy, detects explosives buried underground, disrupts it with its robotic arm and disposes any mine threat.

== Characteristics ==
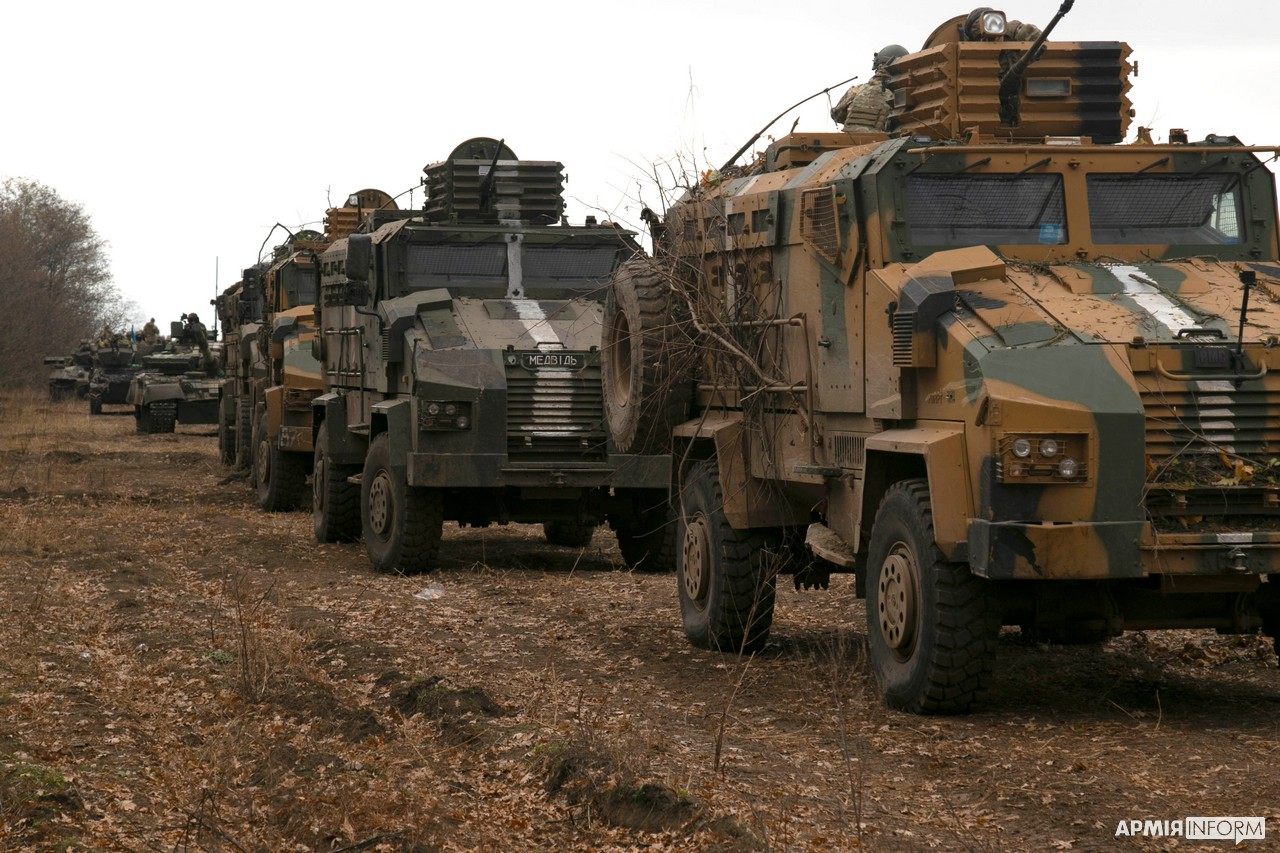
UA Marines BMC Kirpi.

The design contract was awarded in 2009, and deliveries commenced in 2014.

Its armored hull provides protection against armor-piercing rounds and artillery shell splinters. Some vehicles have been fitted with cage armor for protection against RPG rounds.

The Kirpi features shock absorber seats and interior accessories, a GPS system, rear view camera, and automatic fire suppression system. It has five firing ports and four bulletproof windows on each side of the troop compartment.

It has a shielded position for the gunner on top of the roof, which can be operated manually and can rotate through 360 degrees. The vehicle can be armed with a 7.62-mm or 12.7-mm machine gun and is also available with remotely-controlled weapons stations.

== Operators ==
A map with BMC Kirpi operators in blue

- Bosnia and Herzegovina
  - Armed Forces of Bosnia and Herzegovina: in November 2024 Zukan Helez, the Minister of Defense of Bosnia and Herzegovina, announced that an agreement has been signed to procure BMC Kirpi MRAPs from Turkey.
- Djibouti
  - Djiboutian Army: BMC Kirpi I with Aselsan SARP DUAL remote controlled weapon station in use.
- United Arab Emirates
  - United Arab Emirates:
- Kosovo
  - Kosovo Security Force: Kosovo MoD confirmed the purchase of 14 BMC Kirpi 4×4 MRAP vehicles to local media and Turkish Anadolu Agency news agency, the deliveries are expected to begin in 2022.
- Libya
  - Libyan Army: 40+ BMC Kirpi 4×4 MRAP.
- Pakistan
  - Pakistan Army: 100+ BMC Kirpi 4×4.
- Qatar
  - Qatari Emiri Land Force: 50 on order
- Russia
  - Russian Ground Forces: 9 captured from Ukrainian forces.
- Somalia
  - Somali National Army: 12 BMC Kirpi 4×4 MRAP vehicles in service. Donated by Turkey.
- Tunisia
  - Tunisian Army: 233 in service.
- Turkey
  - Turkish Army: over 2,000 in service.
  - Turkish Air Force: 15 in service.
  - Gendarmerie General Command: 230 in service.
  - General Directorate of Security: 40 in service.
- Turkmenistan
  - Turkmenistan Army: 10 BMC Kirpi and 90 BMC Vuran in service.
- Ukraine
  - Ukrainian Navy: Marine detachment of the Ukrainian Naval Forces have received 50 Turkish BMC Kirpi 4×4 MRAP vehicles with 150 more expected to be delivered later. Another batch consisting of at least 42 additional vehicles was spotted getting transported to Ukraine in early 2023. According to Oryx, a defence analysis website that tracks inventories and equipment losses in conflict zones, as of 5 December 2025 in total 133 units were destroyed, damaged, abandoned or captured during the ongoing Russian invasion of Ukraine. Turkey claimed they issued total 700 BMC Kiripi to Ukraine.

=== Non-state operators ===
- Autonomous Administration of North and East Syria (AANES)
  - People's Defense Units (YPG): one captured from the Turkish Army in 2019, seen in use in 2022.
- Yemen
  - Southern Movement: some BMC Kirpi I MRAPs purchased by United Arab Emirates from Turkey were donated to secessionist Southern Transitional Council in Yemen to be operated by its paramilitary wing, the Southern Movement.
