= BMC Otomotiv =

Turkish vehicle manufacturer

BMC Otomotiv Sanayi ve Ticaret A.Ş.
- Industry: Automotive
- Predecessor: Askam Trucks (since 2015)
- Founded: 1964; 62 years ago
- Headquarters: İzmir, Pınarbaşı, Bornova, Turkey
- Area served: Europe, Middle East, Central Asia, Africa
- Products: Automobiles, automotives, trucks, buses and military vehicles
- Owner: Tosyalı Holding (51%); Qatar Armed Forces İndustry Committee (49%)
- Number of employees: 3500+
- Website: www.bmc.com.tr/

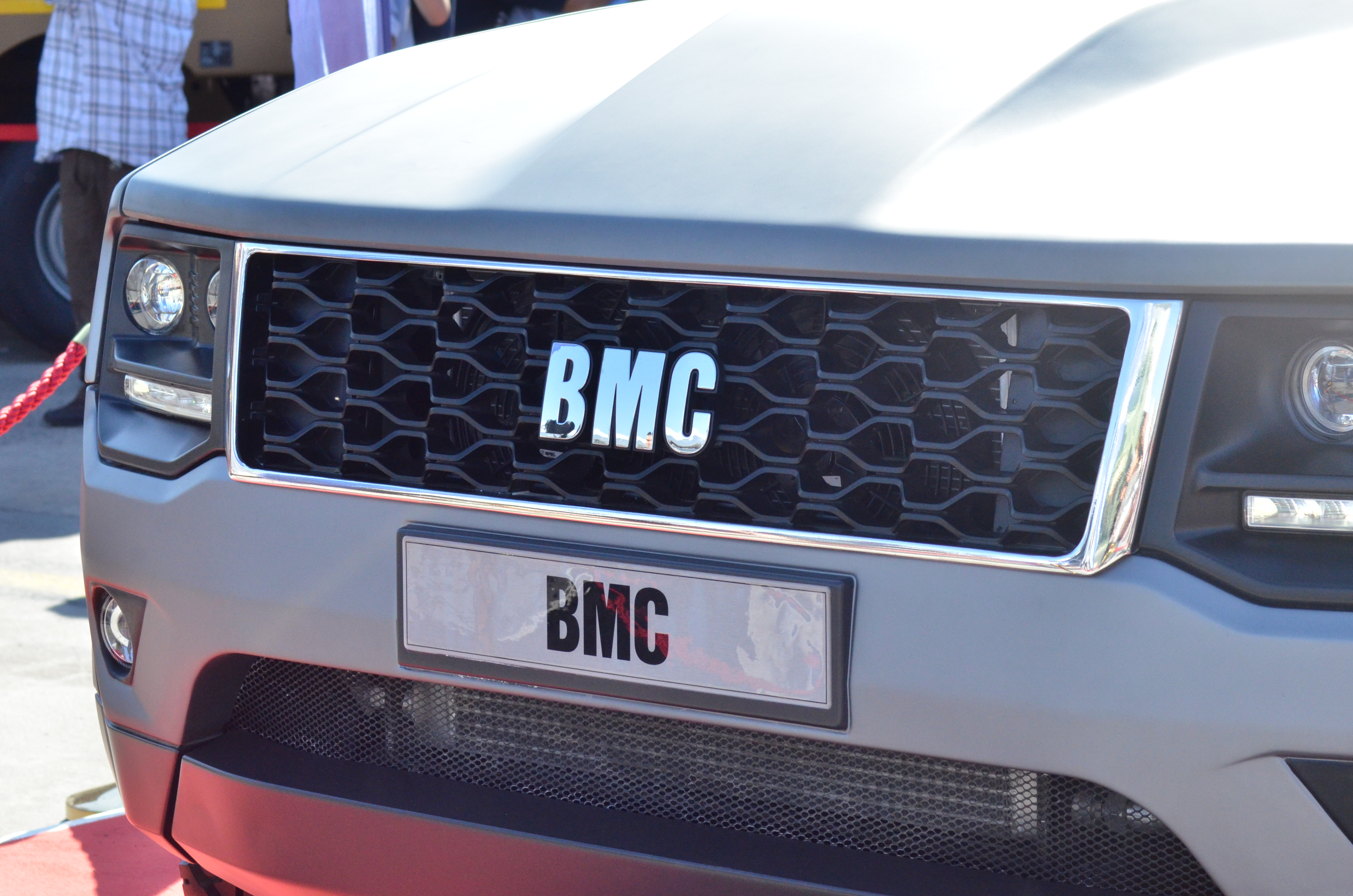
BMC Tulga Armored Pickup (4x4)

BMC Otomotiv Sanayi ve Ticaret A.Ş. (English: BMC Automotive Industry and Trade A.Ş.), doing business as BMC Otomotiv and BMC (Turkish pronunciation: [beː meː ˈdʒeː]), is one of the largest automobile manufacturers in Turkey. Its products include commercial trucks, buses, military trucks and armoured vehicles (including tanks). The company was founded in 1964 by Ergün Özakat in partnership of British Motor Corporation which held a 26% stake. It was purchased by Çukurova Holding in 1989, and seized by the Turkish government's TMSF (Turkish Savings Deposit Insurance Fund) in 2013. BMC has been taken over with a final bid of TL 751M, by a partnership of 51% Turkish side (Ethem Sancak and Talip Öztürk) and 49% Qatari side (QAFIC – Qatar Armed Forces Industry Committee).

== History ==
=== Partnership with British Motor Corporation ===
Exports of Austin trucks from the UK to Turkey began in 1947. Austin merged with Morris Motors in 1952 to form the British Motor Corporation, or BMC for short. BMC Turkey was formed in 1964 in İzmir by Ergün Özakat in partnership with the British Motor Corporation. The UK-based company held 26% of the capital, with the remainder belonging to the Turkish partners. Both Austin and Morris vehicles were manufactured at BMC Turkey under licence during its early years.

1966 was the first year BMC started adding trucks, tractors and engine production in its product line. Turkish-made Leyland 6/98 diesel engines of 120 hp (89 kW) were used across the line by the late 1970s.

=== Other partnerships ===
In later years, BMC evolved and developed other models with partnerships with other firms and the successors of the British Motor Corporation (which became British Leyland).

First, the Leyland TM 30 (later renamed Levend), based on the Leyland Sherpa, was released into the market as the first full-size van in 1980. It used the 1.8 litre BMC I4 diesel engine and the 5-speed BMC 15 manual gearbox.

In 1983, under a partnership with Volvo Trucks, BMC produced the Yavuz series trucks. These were followed by the Fatih series of trucks which offered Cummins diesel engines. Both the Yavuz and the Fatih used Leyland's old G-series cab, also referred to as the "Redline" or the "Bathgate" cab (after the plant where it was originally built).

=== TMSF (2013–2014) ===
TMSF has taken over the company in 2013, produced Kirpi MRAPs and completed the deliveries. After the Kirpi deliveries are completed, then TMSF put the company out to tender, which has been won by Es Mali Yatırım.

=== Present-day (2014–) ===
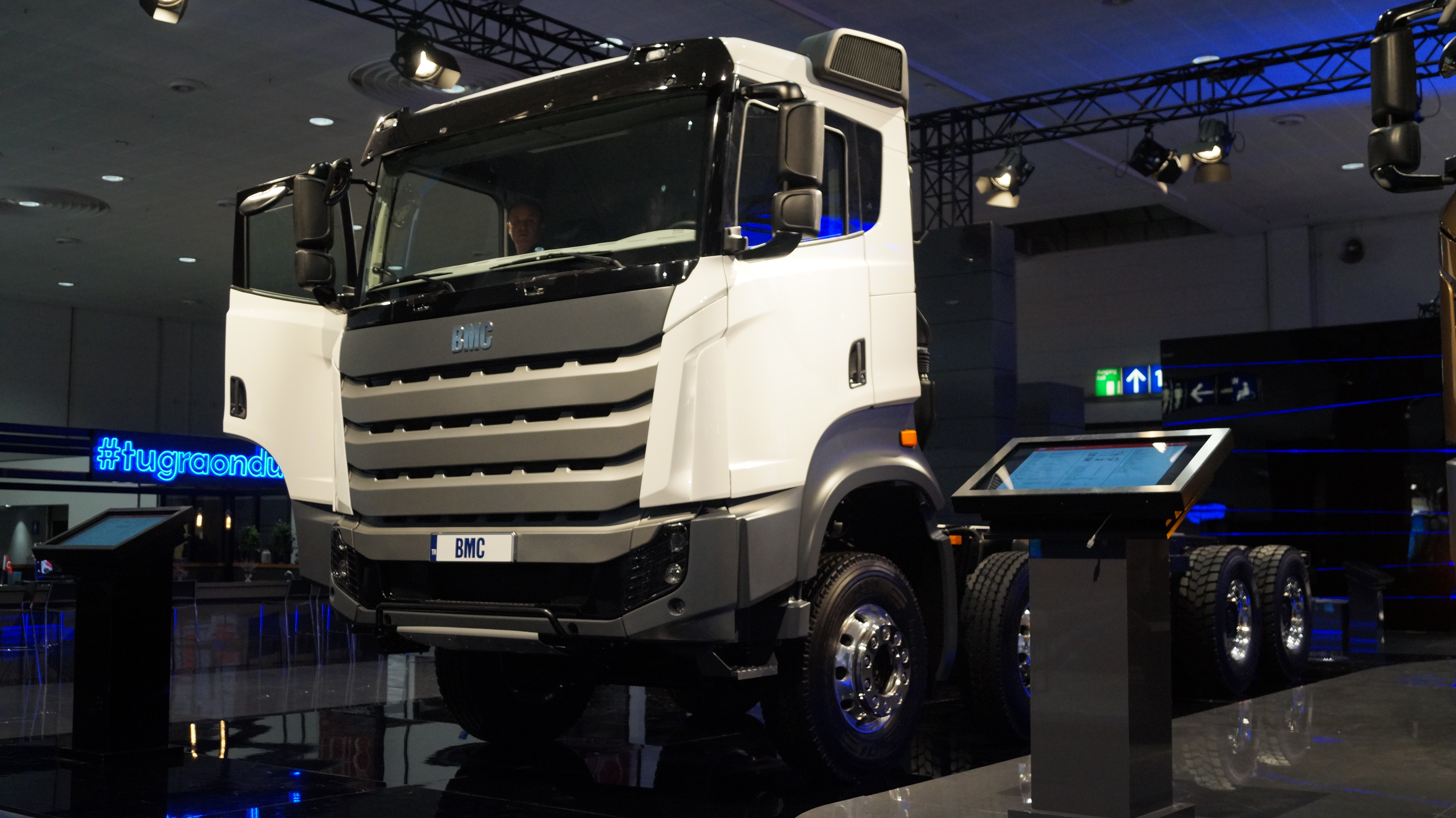
BMC Tuğra 8x4 truck

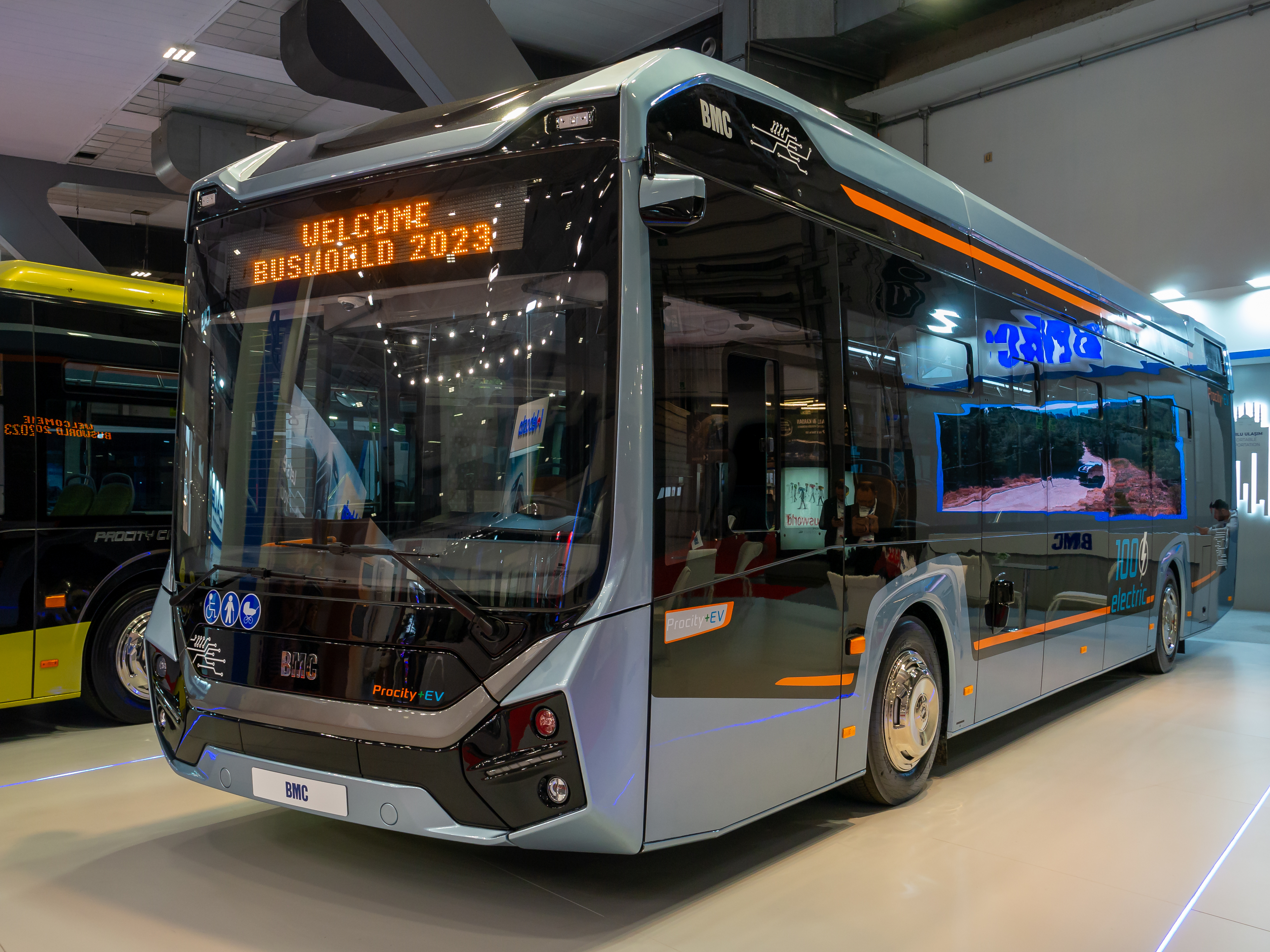
BMC Procity EV bus

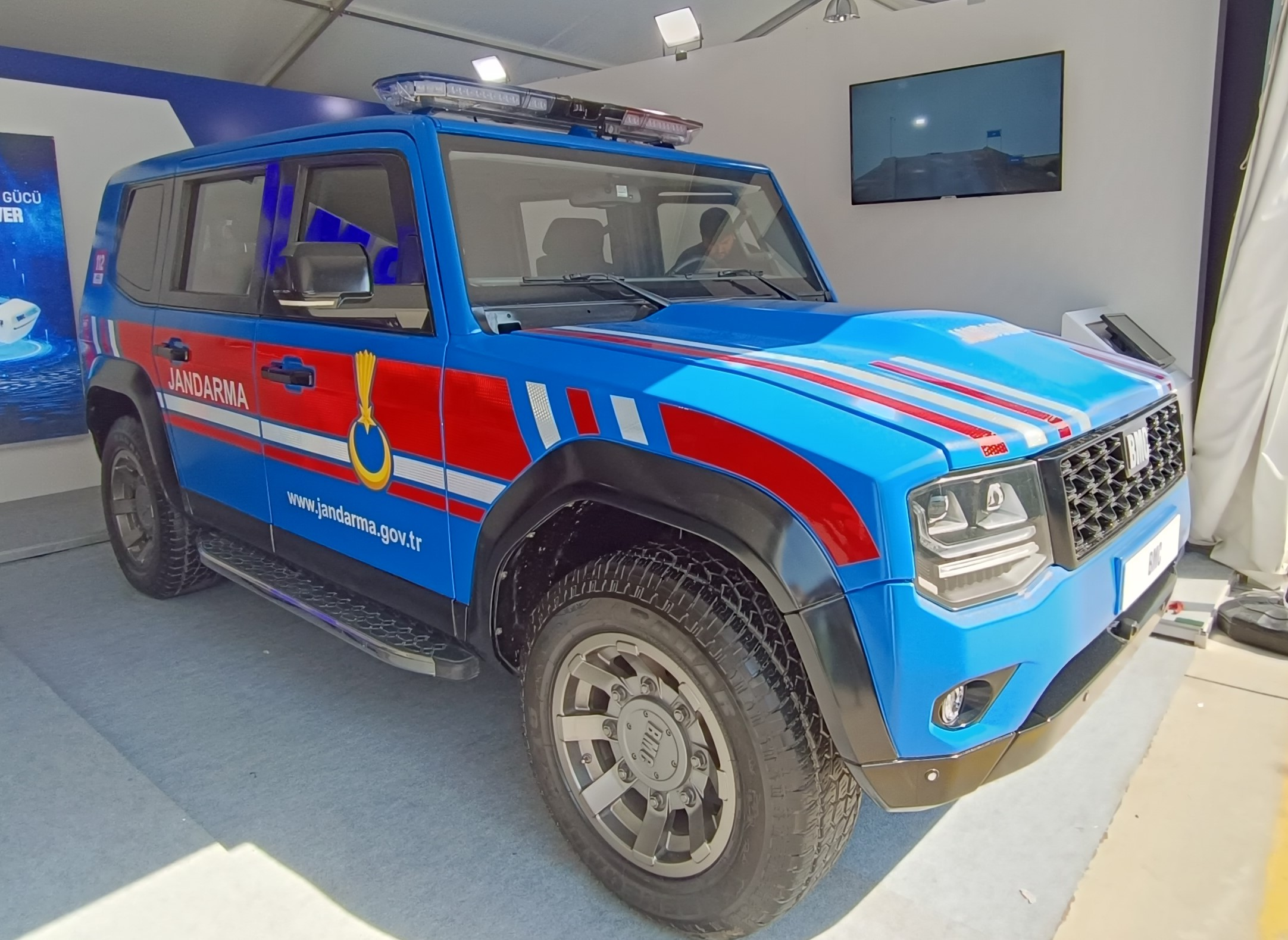
BMC Tulga 4x4 SUV

Currently, BMC is actively designing, developing and realizing mass production of its products. Its research and development activities are being carried out independently.

2800+ staff are working for BMC while 500+ of them are engineers. Today BMC are about to start the mass production of 250 units of Altay Turkish Main Battle Tank, designing indigenous engines for tanks and armoured vehicles, and 8x8 Armoured Personnel Carriers. BMC has also a partnership of design and mass production of domestic passenger car. BMC is also active in rail systems. BMC produces 6x6 & 4x4 Kirpi MRAP vehicles.

In 2018 2nd generation of Kirpi, the Kirpi-2 is introduced. Lightly armored than Kirpi, Amazon is introduced in 2015. BMC produces military trucks; beginning from 8x8 tank transporter, 6x6 10 tonners, 4x4 5 tonners up to 2,5 tonners. These utility trucks can be equipped with any superstructure (water/fuel tanker, command control/shelter, rocket launcher, mobile repair/maintenance, recovery crane, etc.) and gain required role. Other specialized military vehicles are also being produced like Riot Control Vehicles or Hidden Armored Buses (looks like a soft skin commercial bus from the outside).

Other than a wide variety of military vehicles, BMC has also different commercial vehicles as well. Buses starting from 8,5m, 9m, 10m, 12m, up to 18m articulated buses and 14m airport apron buses is on mass production with three engine selections: diesel, CNG, and electric.

Commercial trucks having engines with Euro6 engine emission levels with different models are also on product range. Tractors, construction and haulage trucks with many different engine, transmission and cabin selection are presented to market.

BMC has produced 400,000+ vehicles, while exporting its commercial to 80 countries including The United Kingdom, Spain, Italy and Russia and its military vehicles to 17 countries.

== BMC vehicles ==
=== Military vehicles ===
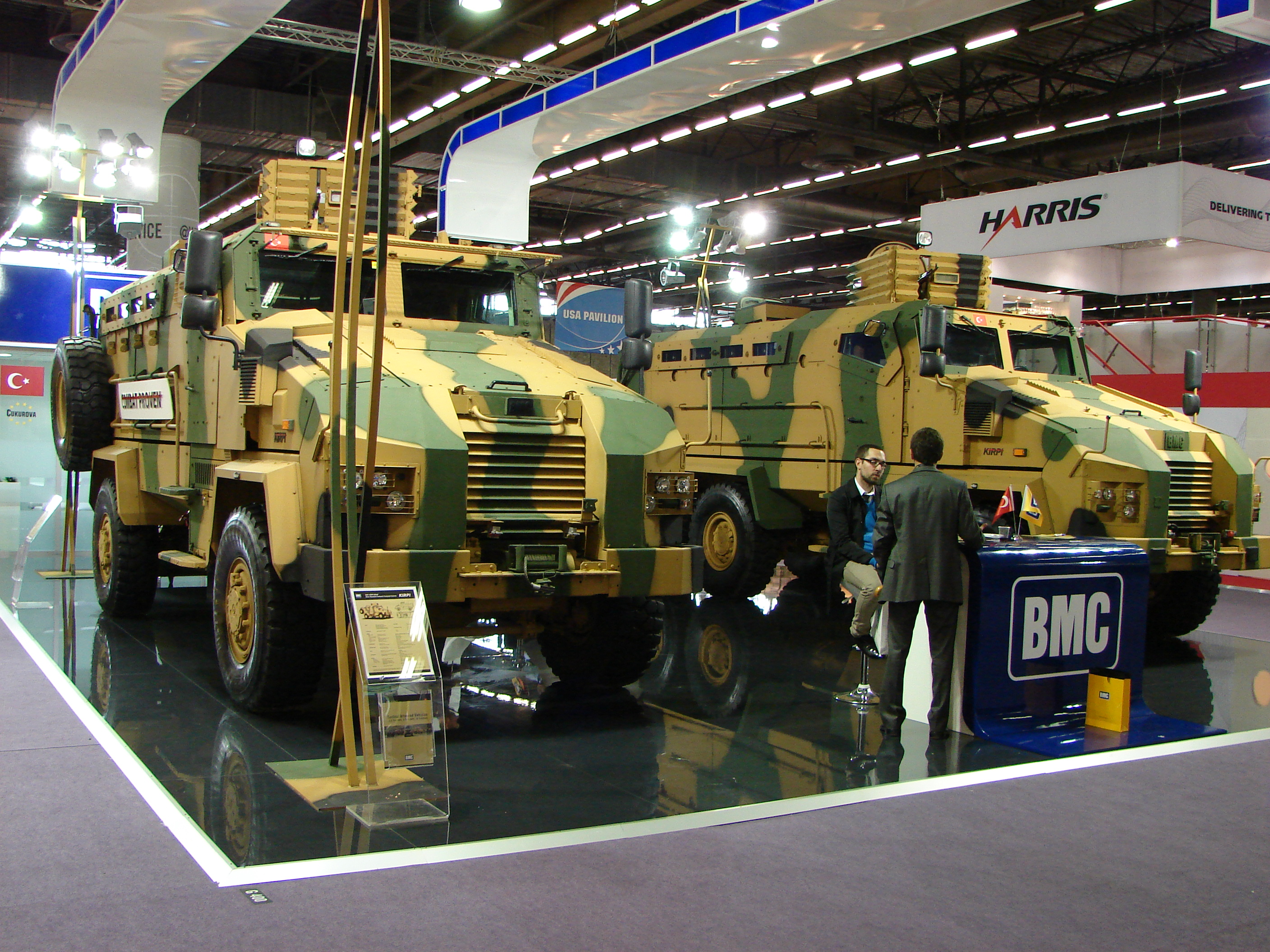
BMC Kirpi MRAP

BMC designs, develops and produces various military vehicles. Other than its standard products, BMC has the capability of designing vehicles according to end user requirements.

==== Armoured vehicles ====
- Altay MBT
- Kirpi MRAP
- Vuran IMV
- Amazon MRAP
- METİ (EOD vehicle)
- Turan 4x4 Armored Cargo and Personnel Carrier
- Tulga 4x4 Pickup / SUV
- Altuğ 8x8 IFV/APC

==== Tactical wheeled vehicles ====
- 8x8 Tank transporter
- 6x6 10 tonner
- 4x4 5 tonner
- 4x4 2,5 tonner

==== Logistic support vehicles ====
- Water tanker
- Fuel tanker
- Armored fuel tanker Aktan
- Recovery vehicle
- Container carrier
- Rocket launcher
- Repair/Maintenance vehicle
- BMC Tugra
- BMC Pamir

==== Security vehicles ====
- Hidden armored bus
- Riot control vehicle

=== Commercial vehicles ===
BMC produces every variation of urban buses for commercial transportation with 3 different engine selection (diesel, CNG, electric) including 18m articulated bus. BMC also produces apron buses for airport uses.

==== Commercial buses ====
- Neocity 8.5m, 9m, 10m, Diesel, Electric, CNG
- Falcon, Diesel
- Hawk, Diesel
- Condor, Diesel
- Procity 12m, 18m, Diesel, CNG
- 14m Neoport Airport Apron Bus

==== Commercial trucks ====
BMC produces different commercial trucks for commercial transport uses with different transmission and cabin selection. Emission level of the engines of the trucks are Euro6.

- 4x2 Long haulage
- 6x2 Long haulage (with bed)
- 8x2 Long haulage
- 4x2 Tractor (high roof, robotic shift)
- 4x2 Tractor (standard roof, robotic shift)
- 6x4 Construction
- 8x4 Construction

==== Vehicles under development ====
BMC has the capability to develop vehicles according to end user requirements.

- 8x8 Tank transporter (prototype already manufactured)
- 8x8 Armored personnel carrier (APC)
- Armored SUV (different variants)
- Şahin 4x4 Light armored vehicle

== BMC Power ==
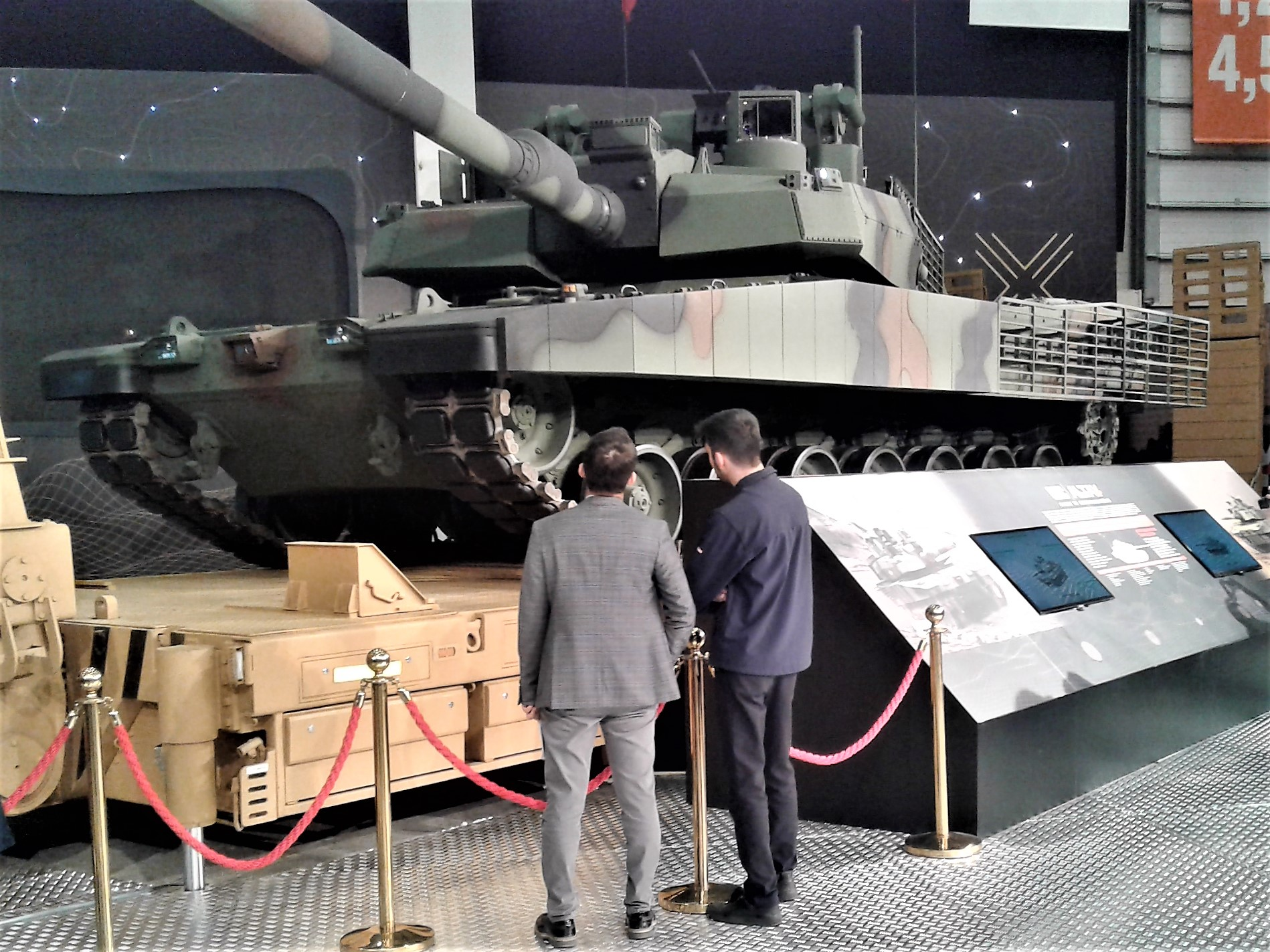
Altay MBT

In 2017, up to 700 HP engines for new generation armoured vehicles contract was signed between BMC and SSB.

Türkiye attempted to acquire power packs from international manufacturers several times, but each attempt resulted in open or discreet sanctions. Instead, they initiated their own power pack development project. In 2018, BMC Power won the tender for 250 units of 1,800 HP indigenous tank engines for the Turkish Altay main battle tank to be utilized by the Turkish Army. The project was updated to produce 1,500 HP output. BATU V12 is a turbocharged diesel engine and will have indigenous transmission and cooling equipment.

BMC Power is also developing engines for the naval industry.

== BMC Rail Systems ==
BMC is planning to produce rail and metro train wagons. In this regard, BMC and Swiss Stadler formed a joint venture partnership.

== Design ==
The BMC Profesyonel and BMC Megastar models are designed by Pininfarina.
