= Metius (disambiguation) =

Metius (1571–1635) was a Dutch geometer and astronomer.

Metius may also refer to:

- Metius (crater), a lunar crater in the family Carabidae
- Metius (beetle), a genus of beetle
- Jacob Metius (after 1571–1624/1631), Dutch instrument-maker and lens grinder, brother of the astrometer
