= BMC Vuran =

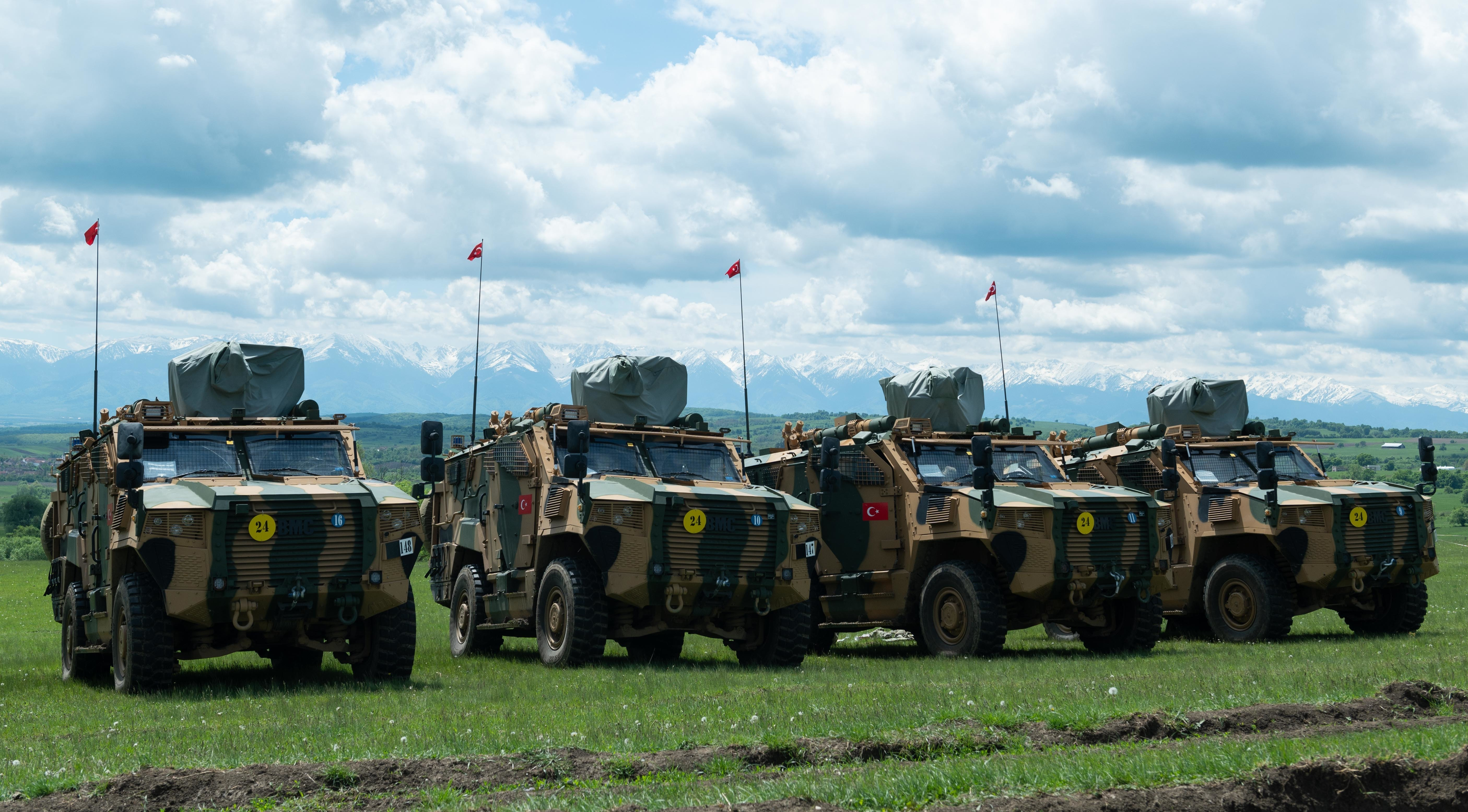
- Several BMC Vuran vehicles in formation during a NATO exercise.
- Type: Infantry mobility vehicle
- Place of origin: Turkey

Service history
- In service: 2019-Present
- Wars: Second Libyan Civil War; 2019 Turkish offensive into north-eastern Syria

Production history
- Designer: BMC (Turkey)
- Manufacturer: BMC (Turkey)
- Variants: 4x4

Specifications
- Height: 3.2 m
- Armor: STANAG 4569 Level 3 (MRAP) a
- Main armament: 7.62 or 12.7 mm machine guns
- Engine: TUNA
- Ground clearance: 345 mm
- Fuel capacity: 310 liter
- Operational range: 1000 km at 60 km/h

BMC Vuran (Turkish for "Striker") is a Turkish mine-resistant ambush protected (MRAP) vehicle built by BMC Otomotiv for use in the Turkish Land Forces, however has also seen use in other countries as well.

== Variants ==
- BMC Vuran (4X4) – Multi-purpose armored vehicle without gun turret
- BMC Vuran (4X4) – Aselsan SARP dual remote controlled weapon system (UKSS) with gun turret
- BMC Vuran (4X4) – Aselsan Alkar 120 mm integrated mortar carrier
- BMC Vuran - SUNGUR low altitude air defense system with two PORSAV (MANPAD) missile launcher pods

== Operators ==
- El Salvador: 11 in use with the Salvadoran Army and 5 with the National Civil Police.
- Georgia: The purchase of 46 vehicles was announced through a 2023 report mentioning a Georgian–Turkish procurement agreement from 2022. The first batches were delivered and accepted into service with the Georgian Land Forces in February 2024. The final batch was delivered on 12 June 2024.
- Kosovo: A deal to purchase the BMC Vuran was signed in 2021. The first vehicles, two 120 mm mortar variants, were delivered and accepted into service with the Kosovo Security Force in late 2022. On 10 May 2024, six more vehicles were delivered with 120 mm mortars. The Ministry of Defense purchased a total of 12 BMC Vuran 120 mm and 81 mm mortar carriers. The KSF may acquire a total of 15 to 30 vehicles.
- Libya: 40+ vehicles in service.
- Tunisia: Bought for evaluation. Known to be officially exported to Tunisia as of December 2020.
- Turkey:
  - Turkish Land Forces: 230+ vehicles delivered out of 512 ordered in total.
  - Gendarmerie General Command: 200 vehicles on order. Deliveries are currently ongoing as of 2023 and include ALKAR 120 mm mortar carriers and variants equipped with MARS (Mobile Adjustable Ramp System).
  - General Directorate of Security: in use with Police Special Operations Department.
  - Coast Guard Command: 1 vehicle purchased for evaluation, seen in active use in the aftermath of the 2023 Turkey-Syria earthquake.
- Turkmenistan: While Vuran sales to Turkmenistan have never been officially announced, a variant equipped with Turkish-made Aselsan SARP DUAL remote controlled weapon station was spotted in use with State Border Service of Turkmenistan, first seen during a televised visit of Turkmenistan’s then-president Gurbanguly Berdimuhamedow to the country’s border outpost in 2018.
