= METİ (EOD vehicle) =

Turkish explosive disposal vehicle

METİ, in capitalized form short for (Turkish: Mayın ve El Yapımı Patlayıcı Tespit İmha Aracı), literally land mine and improvised explosive device detection and disposal vehicle, is a wheeled armored explosive ordnance disposal (EOD) vehicle. It was developed in Turkey and manufactured by the BMC Turkey. Introduced in 2021, it is in use by the Turkish Army.

== METİ vehicle ==
Developed for the needs of the Turkish Army for land mine and improvised explosive device disposal, the four-wheel armored vehicle carries nine personnel. It has hydraulic jacks for stabilization, and is capable of high protection against ballistic missiles and mines, electronic countermeasure of radio and radar jamming as well as fire extinguishing. A camera enables surveillanceof places difficult to access. The robotic arm mounted on the can be operated from inside the vehicle and also remotely from the vehicle to grab and hold items in inaccessible places. With the help of variouse attachments. The robotic arm can perform various functions, such as to detect hiden cables, break hard ground with air hammer, soften soil with harrow, remove earth with loader bucket and cut cables with cutter. Manufactured by the BMC Turkey, it entered service in the Turkish Army early December 2021.

== METİ teams ==
Established in 2016, the METİ reams are a formation of the Gendarmerie General Command. As of 2020, 70 officers, 635 non-commissioned officers, 875 specialist gendarmerie personnel and 345 specialists were trained in praxis in six-week courses . The 145 METİ team personnel disposed 1,675 explosive ordnance in Turkey so far.
