= Maritime Search and Security Operations Team =

Sahil Güvenlik Özel Harekat
- Turkish: sahil güvenlik özel harekat
- Country: Turkey
- Type: Coast Guard Special Forces
- Role: Maritime law enforcement Special operations
- Garrison/HQ: Bakanlıklar/ANKARA
- Nickname(s): SÖH
- Motto(s): GUTSY AND BRAVE (mettlesome and brave)
- Colors: Blue Black Red
- March: Alay Marşı (Regiment March) & Coast Guard March
- Mascot(s): MONK SEAL
- Anniversaries: Cabotage Day 1 July
- Engagements: Operation Atilla; War on drugs; Fight against smuggling; Refugee rescue operations

The Maritime Search and Security Operations Team is the special forces command of the Turkish Coast Guard. Formerly named DAGOT was abolished and later became SÖH Maritime Search and Security Operations Team also called the Coast Guard Special Operations Team as well. They ensure security in Turkey's territorial waters, coasts and inland waters and prevent crime. They are in charge of providing security in search and rescue operations in the open seas and organizing drug and terrorist operations in line with the orders given. They receive training in SCUBA diving, parachuting, combat swimming, ship capture and confiscation, and special operations. In 2016, Turkish Coast Guard units carried out operations in international waters for the first time with 2 corvettes and 1 Coast Guard aircraft. The operation, named Operation Albatross, resulted in the seizure of 13.6 tons of cannabis and the capture of 9 Syrian nationals aboard a Bolivia-flagged ship, the Jaudi, which was sailing from west of the island of Cyprus to the Libyan coast. 1 Coast Guard Special Operations team participated in the operation.

== See also ==
- Coast Guard Command (Turkey)
