= Métis (Belgian Congo) =

People of mixed African and European descent

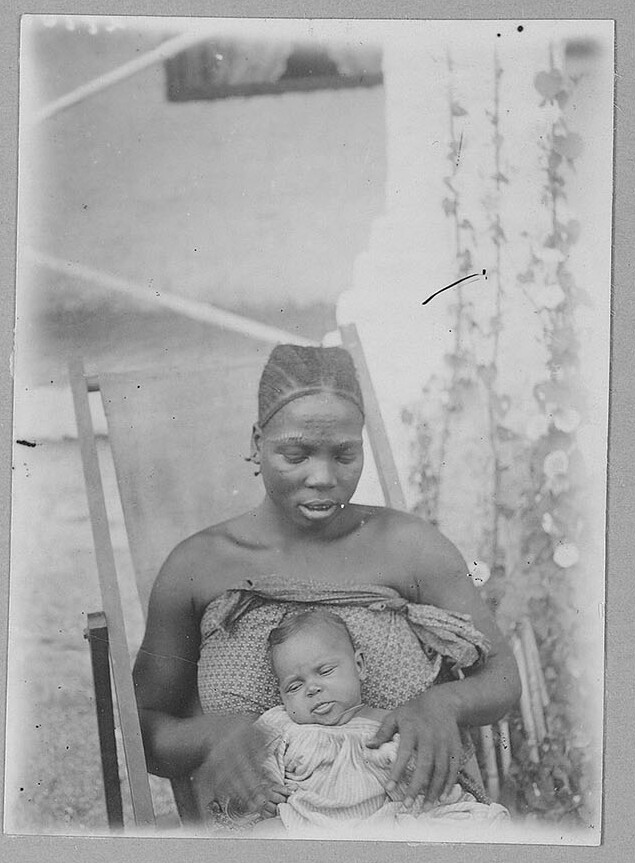
A Congolese mother and her métis baby.

The Métis people of the former Congo Free State/Belgian Congo (sometimes including Ruanda-Urundi) are individuals of mixed African and European descent, primarily born to Belgian colonial settlers and Congolese women.

During Belgian rule over the Congo, which began under the personal rule of Leopold II of Belgium in the 1880s (known as the Congo Free State) and continued after the territory was ceded to the Belgian state in 1908 (known as the Belgian Congo), colonial authorities enforced a rigid racial hierarchy. This led to a policy where thousands of mixed-race children, born to Congolese mothers and European fathers, were abducted from their families and placed in Christian religious institutions. These children, labeled as mulâtres (mulattoes) or métis (mixed race), faced systematic discrimination and segregation, often losing all contact with their mothers and cultural roots. In 2018, five of them filed a lawsuit against the Belgian state, accusing it of crimes against humanity for its role in their abductions. Although Belgium apologized in 2019 for the treatment of these children, the government resisted financial compensation. A Brussels court initially ruled against the women in 2021, but in December 2024, the Brussels Court of Appeal found Belgium responsible for crimes against humanity due to its treatment of Métis children, ordering compensation for the five Métis women who had sued the state.
