= Coast Guard Command (Turkey) =

Coast guard service of the Republic of Turkey

Coast Guard Command Sahil Güvenlik Komutanlığı
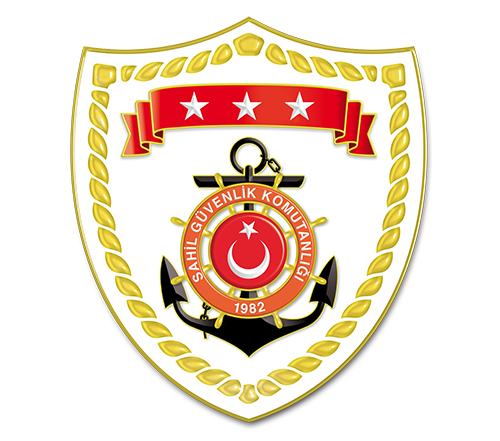
- Seal of the Turkish Coast Guard

- Racing Stripe

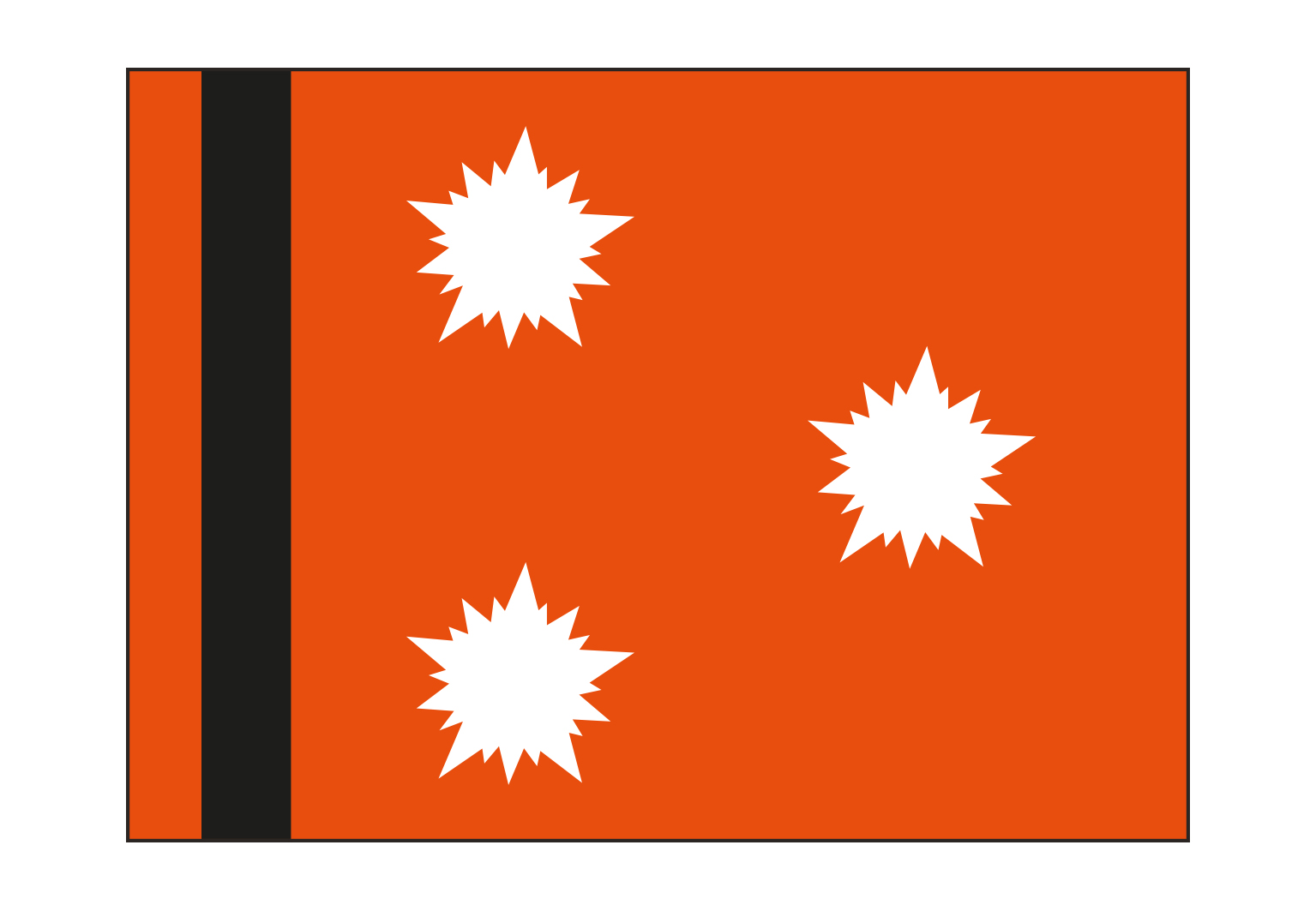
- Flag

Agency overview
- Formed: July 9, 1982
- Preceding agency: General Command of Customs Guard
- Employees: 10,000 active personnel

Jurisdictional structure
- Operations jurisdiction: Turkey
- Constituting instrument: Law no. 2692 on Coast Guard Command dated 9 July 1982
- General nature: Gendarmerie
- Specialist jurisdiction: Coastal patrol, marine border protection, marine search and rescue

Operational structure
- Headquarters: Ankara
- Elected officer responsible: Minister Ali Yerlikaya, Minister of the Interior
- Agency executive: Vice admiral Ahmet Kendir, Commandant
- Parent agency: Ministry of the Interior

Website
- https://en.sg.gov.tr/

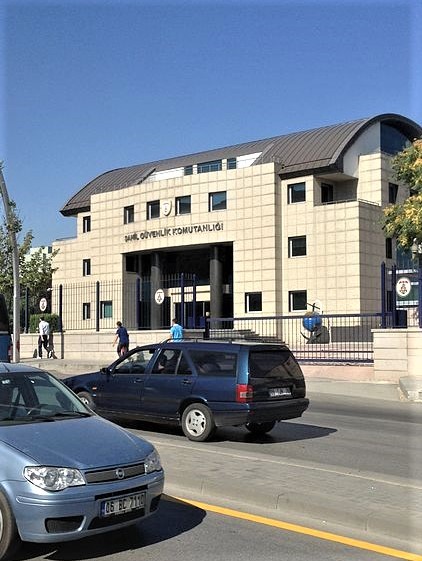
Headquarters of the Coast Guard Command in Ankara.

The Coast Guard Command (Turkish: Sahil Güvenlik Komutanlığı) is the coast guard service of Turkey. The Turkish Coast Guard is under the command of the Ministry of the Interior. However, during wartime some of its elements can be subordinated to Turkish Naval Forces by the President.

The Turkish Coast Guard is organized into four area commands: the Black Sea, the Sea of Marmara, the Aegean Sea, and the Mediterranean Sea.

== Organization ==
Affiliated with the Ministry Of Interior (Turkish: T.C. İçişleri Bakanlığı), the Coast Guard is responsible for controlling the maritime jurisdiction areas and coasts of Turkiye and fighting all kind of illegal action in the responsibility area. Turkish Coast Guard is also the main Search and Rescue Coordination Authority in Turkish SAR Zone.

== Strength ==
With a personnel strength of about 5,500, the coast guard is responsible for maintaining the security of the coast and territorial waters. The Coast guard is also responsible of search and rescue (SAR) operations, and for protecting the marine environment.

== Mission ==
Coast Guard Command is a security service, established on 9 July 1982 by Act 2692, with the purpose of performing missions such as; providing the security of Turkish coasts, territorial waters and inland waters such as the Marmara Sea, Istanbul and Çanakkale Straits, ports and harbors and exercising such rights and powers where Turkey exercises sovereign rights under the rules of both national and international laws at sea areas which fall outside the scope of the general responsibility of the Turkish Naval Forces and to prevent and pursue all kinds of smuggling activities carried out by way of sea. The missions, Coast Guard Command was charged with by Act 2692 are:

- To protect and provide the security of our coasts and territorial waters,
- To provide the safety of life and property at sea.
- To take necessary measures for untethered mines, explosives and suspicious material identified in the sea and on the coast and report them to the authorities concerned.
- To observe and inspect the operating conditions of the aids-to-navigation and report the deficiencies observed to the authorities concerned,
- To disarm the refugees entering into our territorial waters and deliver them to the authorities concerned.
- To prevent all kinds of smuggling carried out by way of sea.
- To prevent the actions of the vessels and sea craft in violation of the laws on radio hygiene, passport, anchoring, mooring, fishing, diving and hoisting the flag.
- To inspect the fishing of aquatic products,
- To conduct inspections in order to prevent marine pollution.
- To prevent the smuggling of antiquities by conducting inspections on diving activities.
- To perform search and rescue missions within the search and rescue area of Turkey, in conformity with the International Search and Rescue Convention and National Search and Rescue Regulations.
- To inspect the yacht tourism,
- To participate in the operations conducted for the security of homeland under the command of the Naval Forces, when so ordered.

== Public order units ==
- Coast Guard Command (Ankara)
- Coast Guard Academy (Ankara)
- Coast Guard Marmara and Straits Regional Command (Istanbul)
  - Coast Guard Istanbul Group Command
  - Coast Guard İmralı Special Task Group Command
  - Coast Guard Southern Marmara Group Command (Bursa)
  - Coast Guard Çanakkale Group Command
  - Coast Guard North Aegean Group Command (Ayvalık / Çanakkale)
  - Coast Guard Marmara and Straits Regional Repair Support Command (Istanbul)
    - Sarıyer District Coast Guard Command (Sarıyer / İstanbul)
    - Coast Guard Sarıyer Central Police Station Command (Yenimahalle / İstanbul)
    - Beşiktaş District Coast Guard Command (Beşiktaş / İstanbul)
    - Coast Guard station command (İstinye / Istanbul)
    - Tuzla District Coast Guard Command (Tuzla / Istanbul)
    - Coast Guard Tuzla Police Station Command (Tuzla / Istanbul)
    - Kefken District Coast Guard Command (Kefken / Kocaeli)
    - Bakırköy District Coast Guard Command (Ataköy / Istanbul)
    - Coast Guard Ataköy Central Police Station (Ataköy Marina / Istanbul)
    - Coast Guard Coast Watch Station (MOBESE = Security camera) (Istanbul)
    - Coast Guard Küçükkuyu Patrol Command (Küçükkuyu / Çanakkale)
- Coast Guard Black Sea Regional Command (Samsun)
  - Coast Guard Trabzon Group Command
  - Coast Guard Amasra Group Command
  - Coast Guard Supply Support Command
  - Coast Guard Black Sea Region Repair Support Command
- Coast Guard Aegean Sea Regional Command (İzmir)
  - Coast Guard South Aegean Group Command
  - Coast Guard North Aegean Group Command
  - Coast Guard Aegean Sea Regional Repair Support Command
    - Radio Coast Guard (104.7 MHz.) (İzmir)
  - Bodrum Coast Guard Police Station Command (Bodrum / Muğla)
- Coast Guard Mediterranean Regional Command (Mersin)
  - Coast Guard Antalya Group Command
  - Coast Guard İskenderun Group Command
  - Coast Guard Çevlik Patrol Command (Çevlik / Hatay)
- Coast Guard Air Command (İzmir)
  - Coast Guard Samsun Air Group Command
  - Coast Guard Antalya Air Group Command
  - Coast Guard Air Stand Training Fleet Command
  - Coast Guard Air Operations Command
  - Coast Guard Air Supply and Maintenance Command
- Coast Guard Training and Education Command (Antalya)
  - Coast Guard Schools Command
  - Coast Guard Training Central Command
- Coast Guard Supply Center Command (Istanbul)
  - Units subject to Coast Guard Regional Commands
    - Coast Guard Central Station Commands
    - Coast Guard Patrol Commands and affiliated boat Commands
- Diving Safety Security and Search and Rescue
- Coast Guard Intelligence Directorate

== Equipment ==
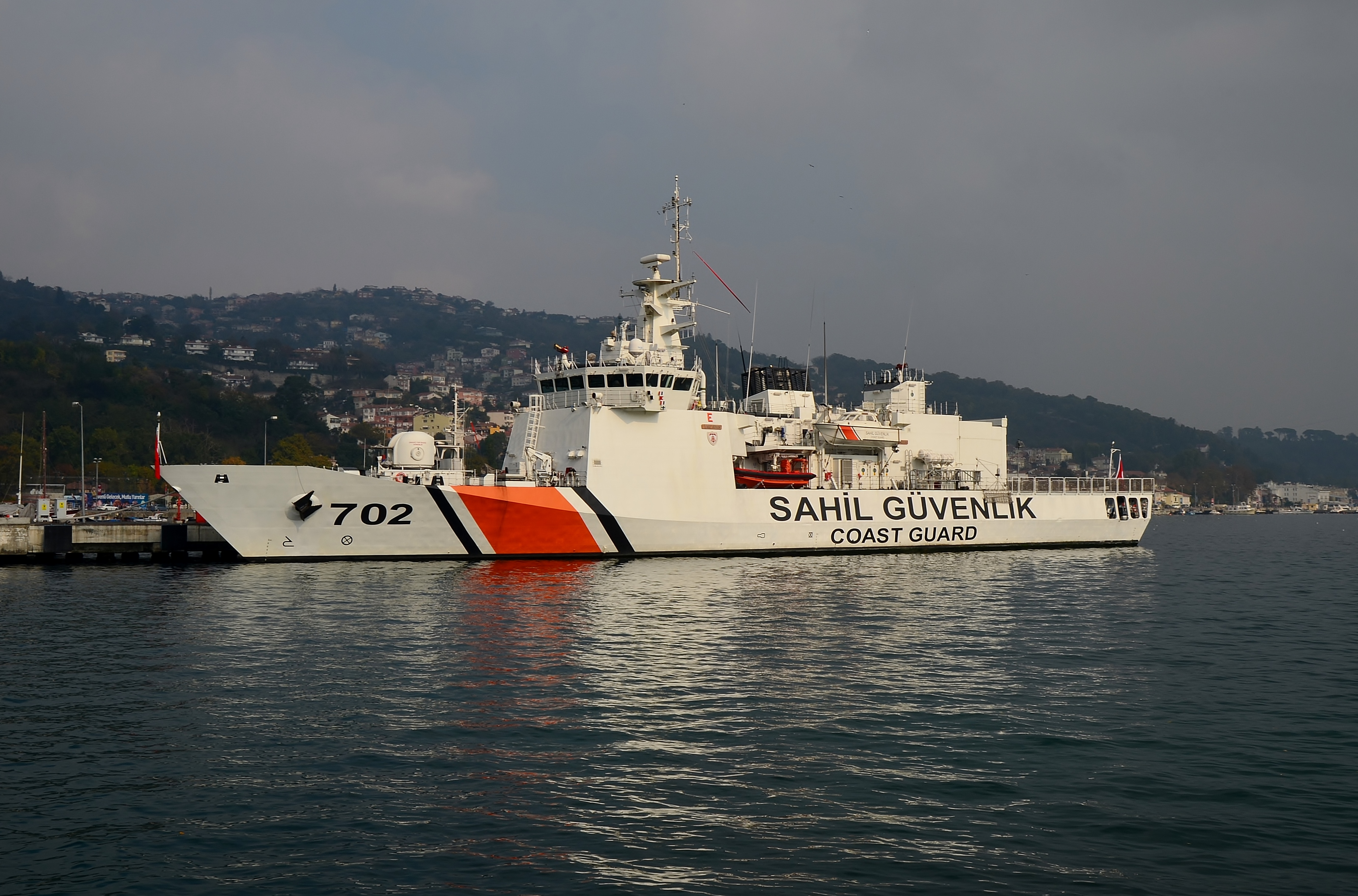
TCSG Güven (SG-702), one of the four Dost-class corvettes of the Turkish Coast Guard Command

Surface patrols are carried out by 52 patrol vessels and smaller craft. The most effective of these are 14 search-and-rescue vessels 220 tons of Turkish design. Smaller 150 ton and 70 ton patrol boats of German design were nearing obsolescence in the mid-1990s. An ambitious construction plan foresaw a major strengthening of the service with eight new vessels of 350–400 tons and 48 ships of 180–300 tons. Integrated ADVENT MARTI Air Command Control System for CN-235 aircraft. Coast Guard is equipped also with 20 mobile radars.

AB-412 EP SG Helicopter modernization project : Within the scope of the project, the Aselflir R400D Electro-Optic System, KDU-45 Keyboard Display Unit, SMFD-810 Display and Internal Communication System developed by ASELSAN in order to maximize the current and future operational capability of the Coast Guard Command will be integrated with avionics and navigation systems as well as the Surface Search Radar developed with domestic and national resources. HELRAD Maritime Search and Weather RADAR-MSWR will be integrated on the AB-412EP SAR helicopters. First delivery of modernized helicopter is expected by 2025.

Planned Acquisition : T625 Gökbey and T925 helicopters.

Turkish Coast Guard
Patrol Vessels
Quantity	Name/Class	Displacement	Notes
-	600 class	-	2+6 optional on order.
4	Dost-class patrol corvette	1750 tons	Based on the Sirio-class patrol vessel
18(+4)	80-class	195 tons	4 used by TRNC
4	SAR 35-class	210 tons	
5(+4)	SAR 33-class	180 tons	+4 SAR 37 variant
13	Kaan 33-class	110 tons	
9	Kaan 29-class	90 tons	
17	Kaan 19-class	30 tons	
18	Kaan 15-class	15 tons	
15	SAR 1906	33.6 tonnes	
107(+6)	Ares 35 FPB	11.85 tonnes	6 used by TRNC
10(+3)	Ares 42 Hector (SAGET)	13 tonnes	3 used by TRNC
1	OKHAN USV	N/A	

Quantity	Boats
30	Control boats_1
84	Composite hull inspection boats
38	Control boats_2
50	CG Control Boats (Rubber Inflatable Boats and Patrol Boats)
17	DEGAK Coastal Safety and Salvage Teams (Rubber Inflatable Boat)
13	SAGET Coast Guard and Safety Teams (Rubber Inflatable Boat)
2	Securıty boats
6	Search and rescue boats

Name	Image	Type	In service	Note
Aircraft				
CN-235		Maritime Patrol	3	Being upgraded with ADVENT MARTI CMS developed by HAVELSAN.
Helicopter				
Bell AB-412		Maritime Patrol/Utility	14	Upgrades by ASELSAN
TAI T625 Gökbey		Maritime patrol/Utility		First batch : 3 on order. 6 more planned to be delivered after first three.
Unmanned Aerial Vehicle				
Baykar Bayraktar TB2		UCAV	6	
UÇBEY	-	VTOL UAV	N/A	
Armoured Vehicle				
BMC Vuran		MRAP	x	
Otokar Cobra		MRAP	x	

=== Others ===
Model	Origin	Type	References
Sarsilmaz SAR 9	Turkey	Semi-automatic pistol	
Canik TP9	Turkey	Semi-automatic pistol	
SAR 109T	Turkey	Submachine gun	
Heckler & Koch MP5	West Germany	Submachine gun	
MKE MPT	Turkey	Assault rifle	
Heckler & Koch HK33	West Germany	Assault rifle	
Heckler & Koch G3	West Germany	Assault rifle	
M4 carbine	United States	Assault rifle	
Canik M2 QCB	Turkey	Machine gun	
MG 3 machine gun	West Germany	Machine gun	
OTO MELARA DARDO	Turkey	Naval gun	
OERLIKON 20mm	Turkey	Naval gun	
ASELSAN STAMP 12.7mm	Turkey	Naval gun	
DEMRE	Turkey	Remotely operated underwater vehicle	

== Ranks ==
=== Officers ===
NATO code	OF-10	OF-9	OF-8	OF-7	OF-6	OF-5	OF-4	OF-3	OF-2	OF-1
Turkish Coast; Guard Command
Turkish Coast; Guard Command			Koramiral	Tümamiral	Tuğamiral	Albay	Yarbay	Binbaşı	Yüzbaşı	Üsteğmen	Teğmen

=== Enlisted ===
NATO code	OR-9	OR-8	OR-7	OR-6	OR-5		OR-4			OR-3	OR-2	OR-1
Turkish Coast; Guard Command							Kıdemli uzman çavuş 2 / Kıdemli uzman çavuş 1		Kıdemli uzman onbaşı 2 / Kıdemli uzman onbaşı 1			No insignia
Turkish Coast; Guard Command	Astsubay kıdemli başçavuş	Astsubay başçavuş	Astsubay kıdemli üstçavuş	Astsubay üstçavuş	Astsubay kıdemli çavuş	Astsubay çavuş	Kıdemli uzman çavuş 2 / Kıdemli uzman çavuş 1	Uzman çavuş	Kıdemli uzman onbaşı 2 / Kıdemli uzman onbaşı 1	Uzman onbaşı		Er

The force's highest-ranking officer is a Rear Admiral U.H. (Tümamiral). The coast guards wear the same rank and rate insignia as ordinary navy officers but with an orange thin arc-shaped stripe, with the words "Sahil Güvenlik" (Coast Guards) embroidered in black, worn on their upper right arm, close to the shoulder. Also, special pennants are flown for the senior officers of the Coast Guard.

- Commander of the Coast Guard : For the Commander of the Coast Guard, a square orange coloured flag with a black stripe running diagonally across the left side of the flag, also bearing three bombs is flown.
- Coast Guard Commander (Rank of Captain) : For these officers, a swallow tailed pennant with a horizontal black stripe across the flag, dividing it in two, also bearing a bomb on each side of the stripe, is flown.
- Coast Guard School Commander : The Coast Guard School Commander has a square orange flag, with a white anchor in the center and a vertical black stripe just near the mast.
- Coast Guard Group Commander : The Group Commander has a triangular orange pennant, with a black anchor in the middle.

== Gallery ==
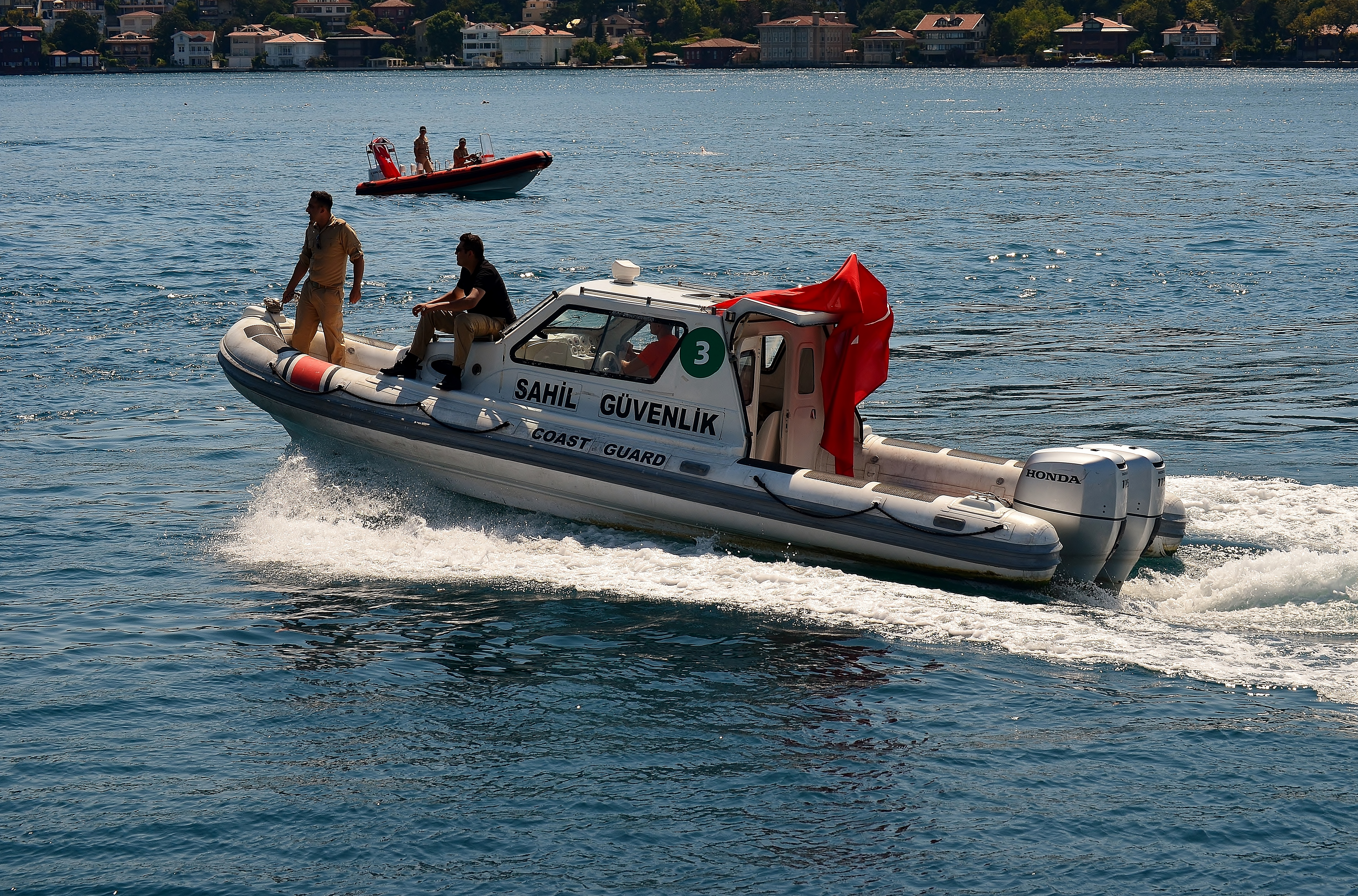
Patrol boat

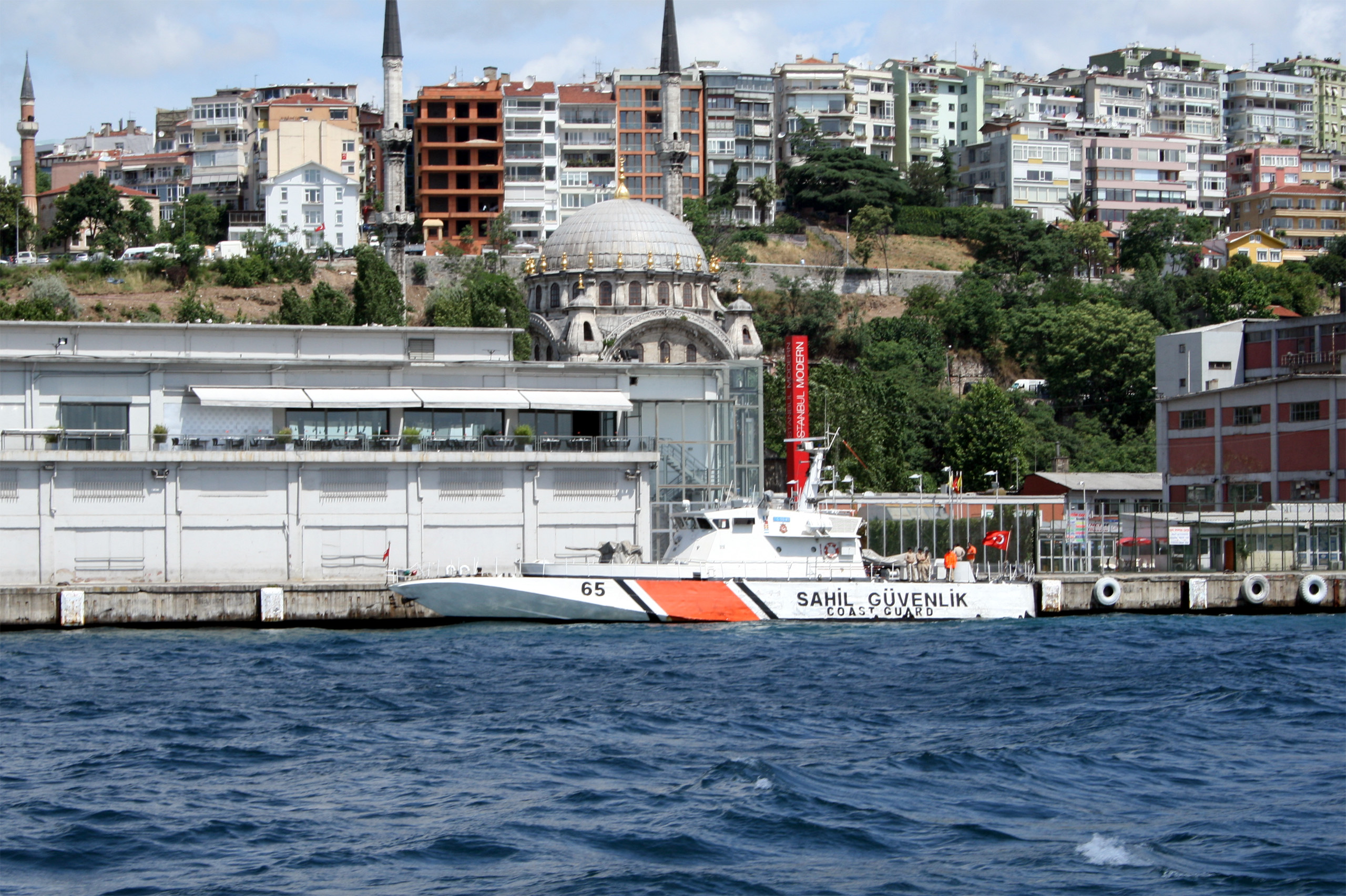
TCSG 65 (SAR 33-class)

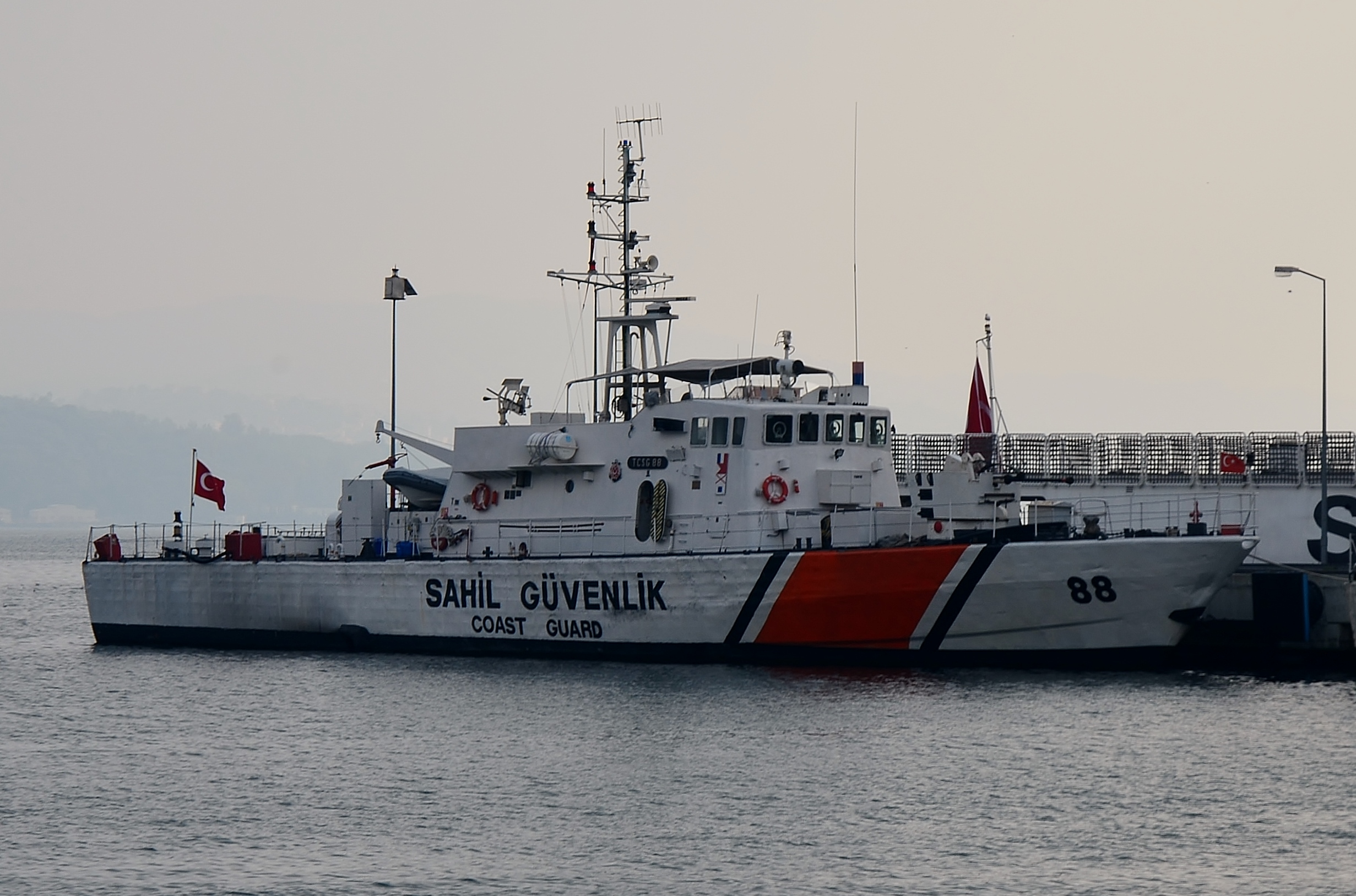
TCSG 88 (Kaan 29-class)

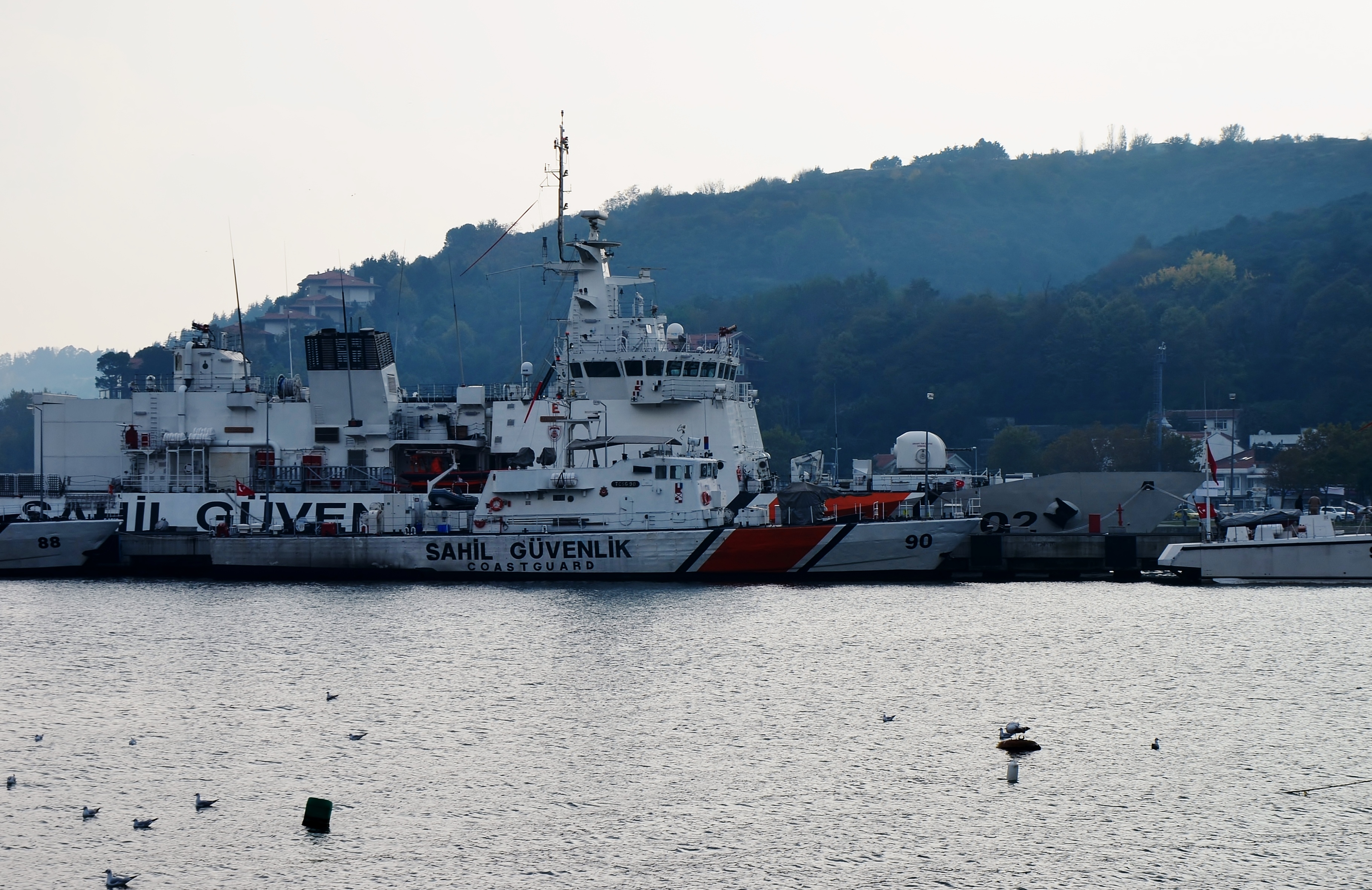
TCSG 90

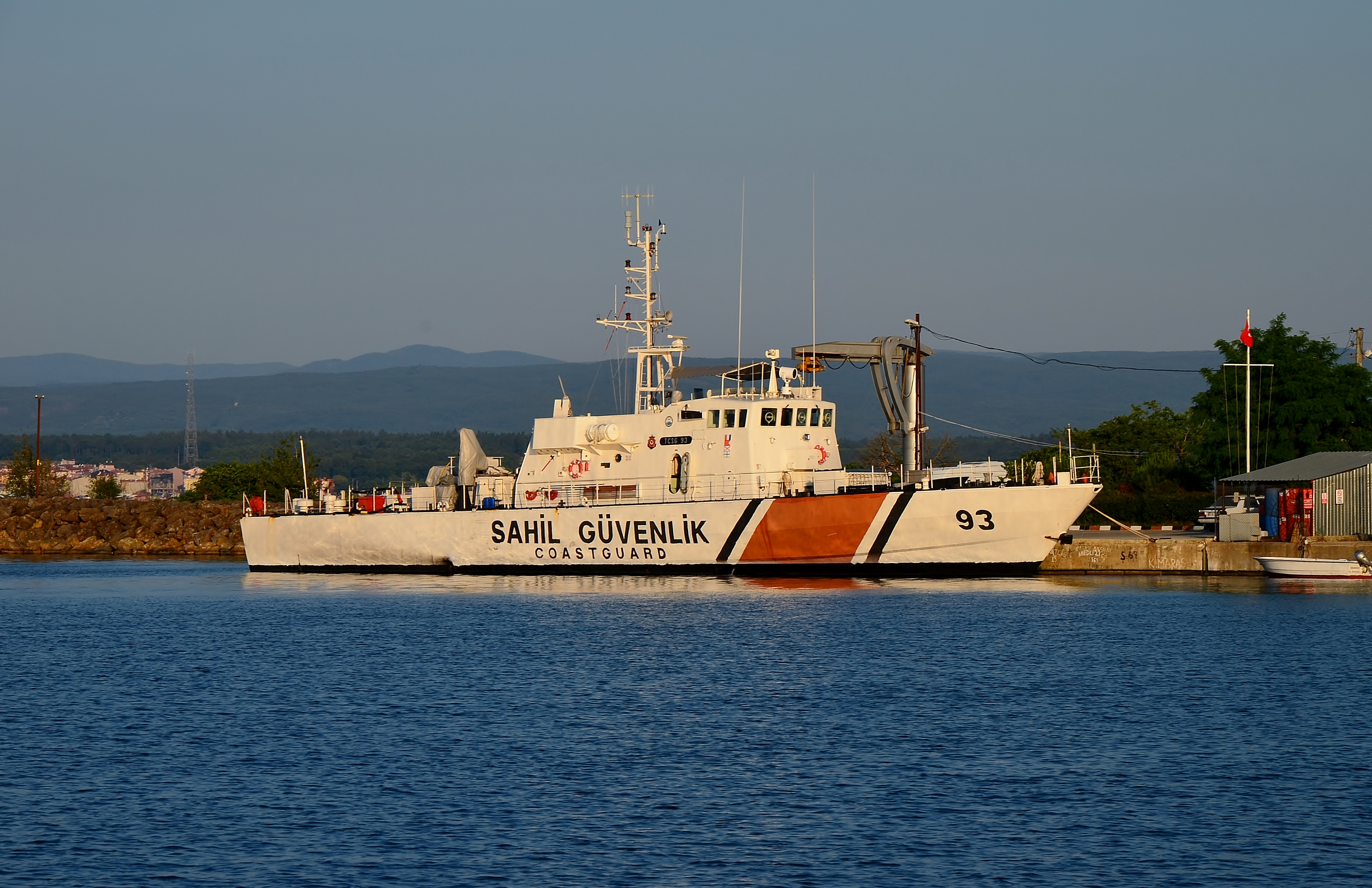
TCSG 93 (80-class)

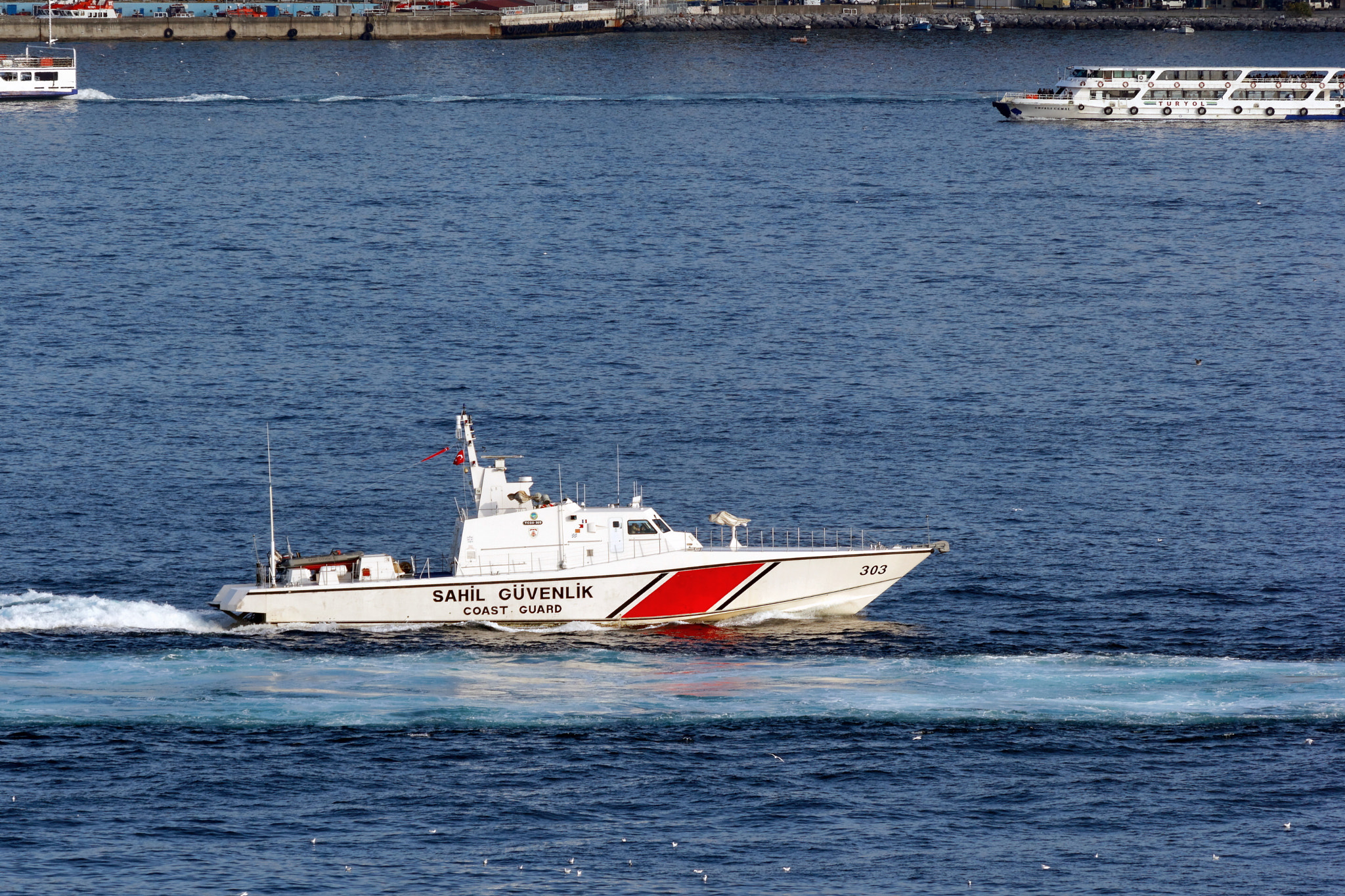
TCSG 303

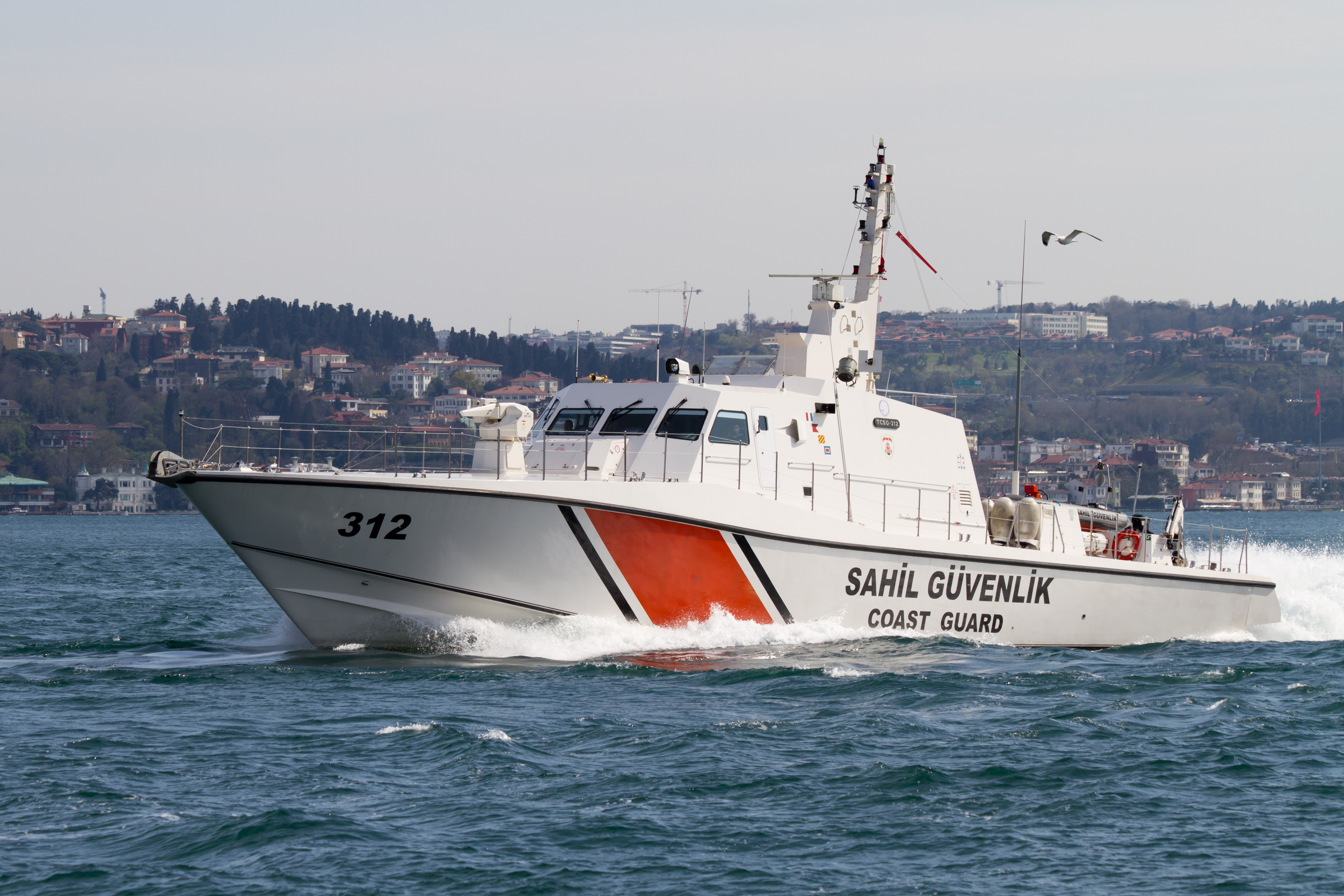
TCSG 312 (Kaan 33-class)

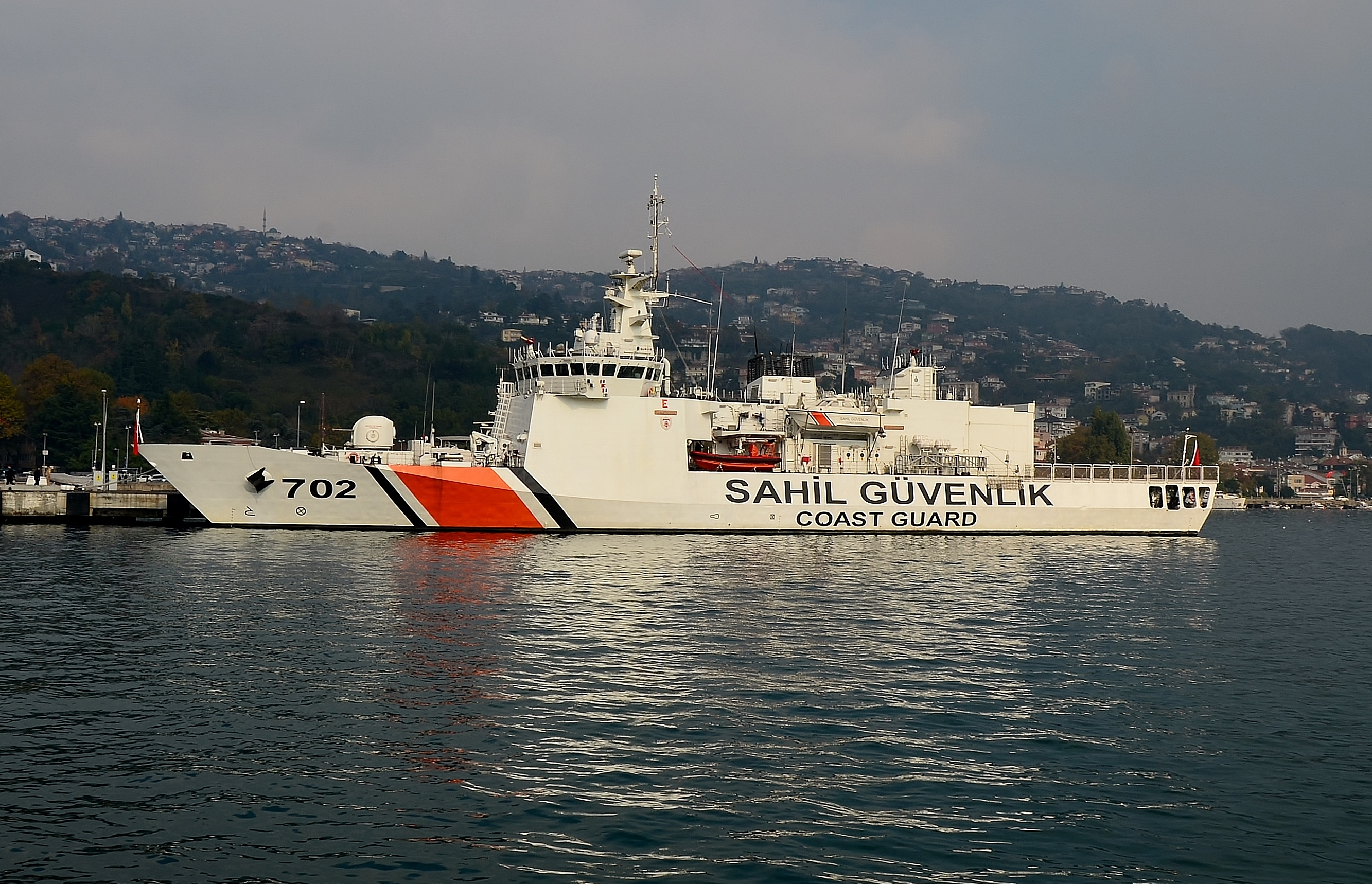
TCSG 702 (TCSG Güven)

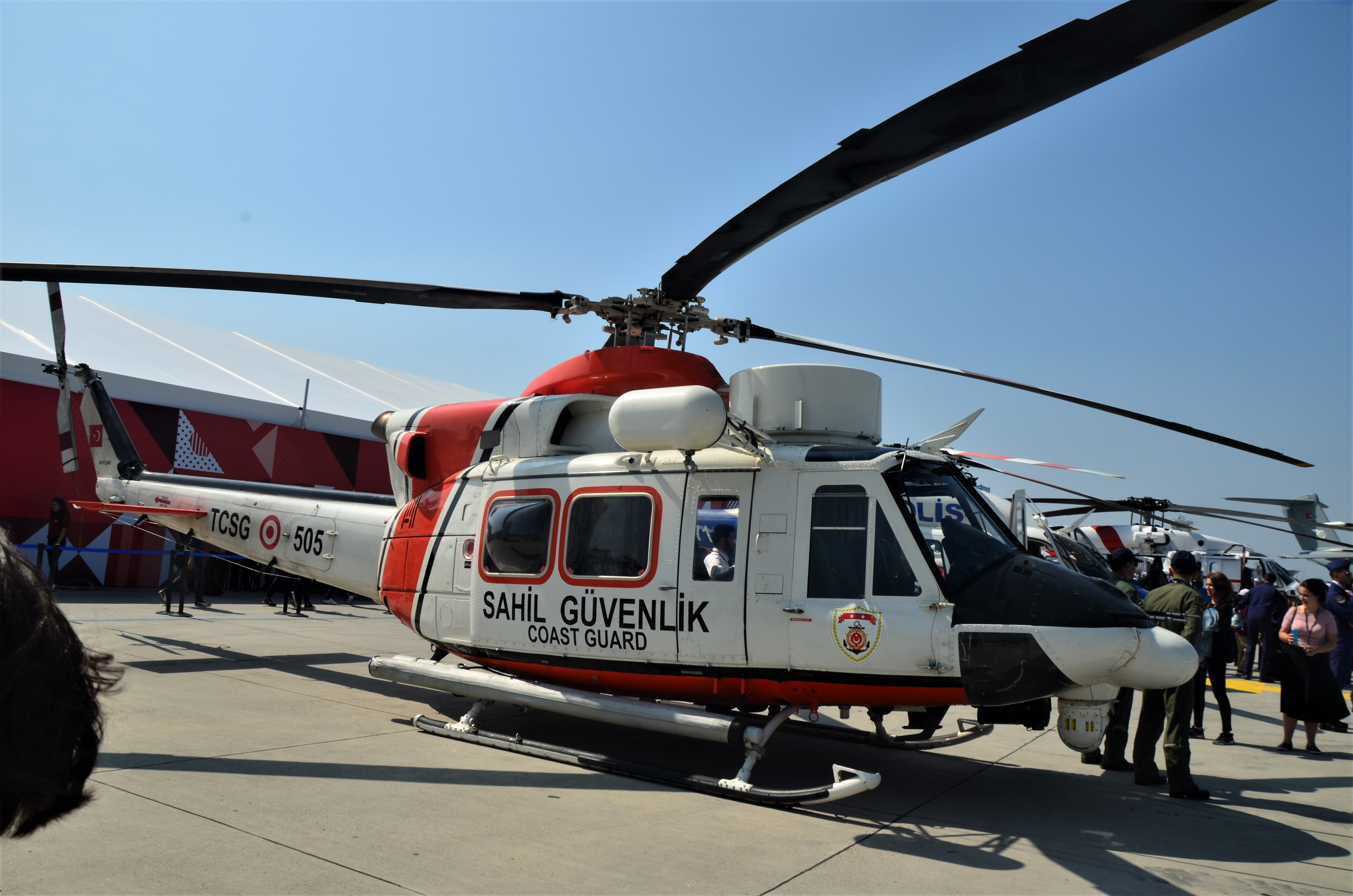
TCSG 505 Agusta-Bell AB-412)

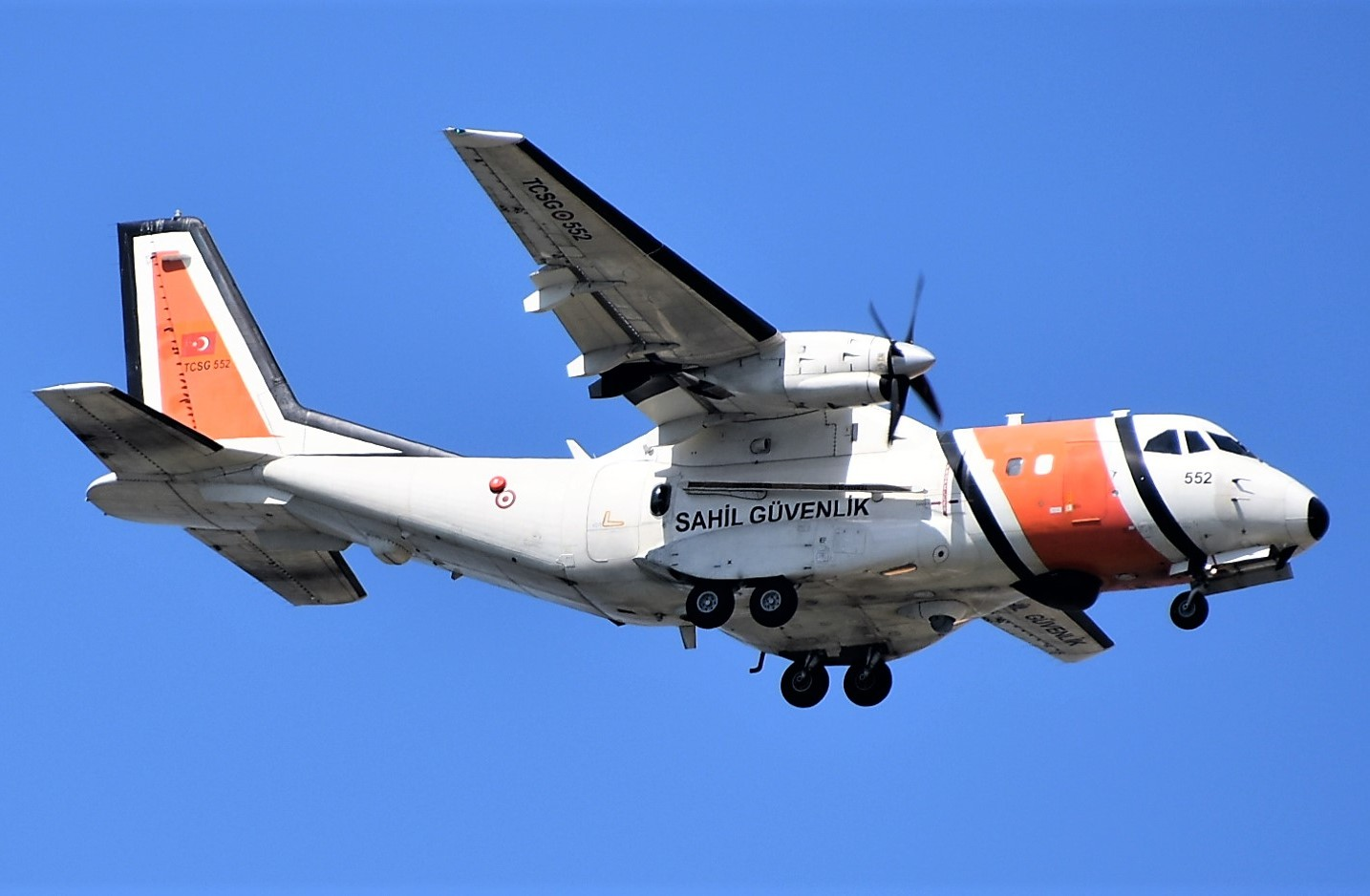
TCSG 552 (CASA CN-235)

== See also ==
- Maritime Search and Security Operations Team
- Turkish Naval Forces
