= Gendarmerie Search and Rescue Battalion Command =

Turkish search and rescue unit

Gendarmerie Commando Search and Rescue Battalion Command
- Jandarma Komando Arama Kurtarma Tabur Komutanlığı
- Active: 1 September 1999–present
- Country: Turkey
- Allegiance: Gendarmerie General Command
- Branch: Turkish Gendarmerie
- Type: Special Forces
- Role: Search and rescue Mountain rescue Search and rescue dog Swift water rescue CBRN defense
- Garrison/HQ: Ankara
- Mascot: Kangal Shepherd Dog – Mount Ararat

Commanders
- First: Major Burak Özer

Insignia
- Abbreviation: J.A.K.

The Gendarmerie Search and Rescue Battalion Command (Turkish: Jandarma Arama Kurtarma Tabur Komutanlığı), JAK, is the Search and rescue unit of the Gendarmerie General Command in Turkey. It has several missions which all kinds of natural and man-made disasters that may occur inside of domestic and abroad places with in mountains, caves, canyons, underwater to conduct search and rescue operations with, was established on 1 September 1999 in Ankara under the command of the Gendarmerie Commando Special Public Order.

To perform these tasks; Within the JAK Battalion Command, there is a Special Search and Rescue Company consisting of Disaster Search and Rescue Companies and Mountaineering, Underwater and Dog Search and Rescue Teams.

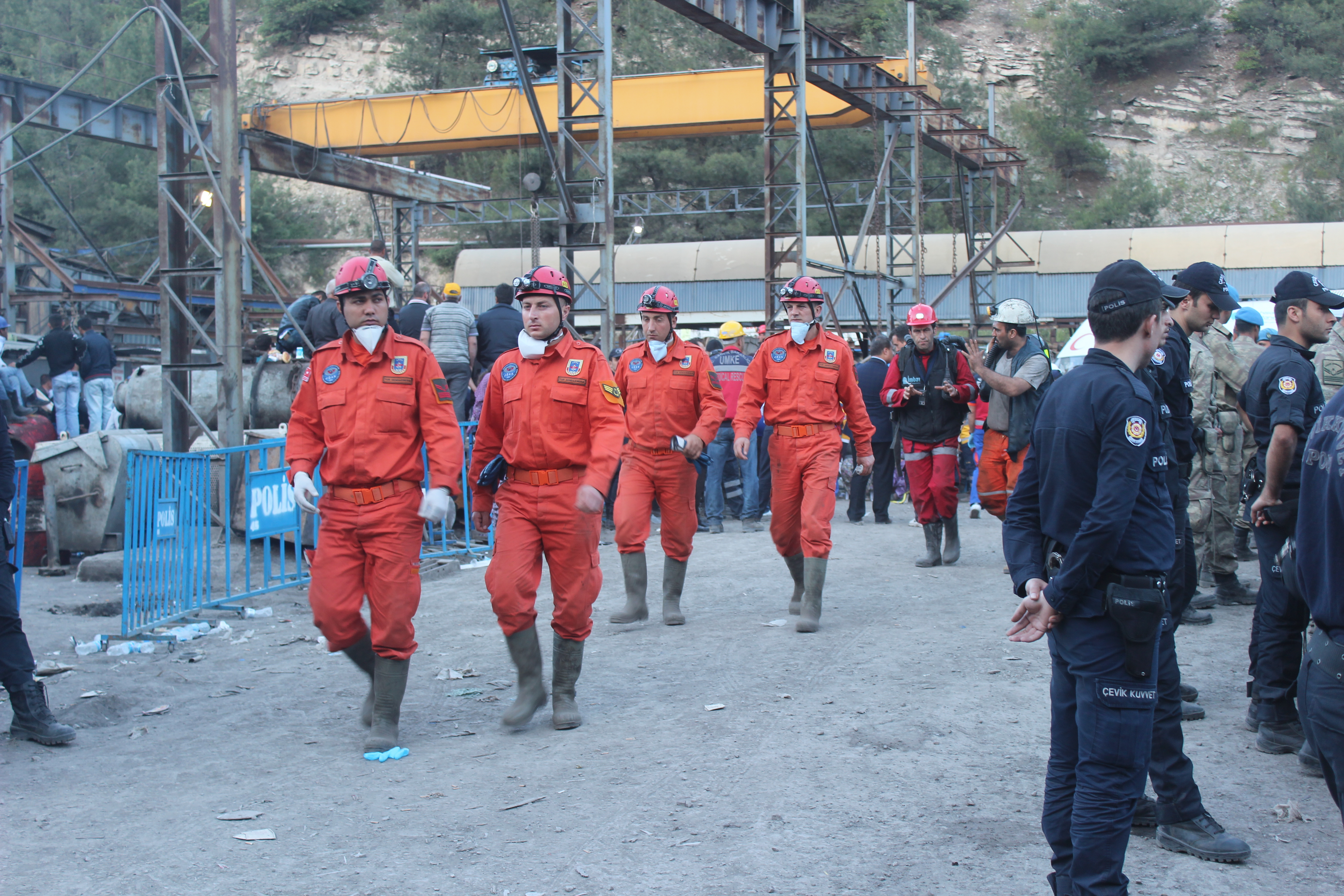
JAK Disaster Search and Rescue teams during Soma mine disaster.

== Training activities ==
- Earthquake Search and Rescue Training
- Avalanche Search and Rescue Training
- CBRN Training
- Flood Search and Rescue Training
- Fire Search and Rescue Training
- Mountaineering Education
- Underwater Training
- Search and rescue dog Team Training
- Skiing Training
- Snowmobiling and over-snow vehicle Training
- First aid Training

== Departments ==
JAK Battalion Command; has three Disaster Search and Rescue and one Special Search and Rescue Company (CBRN defense). Also thirteen Underwater Search and rescue Teams, twenty-three Mountaineering Rescue Teams and five Gendarmerie Search and rescue dog Team.

Unit	Branch	Size	Badge	Details
Gendarmerie Search and Rescue Battalion Command (JAK)	Headquarters			The headquarters of JAK is in Ankara, Bakanlıklar
Disaster Search and Rescue	Natural and man-made disasters	3 units		Teams are located in Istanbul, Ankara and Erzurum. They sometimes help to fight disasters with the Disaster and Emergency Management Presidency in neighboring countries.
Underwater Search and Rescue	Underwater search and recovery	13 units		Established to intervene in the area of responsibility and to find missing persons, the largest team in JAK and it is slowly becoming a separate organization. Teams are located in 9 Provincial gendarmerie HQ; (19 units): Ankara-Güvercinlik (4 units for drowning incidents in lakes, rivers and dams of Central Anatolia Region ); Adana-Yüreğir, Adana Province; Antalya –Muratpaşa, Mediterranean Region, Turkey mostly for Manavgat Dam area.; Erzurum – Palandöken, Eastern Anatolia region; Diyarbakır-Yenişehir, Southeastern Anatolia Region for Atatürk Dam & Keban Dam area.; Istanbul-Sarıyer (2 units), Marmara region; İzmir-Buca, Aegean Region; Van-Edremit for Lake Van area; The team has also Zero Waste Blue Project.
Mountaineering Search Rescue	Mountain rescue,	23 units		Established to provide safety and security in winter tourism centers, evacuate patients/injured people in adverse weather and terrain, and preventive arm enforcement in mountainous/forest areas where extreme sports are performed. Tasks include: Intervene in incidents that occur in regions where there is no possibility of motor transfer in difficult nature and terrain conditions or where pedestrian transfer conditions are difficult, Providing safety and security services on the runways where winter tourism is performed, and assisting domestic and foreign tourists who are lost and injured, Reaching and evacuating casualties in accidents where mountaineering sports take place, To reach and evacuate the victims in natural disasters such as earthquakes, floods, avalanches and landslides.; Teams are located in 17 Provincial gendarmerie HQ; ( 23 units): Antalya-Saklıkent, Ardahan-Yalnızçam Mountains, Bolu – Kartalkaya, Bursa – Uludağ mountain (3 units), (Uludağ National Park Turkey the largest ski resort in the country); Erzurum – Palandöken Mountain(2 units), Erzincan –Ergan, Hakkari – Mergabütan, Kocaeli-Kartepe, Isparta-Mount Davraz , Kars – Sarıkamış Mountains National Park (2 units), (see also Battle of Sarikamish); Kastamonu – Ilgaz Mountains (2 units), Kayseri – Mount Erciyes (2 units), Kahramanmaraş-Yedikuyular, Muğla-Fethiye, Niğde – Çamardı, Rize – Çamlıhemşin, Tunceli-Ovacık; Personnel in charge receive training in combating severe cold, skiing training, snowmobiling and over-snow vehicle training, first aid training and mountaineering training.
Gendarmerie Search and rescue dog	Search and rescue dog Team.	5 units		Performs search and rescue in natural and unnatural disasters, illegal human smuggling and avalanche search in winter tourism areas with the help and support of Search and rescue dogs. In the staff of Dog units; There is an Expert Gendarmerie private soldier and an Expert officer which includes a dog. It was put into operation on 18 December 2003 in Nevsehir. Note that other Gendarmerie Dog groups are not included.
Special Search and Rescue Company	CBRN defense	1 unit		This was formed after the ikitelli radioactive waste accident located in Meram/Konya.

== See also ==
- Combat Search and Rescue (Turkish Armed Forces)
- Diving, Safety, Security, Search and Rescue Team of Coast Guard Command (Turkey) (This unit applies to the seas) JAK Underwater Search and rescue team is for inland waters.
- Air Force Search and Rescue Turkey
- Disaster and Emergency Management Presidency Turkey
