= Gendarmerie General Command =

National gendarmerie of Turkey

Gendarmerie General Command Jandarma Genel Komutanlığı
- Emblem of the Gendarmerie General Command

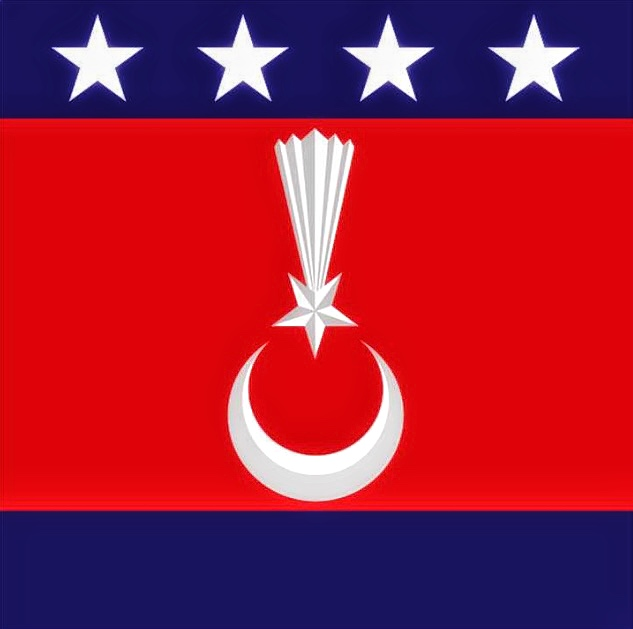
- Flag of the Gendarmerie General Command

Agency overview
- Formed: 1839
- Preceding agencies: Gendarmerie Organisation; Ottoman Gendarmerie
- Employees: 198,317 active personnel

Jurisdictional structure
- Operations jurisdiction: Turkey
- General nature: Gendarmerie

Operational structure
- Headquarters: Ankara
- Elected officer responsible: Mustafa Çiftçi, Minister of the Interior
- Agency executives: General Arif Çetin, Commander; General Ali Çardakçı, Deputy Commander; Lt. General Halis Zafer KOÇ, Deputy Commander; Lt. General İsmail BALIBEK, Deputy Commander; Lt. General Hüseyin KURTOĞLU, Deputy Commander
- Parent agency: Ministry of the Interior, Turkish Armed Forces (in wartime until 2016)

Notables
- Significant operations: Operation Attila; Turkey-PKK Conflict; Turkish involvement in the Syrian Civil War

Website
- www.jandarma.gov.tr

The Gendarmerie General Command (Turkish: Jandarma Genel Komutanlığı) is the national gendarmerie force of Turkey. It is a service branch of the Ministry of Interior responsible for the maintenance of the public order in areas that fall outside the jurisdiction of the General Directorate of Security (generally in rural areas), as well as assuring internal security along with carrying out other specific duties assigned to it by certain laws and regulations. The Commander of the Gendarmerie reports to the Minister of the Interior.

The Gendarmerie has its roots in the Ottoman Empire military law enforcement organization "Subaşı" (later known as the "Zaptiye"). A similar, earlier force called "Şurta" existed during the medieval Seljuk Empire.

== History ==
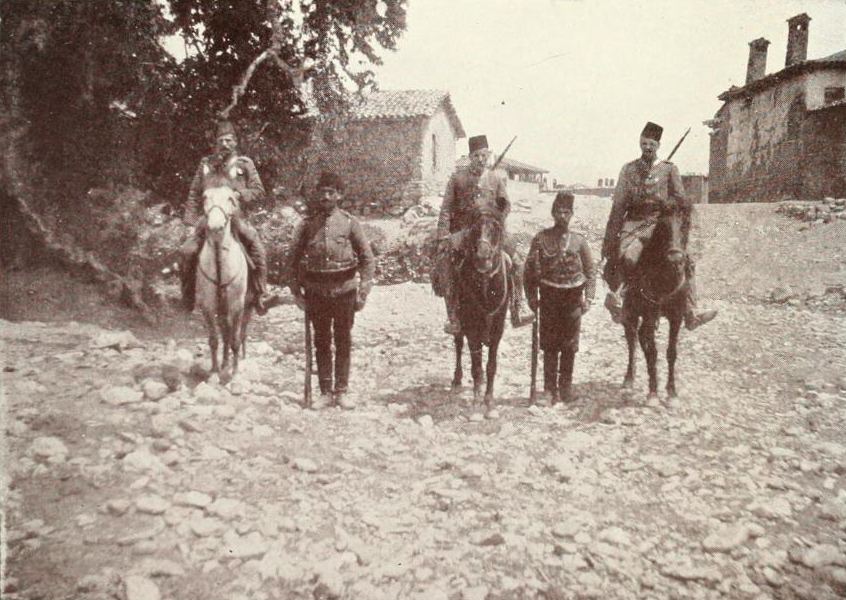
Ottoman Gendarmerie Cavalry in Macedonia.

=== Ottoman era ===
After the abolition of the Janissary corps of the Ottoman Empire in 1826, military organizations called Asâkir-i Muntazâma-i Mansûre, Asâkir-i Muntazâma-i Hâssa, and, in 1834, Asâkir-i Redîfe were established for security and public order in Anatolia and in some provinces of Rumelia.

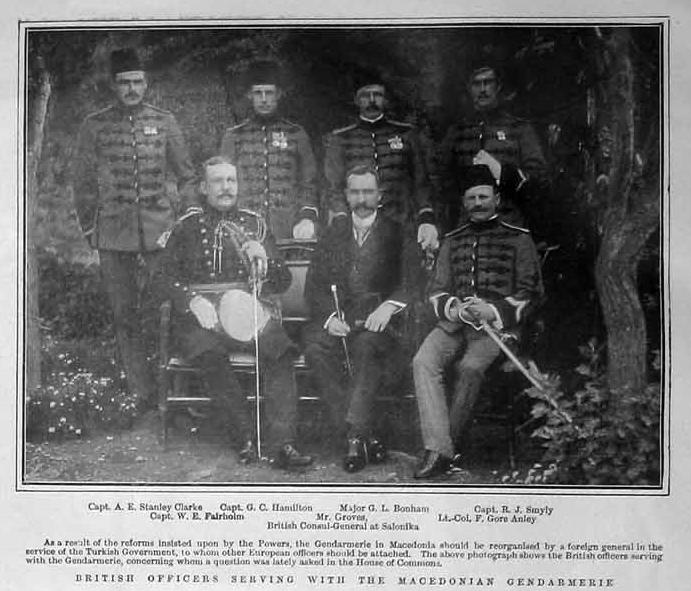
British officers in the Ottoman Gendarmerie, 1904

As the first use of the term Gendarmerie was in the Assignment Decrees published in the years following the 1839 Edict of Gülhane, it is assumed that the Gendarmerie organization was founded after that year, but the exact date of foundation has not yet been determined. Therefore, the date on which the name Asâkir-i Zaptiye Nizâmnâmesi was adopted, June 14, 1839, is usually considered the foundation date of the Turkish Gendarmerie.

After the 1877–1878 Russo-Turkish War, Ottoman prime minister Mehmed Said Pasha decided to bring police officers from Britain and France to establish a modern law enforcement organization. The Gendarmerie was used to great effect after the 1908 Young Turk Revolution, particularly in Rumelia. In 1909, the Gendarmerie was affiliated with the Ministry of War, and its name was changed to the Gendarmerie General Command (Ottoman Turkish: Umûm Jandarma Kumandanlığı).

Gendarmerie units continued their internal security duties as well as taking part in the conflict at various fronts as a part of the Armed Forces during World War I and the Turkish War of Independence.

=== Republic of Turkey ===
==== 20th century ====
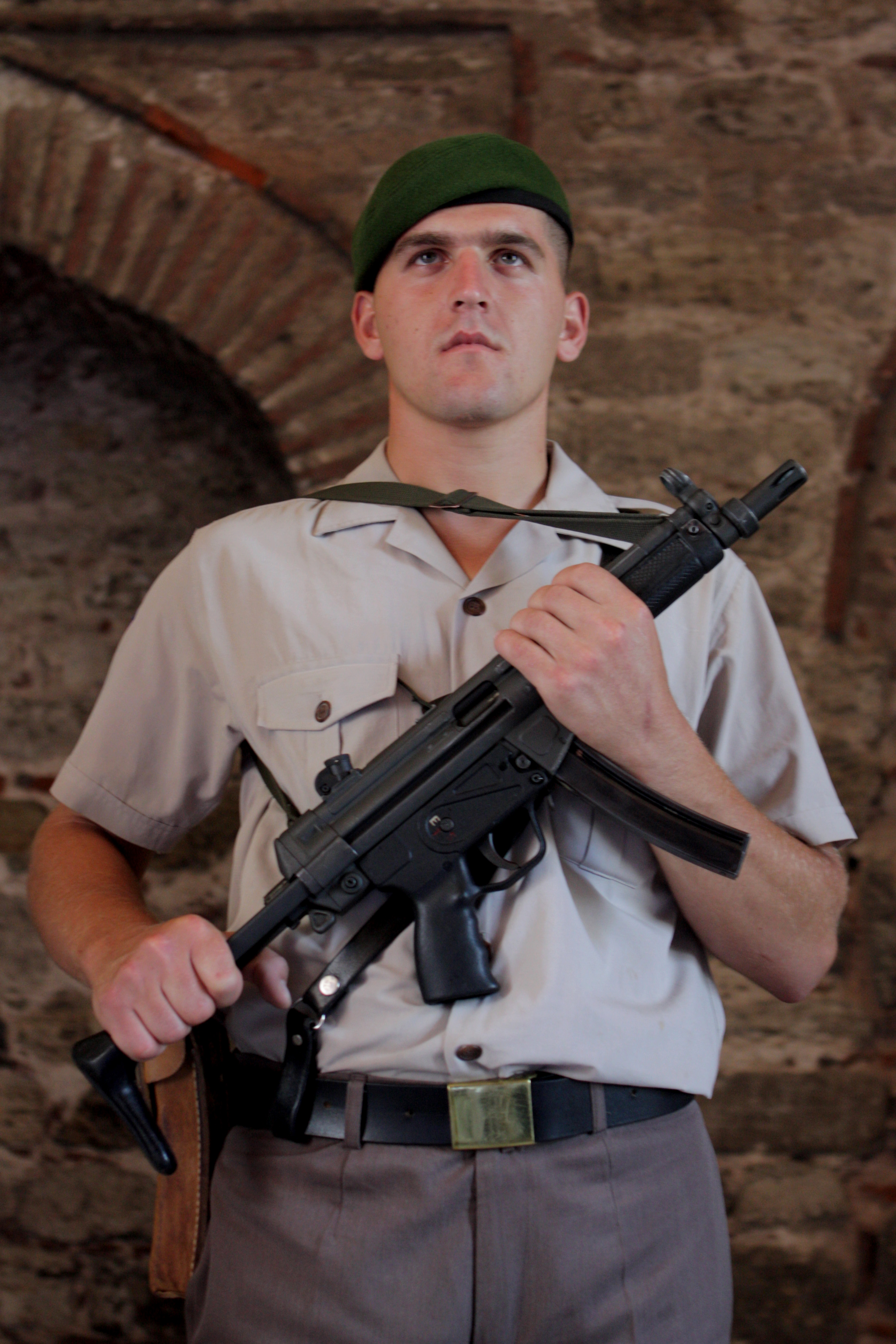
A Turkish conscript gendarme on guard at Topkapı Palace in Istanbul

The Gendarmerie organization achieved its current legal status on June 10, 1930. In 1939, the Gendarmerie organization was restructured, having three groups: Fixed Gendarmerie Units, Mobile Gendarmerie Units, and Gendarmerie Training Units and Schools.

In 1956, the Gendarmerie General Command was assigned the duties of protecting borders, coasts and territorial waters, and fighting smuggling, which had been previously carried out by the Gümrük Umum Kumandanlığı, under the Ministry of Customs and Monopoly. In 1957, Gendarmerie Border Units were transformed into brigades, and Gendarmerie Training Brigades were established.

In 1961, Gendarmerie Regional Commands were established. In 1968, the first Gendarmerie Aviation Unit was established in Diyarbakır under the name of Light Helicopter Company Command.

In 1974, Gendarmerie Commando Units and Gendarmerie Aviation Units took part in the Turkish military operations in Cyprus.

In 1988, the duty of protecting the land borders and ensuring their security was assigned to the Land Forces Command, but Gendarmerie General Command still holds the responsibility for some parts of the Iranian and Syrian borders and the whole Iraqi border.

The Gendarmerie Criminal Department was founded in Ankara in 1993 and from 1994, Gendarmerie Regional Criminal Laboratory Superiorities? were founded. Crime Scene Examination Teams, Explosive Material Disposal Units, Fingerprints and Palm Prints Branches and Crime Scene Examination Units were also established.

==== 21st century ====
In 2016, the Gendarmerie General Command was affiliated to the Ministry of Interior.

In 2018, Gendarmerie Special Operations participated in Operation Olive Branch, part of the Turkish involvement in the Syrian Civil War. According to the Syrian Observatory of Human Rights, Turkish Gendarmerie killed 500 Syrian civilians at the Turkish-Syrian border.

The Gendarmerie General Command currently has a total of 3,600 units, including 3,056 Internal Security Units, 218 Commando Units, 162 Prison Units, 160 Protection Units and four Aviation Units.

== Duties ==
The duties of the gendarmerie according to the Law No. 2803 on the Organization, Duties and Powers of the Gendarmerie; It is categorized under four main titles as judicial, military, civil and other duties.

=== Judicial duties ===
- Finding crimes and criminals,
- Capturing suspects,
- Transferring evidence judicial authorities,
- Conduct preparatory investigations when instructed to by the public prosecutor,
- Transporting prisoners between jails and courthouses.

=== Civil duties ===
- To ensure that the services for general safety and security are carried out in accordance with the relevant legislation,
- To carry out the services of informing the public about how to protect the society from public order crime, directing children and young people to crime and taking precautionary measures,
- To evaluate the information and statistics about public order crimes, to conduct or have an analysis of the crime and to determine the methods of combating crime to prevent public order crimes by evaluating them,
- Carrying out activities to prevent crime,
- Preventing, pursuing and investigating smuggling,
- External protection of penal institutions and detention centers.

=== Military duties ===
- To perform military services provided by law

=== Other duties ===
- These are duties other than judicial, military and civil duties, such as facility and personal protection and transport security, which must be carried out in accordance with laws and regulations, orders and decisions.

== Structure ==
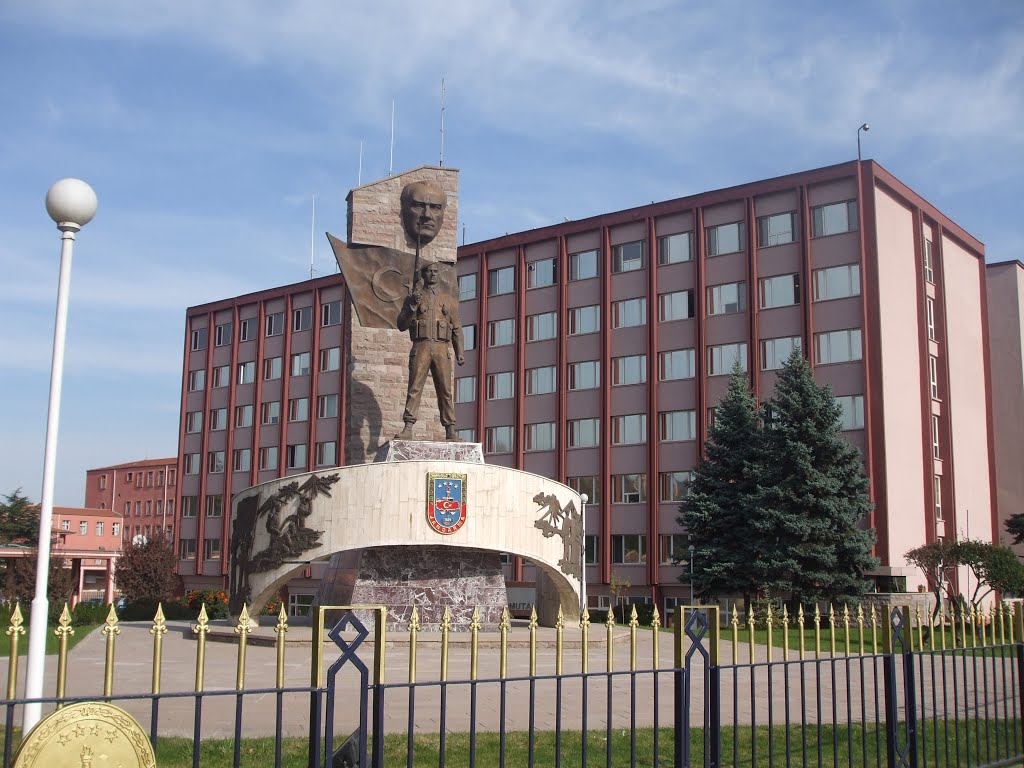
Gendarmerie General Command Headquarters

=== Commands ===
Gendarmerie General Command Headquarters (Ankara)

- Gendarmerie Security Corps Command (Van)
  - 23. Gendarmerie Border Division (Şırnak)
  - 21. Gendarmerie Border Brigade (Yüksekova)
  - 1. Gendarmerie Commando Brigade (Çakırsöğüt, Şırnak)
  - 2. Gendarmerie Commando Brigade (Bornova, İzmir)
- Gendarmerie Training Command (Ankara, İncek, Gölbaşı)
  - 1. Gendarmerie Training Battalion Command (Aydın)
  - 2. Gendarmerie Training Battalion Command (Bilecik)
  - 3. Gendarmerie Training Battalion Command (Ezine, Çanakkale)
  - 5. Gendarmerie Training Regiment Command (Gölköy, Kastamonu)
  - 6. Gendarmerie Commando Training Regiment Command (Kırkağaç, Manisa)
  - 7. Gendarmerie Commando Training Regiment Command (Yenifoça, İzmir)
  - Gendarmerie Combat Training Battalion Command (Seferihisar, İzmir)
  - Gendarmerie Transport Battalion Command (Söğüt, Bilecik)
  - 10. Gendarmerie Training Regiment Command (Bornova, İzmir)
  - 116. Gendarmerie Private Training Regiment Command (Çanakkale)
  - 121. Gendarmerie Training Regiment Command (Serinyol, Antakya)
  - 125. Gendarmerie Training Regiment Command (Safranbolu, Karabük)
  - Işıklar Gendarmerie NCO High School (Bursa) ( was established in 1845 as "Mekteb-i Fünun-u İdadi"')
  - Gendarmerie Horse and Dog Training Center Command (Nevşehir) (JAKEM)
- Gendarmerie Logistics Command (Güvercinlik, Ankara)
- Gendarmerie Aviation Command (Güvercinlik, Ankara)
  - Gendarmerie UAV Command (Elazığ)
- Gendarmerie Special Public Security Command (JÖAK)
  - Gendarmerie Special Operations (JÖH)
  - Gendarmerie Search and Rescue Battalion Command (JAK)
  - Gendarmerie Underwater Search and Rescue Teams (SAK)
  - Gendarmerie Public Security Boat Commands (Security and public order services at inland waters are carried out by the Gendarmerie Public Order Boat Commands.)
- Village guards
- Prison Gendarmerie Division Commands (There are garrison stations appointed in every prison)
- The Gendarmerie Band Command

=== Criminal units ===
- Provincial Gendarmerie Commands in 81 provinces & in 388 districts.
  - The Crime Scene Investigation Teams (CSIT) (Working under the Provincial and District Gendarmerie Commands systematically examine the crime scene by means of technical and scientific methods; properly gather physical evidences; pack and send them to forensic laboratories.)
  - Explosive Ordnance Disposal Teams ( which have been established in tourism regions, regions with a concentration of terror incidents and big cities, dispose of explosive ordnances.)
  - Crime scene investigation units
  - Anti-Smuggling and Organized Crime Department (ASOCD)
- Gendarmerie Intelligence Organization

=== Other units ===
- Gendarmerie Traffic Teams
  - The Gendarmerie Motorcycled Public Order Teams (Round-the-clock at the highways established by the protocols in the responsibility areas of the Gendarmerie General Command.)
- Gendarmerie Dog Teams
- Gendarmerie Environmental Protection Teams (Environmental Protection Teams have been established in order to protect environment, ecological balance and natural life, to protect living species and areas protected by national legislation and international conventions and to prevent environmental pollution.)
- The Gendarmerie Mounted Units (Used in performing patrolling services at resort areas, forestlands, recreation spots and museums (Topkapı Palace), and in performing preventive law enforcement services.)

== Jurisdiction ==
The Gendarmerie General Command has jurisdiction over 93 percent of Turkey's territory, focusing on rural and border areas, and serves approximately 20 percent of the population. The remaining areas fall under the jurisdiction of the police department.

Led by a four-star general and organized into multiple commands, the Gendarmerie comprises nearly 195,218 to 200,000 personnel. It plays a central role in maintaining security in rural regions that are often targeted by criminal groups for smuggling, human and drug trafficking.

The Gendarmerie is a member of the NATO Stability Policing Centre of Excellence (NATO SP COE) and the International Association of Gendarmeries and Police Forces with Military Status (FIEP).

== Ranks ==
=== Officers ===
NATO code	OF-10	OF-9	OF-8	OF-7	OF-6	OF-5	OF-4	OF-3	OF-2	OF-1
Turkish Gendarmerie
Turkish Gendarmerie		Orgeneral	Korgeneral	Tümgeneral	Tuğgeneral	Albay	Yarbay	Binbaşı	Yüzbaşı	Üsteğmen	Teğmen	Asteğmen

=== Other Ranks ===
NATO code	OR-9	OR-8	OR-7	OR-6	OR-5		OR-4			OR-3	OR-2	OR-1
Turkish Gendarmerie
Turkish Gendarmerie	Astsubay kıdemli başçavuş	Astsubay başçavuş	Astsubay kıdemli üstçavuş	Astsubay üstçavuş	Astsubay kıdemli çavuş	Astsubay çavuş	Uzman Jandarma Kademeli Çavuş	I. Kıdemli Uzman Çavuş	Uzman Çavuş	Uzman onbaşı

== The Gendarmerie Museum ==
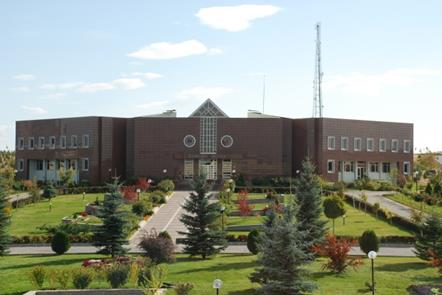
Museum

The Gendarmerie Museum is established in order to reflect the developments in periodical order beginning with the foundation of the Gendarmerie organization; to exhibit its activities, heroic deeds, services in the history; to protect all kinds of military cultural assets related to the Gendarmerie by collecting them and to transfer them to the future generations.

The Gendarmerie Museum in the Beytepe Lieutenant General İsmail SELEN Quarters in Ankara and is open to public.

== Equipment ==
Model	Origin	Type	References
Canik TP9	Turkey	Semi-automatic pistol	
Sarsilmaz SAR 9	Turkey	Semi-automatic pistol	
Glock 19	Austria	Semi-automatic pistol	
Sarsılmaz Cobra & Baba	Turkey	Shotgun	
Armsan RS-A2	Turkey	Shotgun	
SPAS-12	Italy	Shotgun	
Heckler & Koch MP5	West Germany	Submachine gun	
IMI Micro Uzi	Israel	Submachine gun	
SAR 109T	Turkey	Submachine gun	
FN P90	Belgium	Submachine gun	
AKM	Soviet Union	Rifle	
Galil MAR	Israel	Rifle	
Heckler & Koch G3	West Germany	Rifle	
HK G41	West Germany	Rifle	
HK33A4	West Germany	Rifle	
MKE MPT	Turkey	Rifle	
KCR-556	Turkey	Rifle	
M16A1	United States	Rifle	
M4A1	United States	Rifle	
Accuracy International AW	United Kingdom	Rifle	
Heckler & Koch G28	Germany	Rifle	
IMI Galatz	Israel	Rifle	
LMT MWS 308	United States	Rifle	
McMillan M87R	United States	Rifle	
McMillan Tac-50	United States	Rifle	
MKEK JNG-90	Turkey	Rifle	
Robar RC-50	United States	Rifle	
SR-25	United States	Rifle	
SVD	Soviet Union	Rifle	
Canik M2 QCB	United States	Machine gun	
FN MAG	Belgium	Machine gun	
HK23E	West Germany	Machine gun	
KMG556	Turkey	Machine gun	
SAR 762 MT	Turkey	Machine gun	
M249 SAW	United States	Machine gun	
MG3	West Germany	Machine gun	
PKM	Soviet Union	Machine gun	
RPK	Soviet Union	Machine gun	
AK-40GL	Turkey	Grenade launcher	
Kale KGL40	Turkey	Grenade launcher	
MKEK 40mm	Turkey	Grenade launcher	
MKEK T40	Turkey	Grenade launcher	
HK 69	Germany	Grenade launcher	
HK 79	Germany	Grenade launcher	
M203	United States	Grenade launcher	
Mk 19	United States	Grenade launcher	
Milkor M32A1	South Africa	Grenade launcher	
RPG-7	Soviet Union	Grenade launcher	
M19	United States	Mortar	
M29	United States	Mortar	
Mortier 120mm Rayé Tracté Modèle F1	France	Mortar	
Aselsan Alkar	Turkey	Mortar	
JARMOL	Turkey	Directed energy weapon	
ASELSAN IHTAR KARTAL-2	Turkey	Anti-drone system	
COŞKUN	Turkey	EOD robot	
ASLAN	Turkey	Medium class UGV with integrated AVAZ long-range sonic weapon	

=== Vehicles and Aerial vehicles ===
Model	Image	Origin/Assembly	Type	Variant	Quantity	Details
Patrol vehicles
TOGG		Turkey	Electric Patrol vehicle	SUV	N/A	
BMC Tulga		Turkey	Armoured patrol vehicle	SUV		Expected to enter the inventory of Gendarmerie 2025.It will be produced 300 in total.
Isuzu D-Max		Japan Turkey	Patrol vehicle	Pick-up	N/A	
Dacia Duster		France Romania Turkey	Patrol vehicle	SUV	N/A	
Fiat Egea		Italy Turkey	Patrol vehicle	Sedan	50	
Fiat Doblo		Italy Turkey	Patrol vehicle	Bus	50	
Renault Megane		France Turkey	Traffic patrol vehicle	Sedan	N/A	
Renault Fluence		France Turkey	Traffic patrol vehicle	Sedan	N/A	
Toyota Corolla		Japan Turkey	Traffic patrol vehicle	Sedan	N/A	
Mitsubishi Triton		Japan Turkey	Traffic patrol vehicle	Pick-up	N/A	
Nissan Navara		Japan Turkey	Traffic patrol vehicle	Pick-up	N/A	
Ford Ranger		United States Turkey	Patrol vehicle	Pick-up	N/A	
Ford Transit Custom		United States Turkey	Patrol vehicle	Van	N/A	
Ford Transit		United States Turkey	Patrol vehicle	Van	N/A	
Honda Africa Twin		Japan Turkey	Patrol Motorbike	CRF1000L	N/A	
BMW R1200		Germany Turkey	Patrol Motorbike	R1200 GS	N/A	
Armoured vehicles
Sisu Nasu		Finland	Tracked All-Terrain Vehicle	NA-140 BT	47	
BMC Kirpi		Turkey	MRAP	Kirpi Kirpi II	200 200	Integrated JARMOL Directed energy weapon on Kirpi 1. It can be combined with IHTAR KARTAL-2 anti-drone system.
BMC Vuran		Turkey	MRAP	Vuran 4x4 Vuran Alkar	240	BMC Vuran armored vehicle with Mobile Adjustable Ramp System. The Gendarmerie took delivery of the VURAN vehicles mounted on the ALKAR 120mm Mortar Weapon System. Mobile mortar capability will be gained with ALKAR-mounted VURAN vehicles.
Nurol Ejder		Turkey	MRAP	Ejder Yalçın 4x4	200	
Katmerciler Hızır		Turkey	MRAP		57	Border patrol vehicle.
Otokar Cobra		Turkey	Infantry Mobility Vehicle	Cobra I Cobra II	200 100	
Otokar Ural	-	Turkey	Armoured patrol vehicle		N/A	
Otokar Akrep		Turkey	Armoured Patrol vehicle	Akrep I	100	
FNSS PARS		Turkey	Armoured fighting vehicle	PARS SCOUT	0/5	Expected delivery of 5 AFV.
TOMA		Turkey	Armoured vehicle		N/A	Community Incident Intervention Vehicle.
Dragoon		United States	Amphibious Armoured fighting vehicle	Dragoon 300	150	
Engineering vehicle
MEMATT	-	Turkey	Demining vehicle		2	
Aircraft
Beechcraft Super King Air		United States	Light transport/ Reconnaissance aircraft	B350ISR	3	3 B350ISR are leased. Used by Gendarmerie Aviation Command
Cessna C-680		United States	Light transport aircraft	C-680	1	3 B350ISR are leased. Used by Gendarmerie Aviation Command
AQUILA A212		Germany	Light aircraft/Trainer aircraft	A212	1	New variant in use.
TAI Hürkuş		Turkey	Light attack	Hürkuş-C		Planned acquisition.
Helicopters
TAI/AgustaWestland T129 ATAK		Turkey Italy	Attack helicopter	T-129B	16	23 in total planned.
Sikorsky-S70 Black Hawk		United States Turkey	Medium Transport/Utility helicopter	S-70A-D28	12	Avionics upgraded by ASELSAN.
Sikorsky-S70 Black Hawk		United States Turkey	Medium Transport/Utility helicopter	S-70i	2	
Sikorsky-S70 Black Hawk		United States Turkey	Medium Transport/Utility helicopter	T-70	5/33	33 T-70 ordered.
TAI T625 Gökbey		Turkey	Light Transport/Utility Helicopter	T625	5	It will replace UH-1 Huey helicopters.
UH-1 Huey		United States	Utility helicopter/Transport	AB-205A	10	Avionics upgraded by ASELSAN.
Mil Mi-17		Russia	Transport/Utility helicopter	Mi-17 IVA	18	Avionics upgraded by ASELSAN. Upgraded with night vision system.
Gyrocopter
Autogyro Cavalon		Germany	Reconnaissance/Surveillance		3	6 more planned.
Unmanned Aerial Vehicles
TAI Anka		Turkey	UCAV	Anka S	8	Elazig Gendarmerie UAV command
Bayraktar TB2		Turkey	UCAV	TB2	18	
Bayraktar Akınıcı		Turkey	UCAV		3	
STM KARGU		Turkey	Loitering munition	Kargu-2	N/A	
Baykar Bayraktar Mini		Turkey	Miniature UAV	C	N/A	
UÇBEY	-	Turkey	VTOL UAV		N/A	
Black Hornet Nano		Norway	Micro-UAV	PD-100 Black Hornet	N/A	

Additional info : Gendarmerie also acquired 130 basic and 5 professional Micro UAV systems.

Planned acquisition : Planned acquisition of new liaison and utility aircraft. Planned acquisition of 10 + 5 optional training aircraft.

=== Surface Combatant ===
Boat
Name	Origin	Quantity	Type	Details
ASBOT KN-35	Turkey	10	Security Boat	ASBOT KN-35 boats were designed and developed by ASFAT A.Ş. for the units belonging to the Gendarmerie General Command.

=== Retired/Reserve ===
Vehicles :

- Akrep - 250+
- Condor - 25
- BTR-60 - 180
- BTR-80 - 295

Aircraft :

- Cessna O-1E Bird Dog
- Dornier Do-28D

Helicopters :

- Bell 212
- Bell 206

== Gallery ==
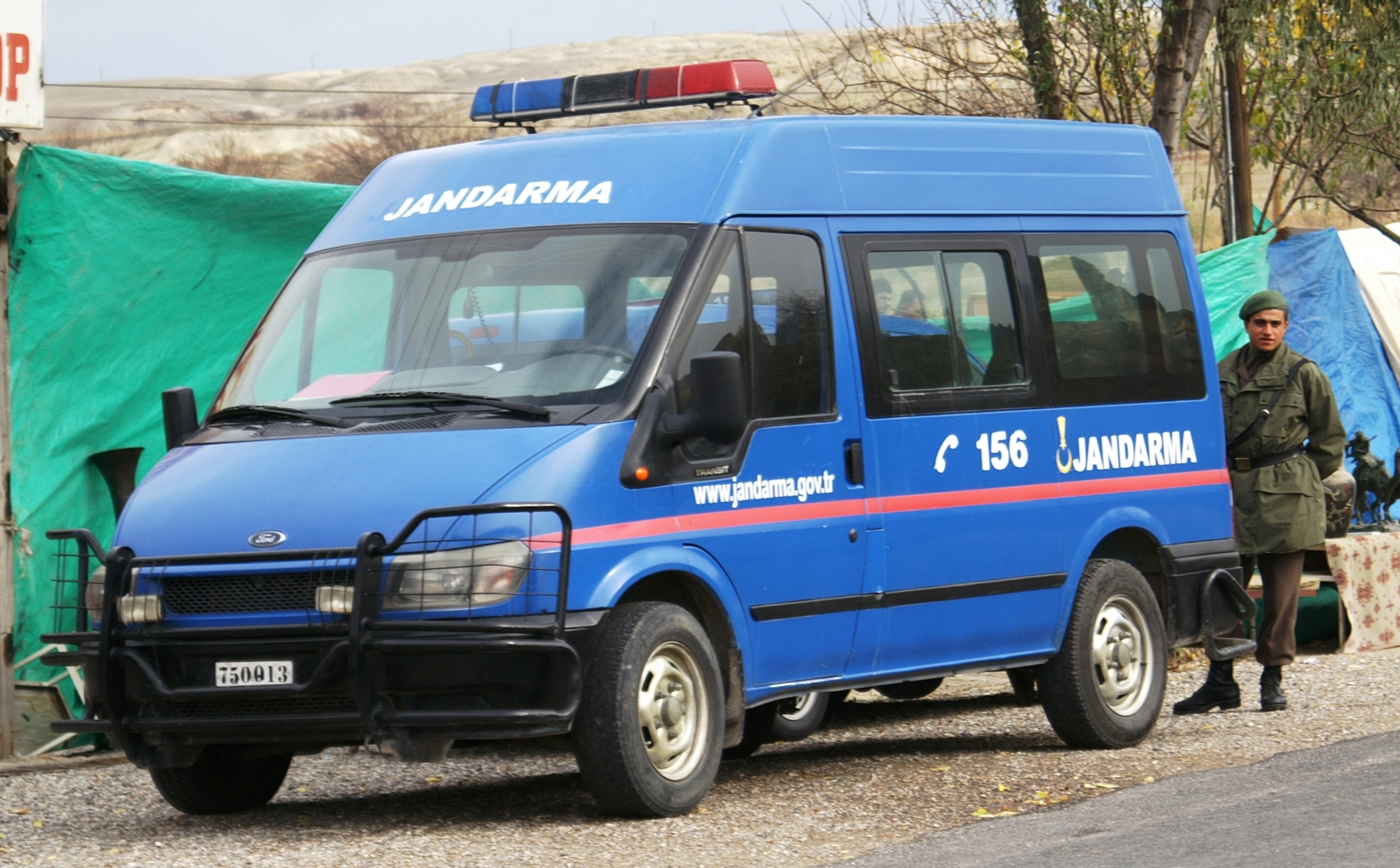
Gendarmerie's Ford Transit and a trooper

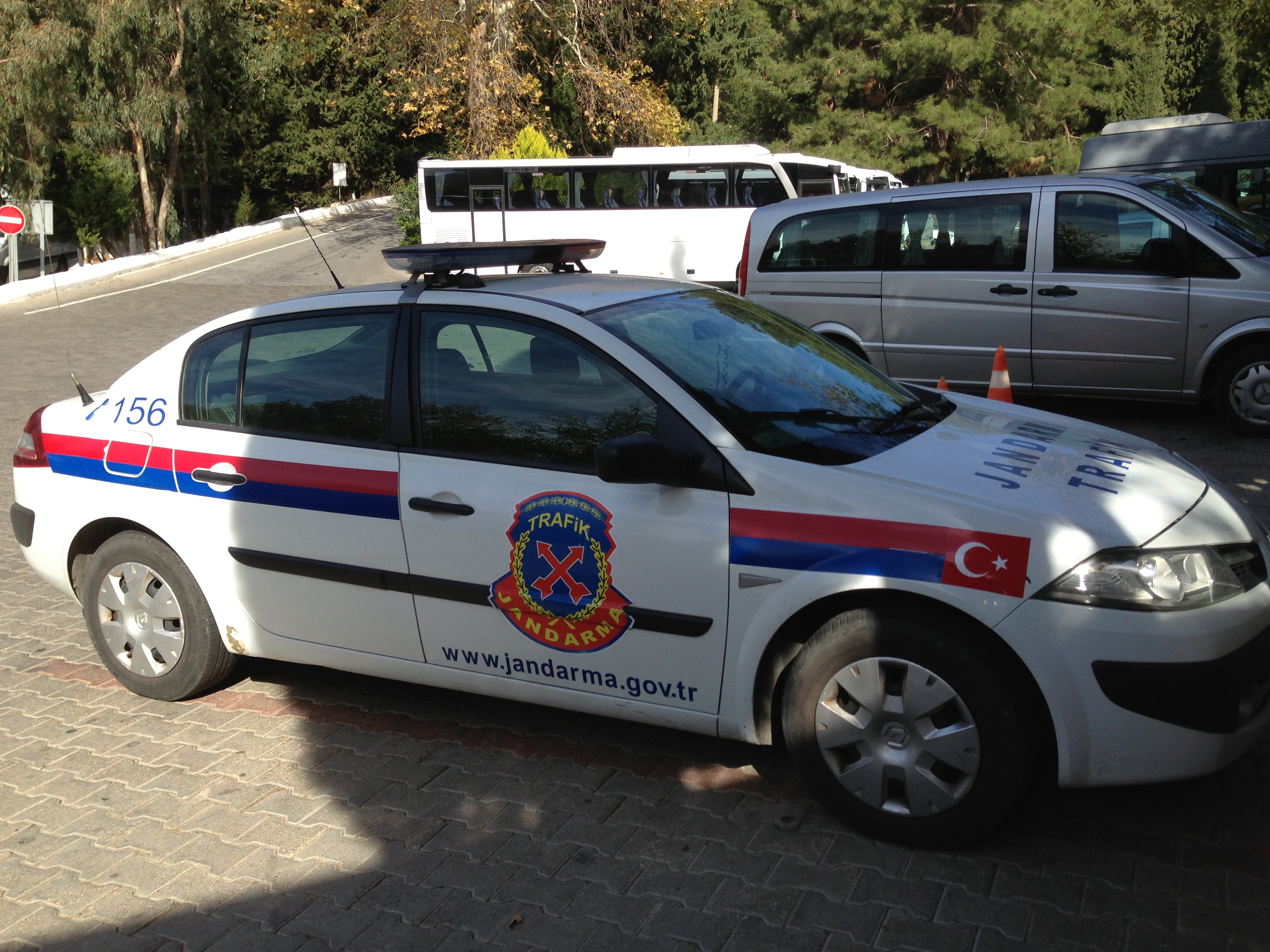
Traffic gendarmerie's Renault Megane

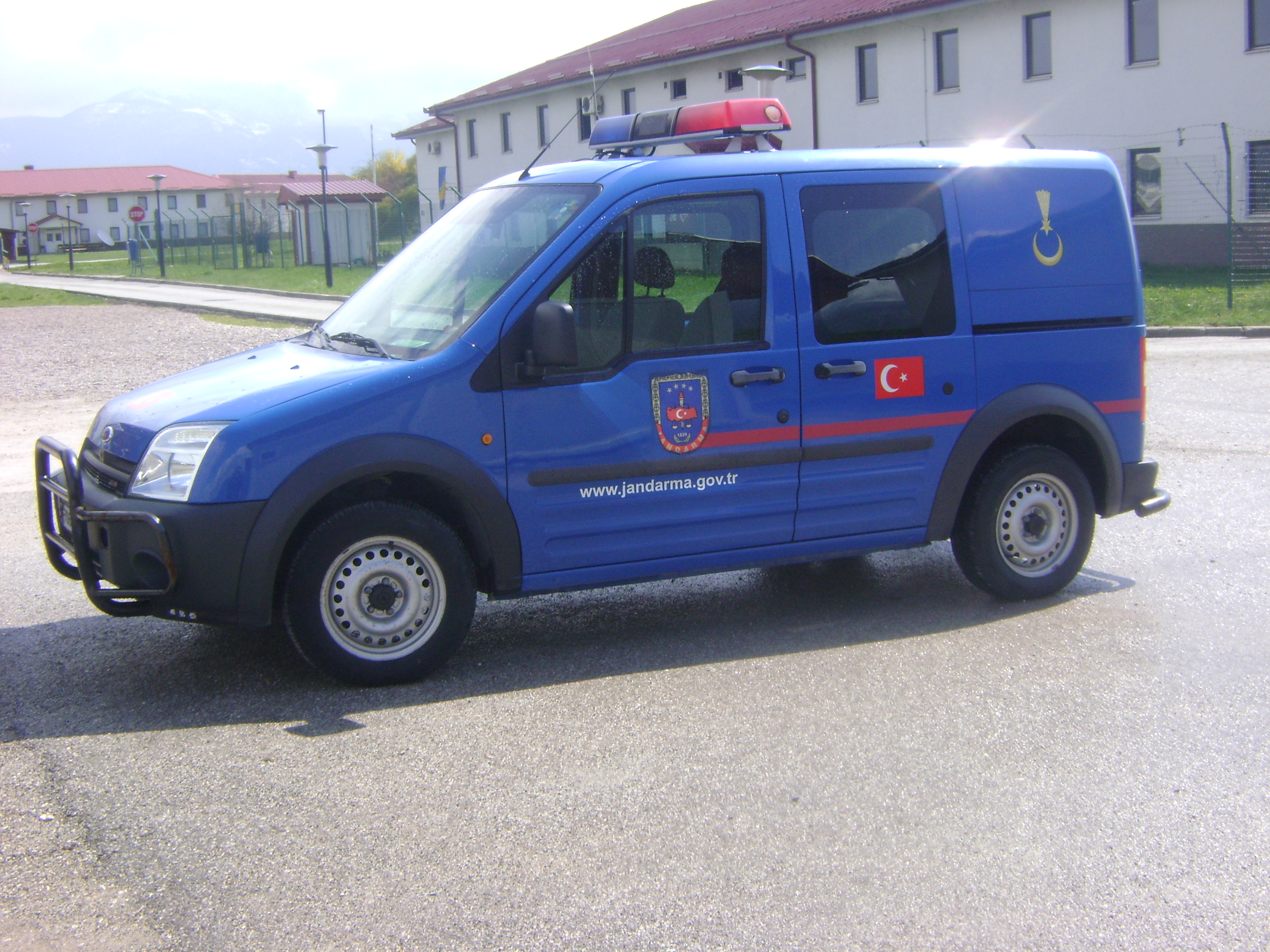
Gendarmerie interceptor

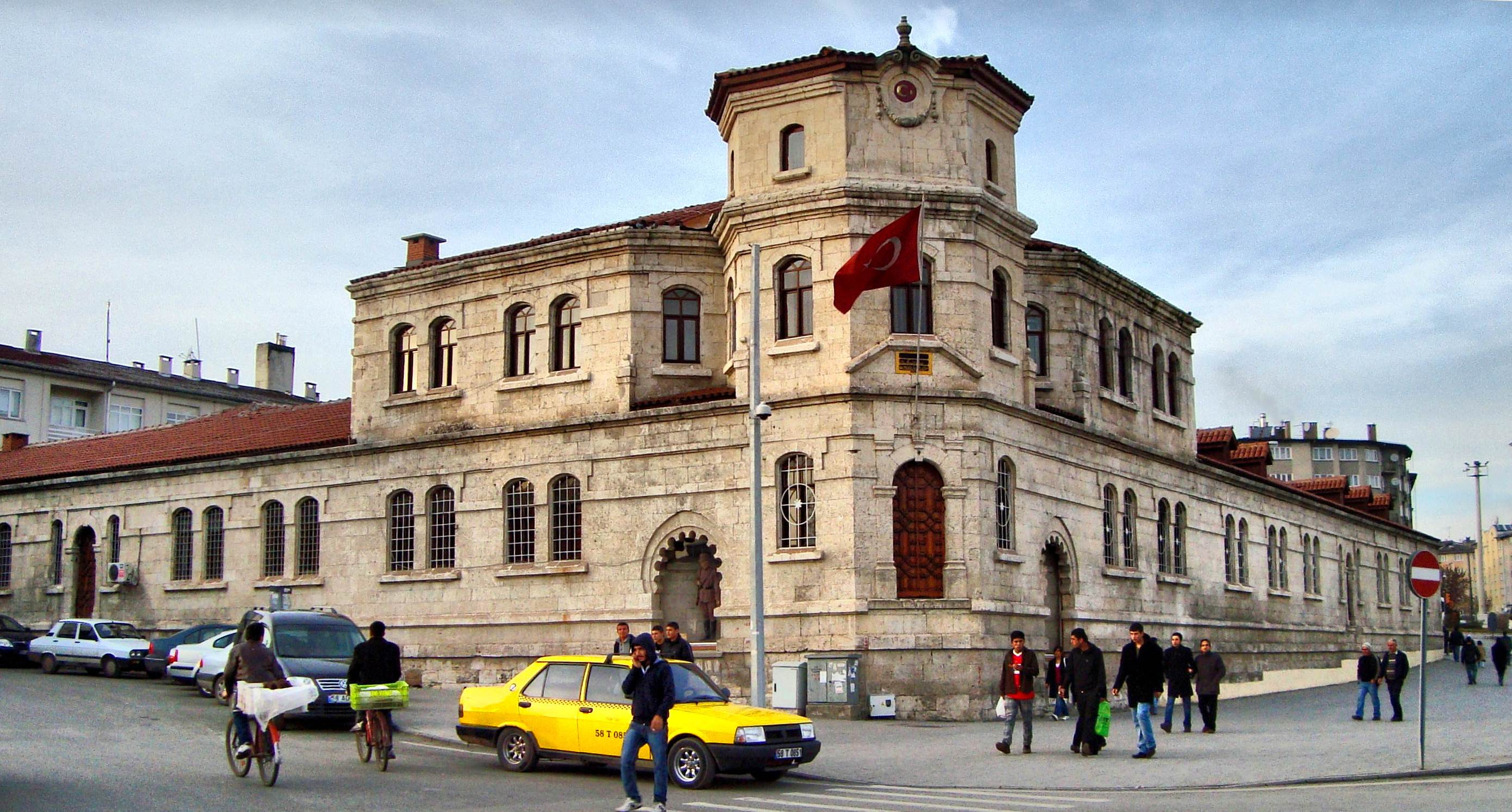
Jandarma Barracks in Sivas built in 1908

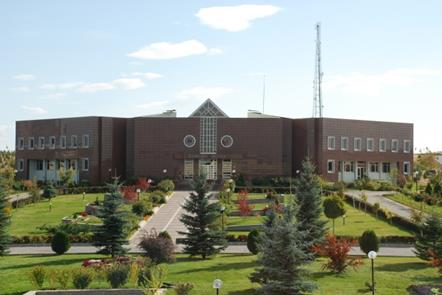
Gendarmerie museum

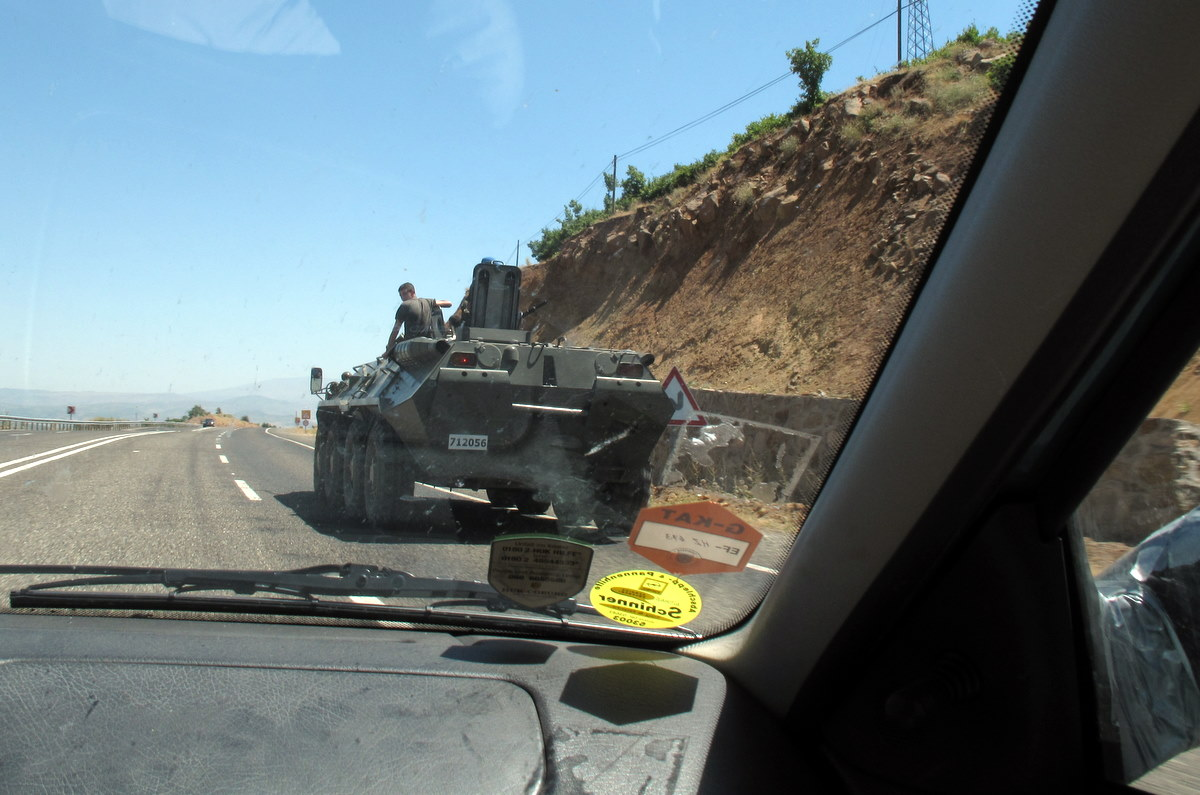
BTR-80 in the gendarmerie inventory

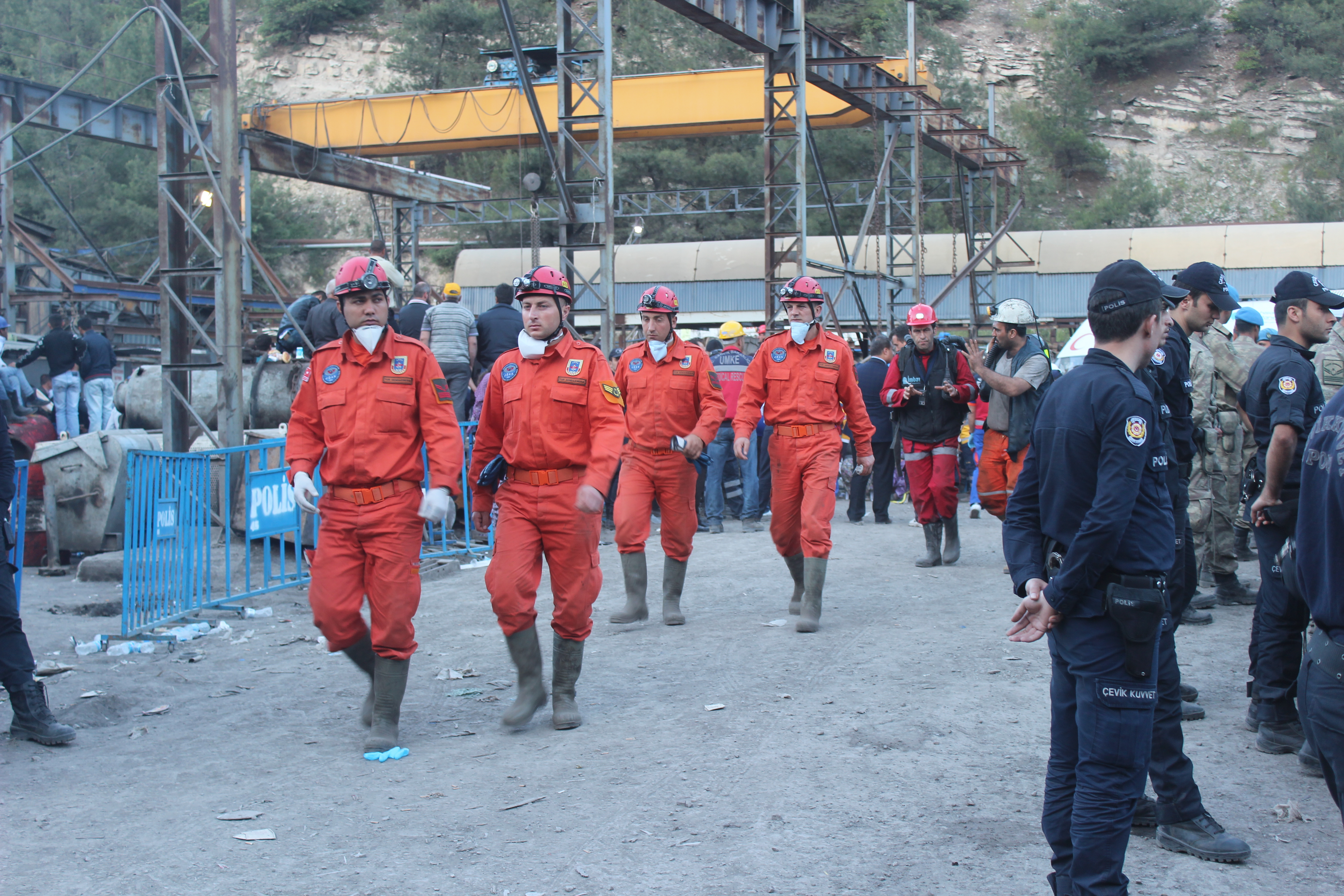
Gendarmerie Search and Rescue Battalion Command teams during Soma mine disaster

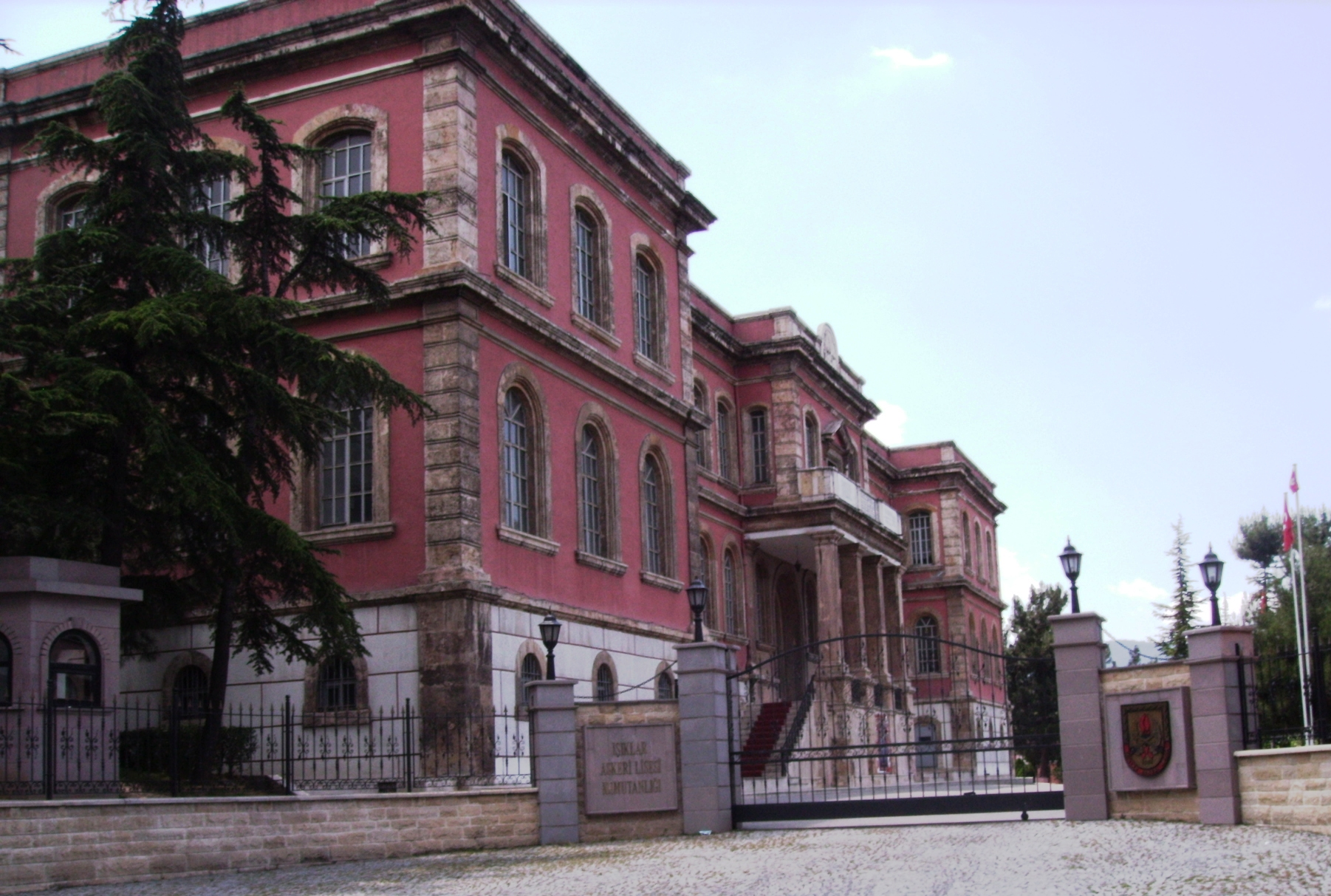
Işıklar Gendarmerie NCO Vocational School

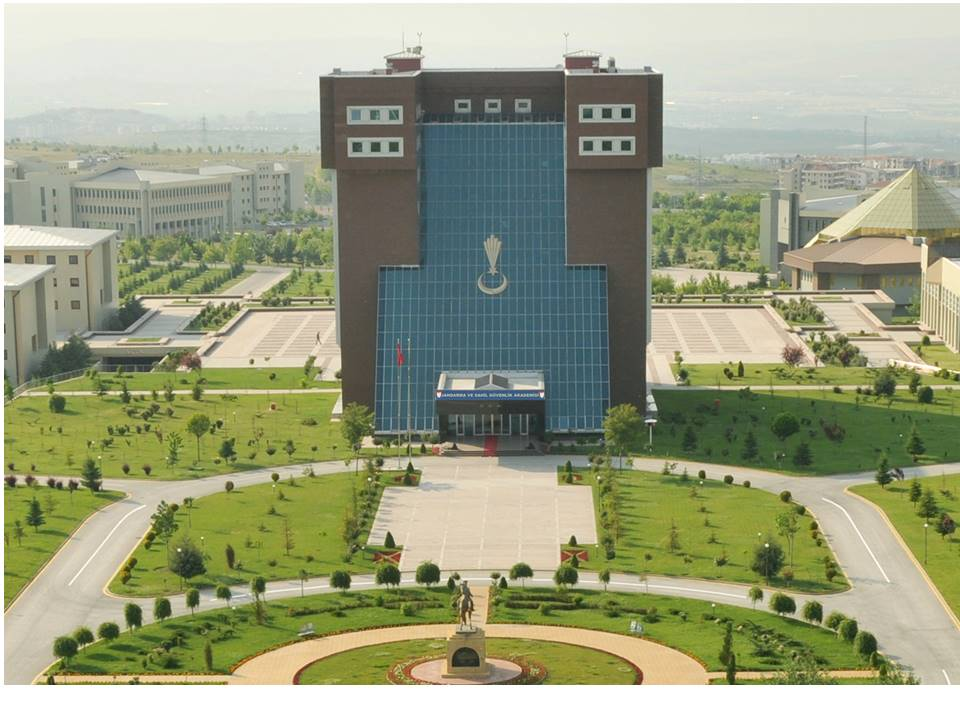
Gendarmerie and Coast Guard Academy

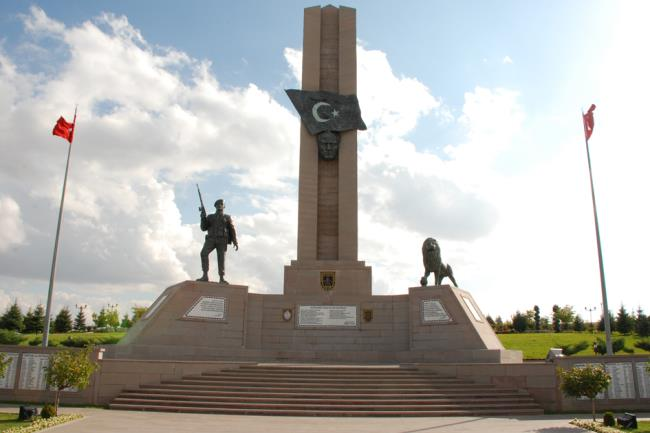
Gendarmerie Martyrs' Memorial

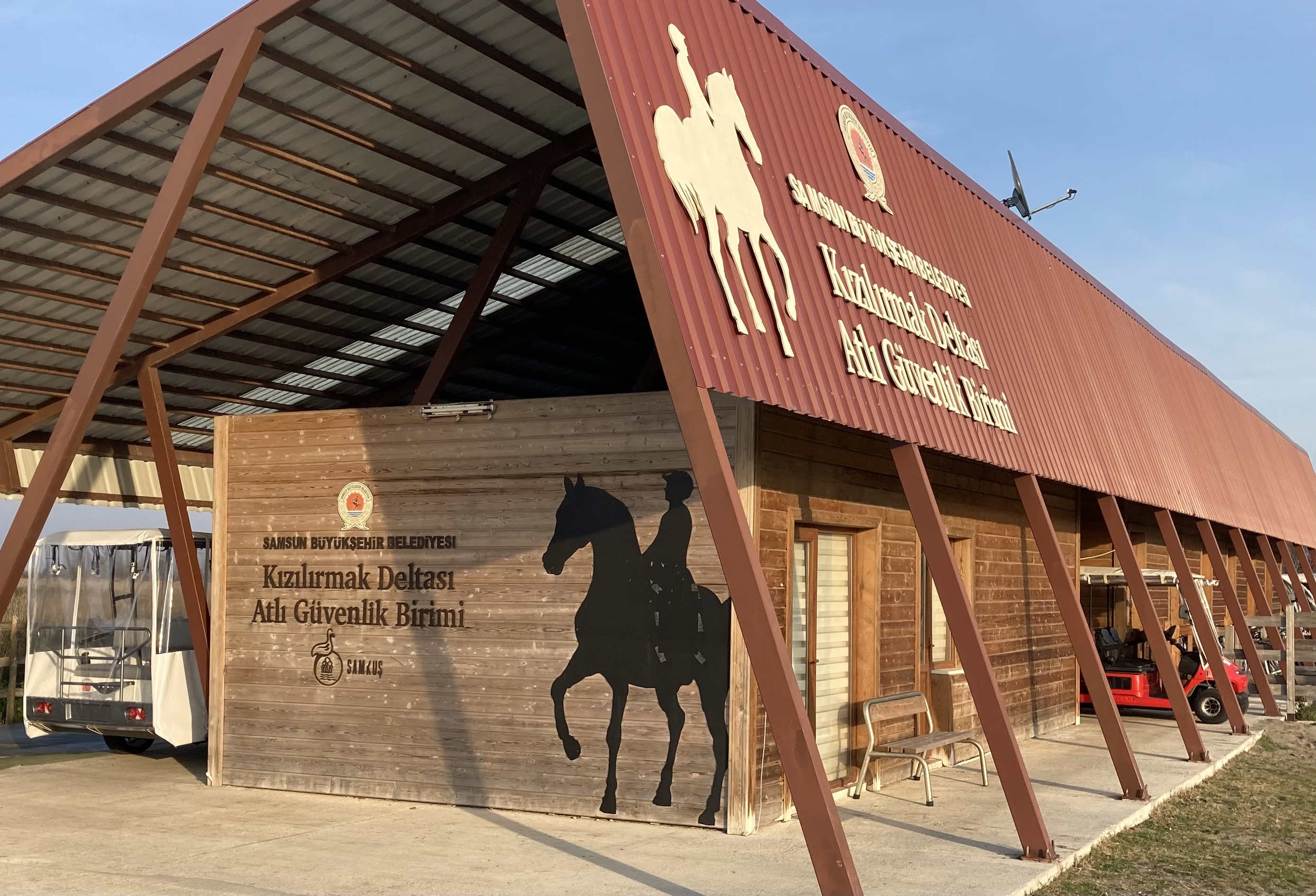
The Kızılırmak Delta is guarded by the mounted gendarme team

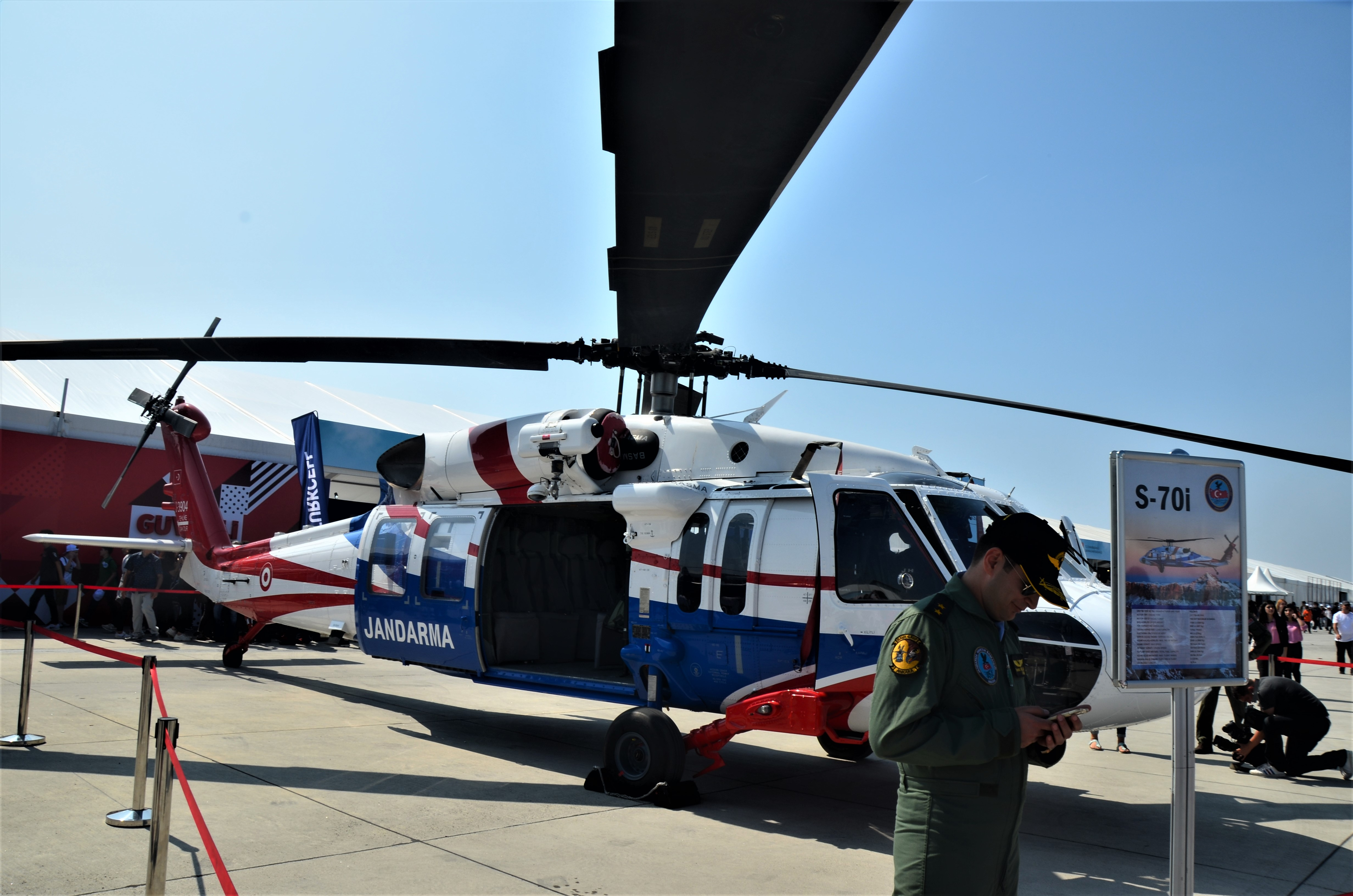
Sikorsky S-70i helicopter of the Turkish Gendarmerie

== See also ==
- Constabulary
- Gendarmerie
- List of firefighting equipment of Turkey
