= Air Force Search and Rescue =

Unit of the Turkish Air Force

Air Force Search and Rescue (Turkish: Personel kurtarma - AKİP) is unit of the Turkish Air Force whose task is to recover civilian and other military personnel. The difference between Combat Search and Rescue (Turkish Armed Forces) MAK & Air Force Search and Rescue Personnel is mainly for civil and domestic personnel. Gendarmerie General Command It has its own unit gendarmerie search and rescue (JAK). Air Force Search and Rescue Personnel have the number of which very little in comparison to other Search and Rescue teams in Turkey. Generally, its air force's own team.
