= Kale KCR =

Turkish assault rifle

KCR-556
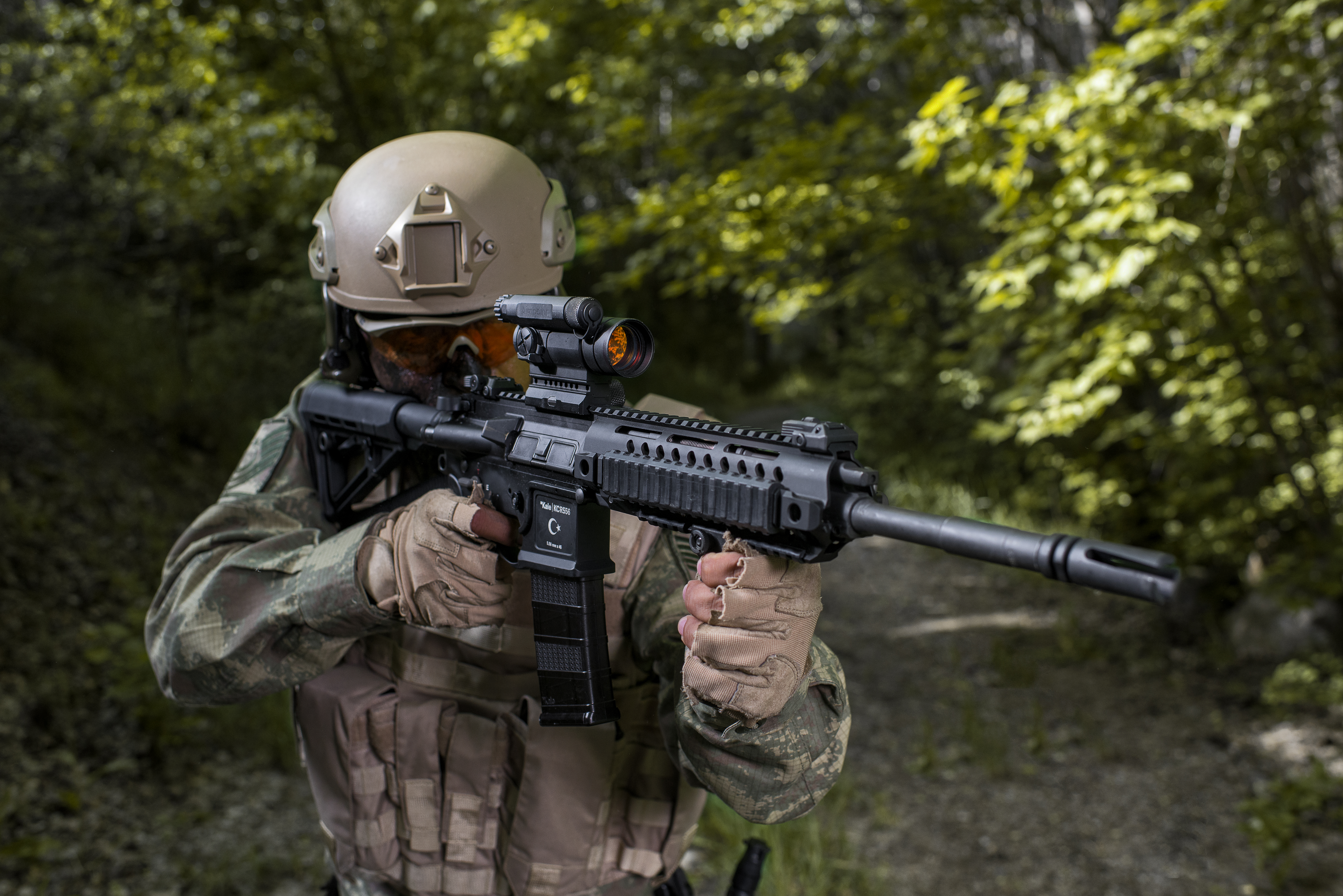
- Type: Assault rifle
- Place of origin: Turkey

Service history
- Used by: See users
- Wars: Operation Olive Branch; Operation Spring Shield

Production history
- Designed: 2017
- Manufacturer: KALEKALIP
- Produced: 2018-Present
- No. built: 50,000+
- Variants: KCR762, KMR762

Specifications
- Mass: 3,3kg (with 30 round magazine)
- Length: 655mm
- Barrel length: 368mm, 280mm, 190mm versions available
- Cartridge: 5.56×45mm NATO
- Caliber: 5.56 mm (.223 in)
- Rate of fire: 950 round/min
- Effective firing range: 500 meters, depends on barrel length
- Maximum firing range: 850 meters, depends on barrel length
- Feed system: STANAG magazine
- Sights: Iron sights or various optics

The Kale KCR 556 is a Turkish assault rifle developed by Kale Kalıp. It fires 5.56×45 mm NATO ammunition.

== Design ==
The modular gun is an advanced gas-operated rifle with rotating bolt head and piston op-rod driven fixed gas system. It is suitable for ambidextrous use. It has a maintenance free gas system up to 10,000 rounds which minimizes fouling and heat. The chrome plated cold hammer forged barrel is free floating. The gun is quite ergonomic with its modular flip-up iron sight and five-position telescopic adjustable stock.

The gun's length is 655 mm (25.8 in) when the stock is extended. It is made in 3 barrel length options, 368mm (14.5 in) 280mm (11 in) and 190 mm (7.5 in). The gun weighs 2,630 grams (93 oz) excluding the magazine.

== Users ==
- Brazil
- Libya
- Northern Cyprus
  - Security Forces Command
- Qatar
- Turkey
  - Gendarmerie General Command
    - Gendarmerie Special Public Security Command
    - Gendarmerie Special Operations
  - Coast Guard Command (Turkey)
- Syria - Used by Internal Security Command.
