= Gendarmerie Special Public Security Command =

Police tactical arm of the Turkish Gendarmerie General Command

Jandarma Özel Asayiş Komutanlığı
- Country: Turkey
- Branch: Gendarmerie General Command
- Type: Police tactical unit
- Role: Domestic Counter-Terrorism and Law Enforcement
- Size: Varies
- Part of: Respective municipality-level gendarmerie departments

The Gendarmerie Special Public Security Command (Turkish: Jandarma Özel Asayiş Komutanlığı) or JÖAK, is the police tactical unit of the Gendarmerie General Command. It has several missions which include counter-terrorist actions, underwater operations, hostage rescue, riot control, and other high-threat criminal actions. Members of the unit receive extensive training at the Jandarma School at Foça and also from selected Army instructors. All teams companies work under the direction of the police and gendarmerie regions to which they are assigned, but can also receive tasking from the Jandarma Headquarters in Ankara.

== Equipment ==
=== Handguns ===
- Beretta 92
- Glock 19

=== Submachine Guns ===
- FN P90
- HK MP5A3
- HK MP5K

=== Assault Rifles ===
- M4A1 Kale KCR556

=== Sniper Rifles ===
- SR-25
- Armalite M-15T(4)
- IMI Galatz
- Accuracy International AWM
- MKEK JNG-90
- Robar RC-50
- PSL (rifle)

=== Shotguns ===
- Franchi SPAS-12
