= Aquila A 211 =

German light aircraft

A 211
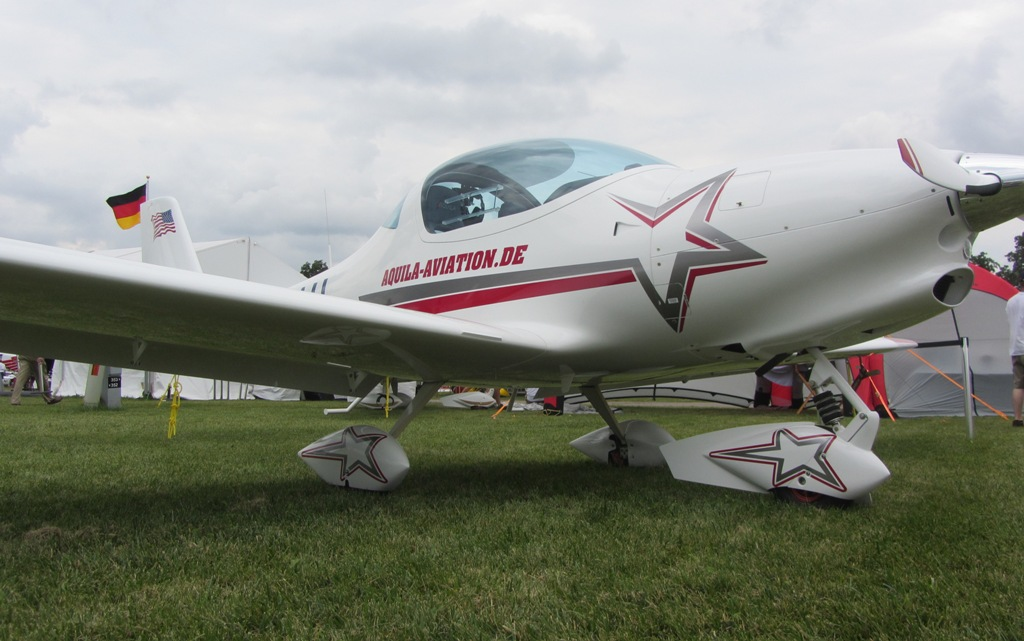

General information
- Type: Light aircraft
- National origin: Germany
- Manufacturer: Aquila Aviation

History
- First flight: 2000
- Developed from: Aquila A 210

The Aquila A 211 is a German, two seat side-by-side configuration light aircraft, built by Aquila Aviation.

== Design and development ==
The A 211 is the follow on to the A 210. The A 211 is a low wing, side by side seating, single engine aircraft with tricycle landing gear. The aircraft is certified under German/EASA Part 21.17 rules. The A 211 is similar to the Aquila A 210 but has a revised spinner, cowling and canopy.

It will cease to be produced in August 2026.

== Variants ==
Aquila A 210
Earlier model
Aquila A 211
Conventional instrument panel
Aquila A 211GX
Glass cockpit model

== Specifications (A 211) ==
Data from Manufacturer

General characteristics

- Crew: one
- Capacity: one passenger
- Length: 7.4 m (24 ft 3 in)
- Wingspan: 10.3 m (33 ft 10 in)
- Height: 2.4 m (7 ft 10 in)
- Wing area: 10.5 m^{2} (113 sq ft)
- Empty weight: 520 kg (1,146 lb)
- Max takeoff weight: 750 kg (1,653 lb)
- Fuel capacity: 120 litres (26 imp gal; 32 US gal)
- Powerplant: 1 × Rotax 912S horizontally opposed piston aircraft engine, 73.5 kW (98.6 hp)
- Propellers: 2-bladed MT-Propeller constant-speed MTV-21-A/175-05

Performance

- Maximum speed: 266 km/h (165 mph, 143 kn)
- Cruise speed: 210 km/h (130 mph, 110 kn)
- Range: 990 km (620 mi, 530 nmi)
- Service ceiling: 4,400 m (14,500 ft)
- Rate of climb: 3.8 m/s (750 ft/min)
- Wing loading: 81 kg/m^{2} (16.6 lb/sq ft)

== See also ==
Related development

- Aquila A 210
