= Aquila A 210 =

German light aircraft

A 210
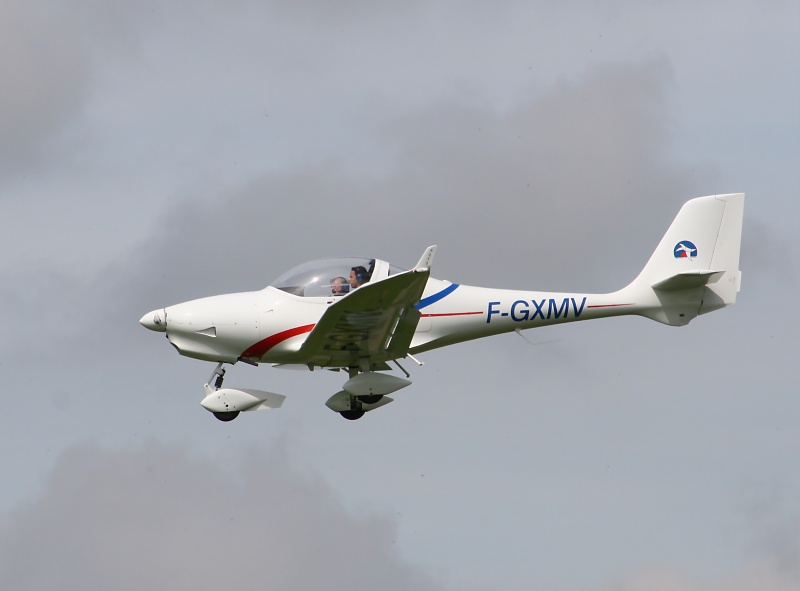

General information
- Type: Two seat light aircraft
- National origin: Germany
- Manufacturer: Aquila Aviation by Excellence
- Status: In production
- Primary user: Cameroon Air Force
- Number built: 222

History
- First flight: 5 March 2000
- Variant: Aquila A 211

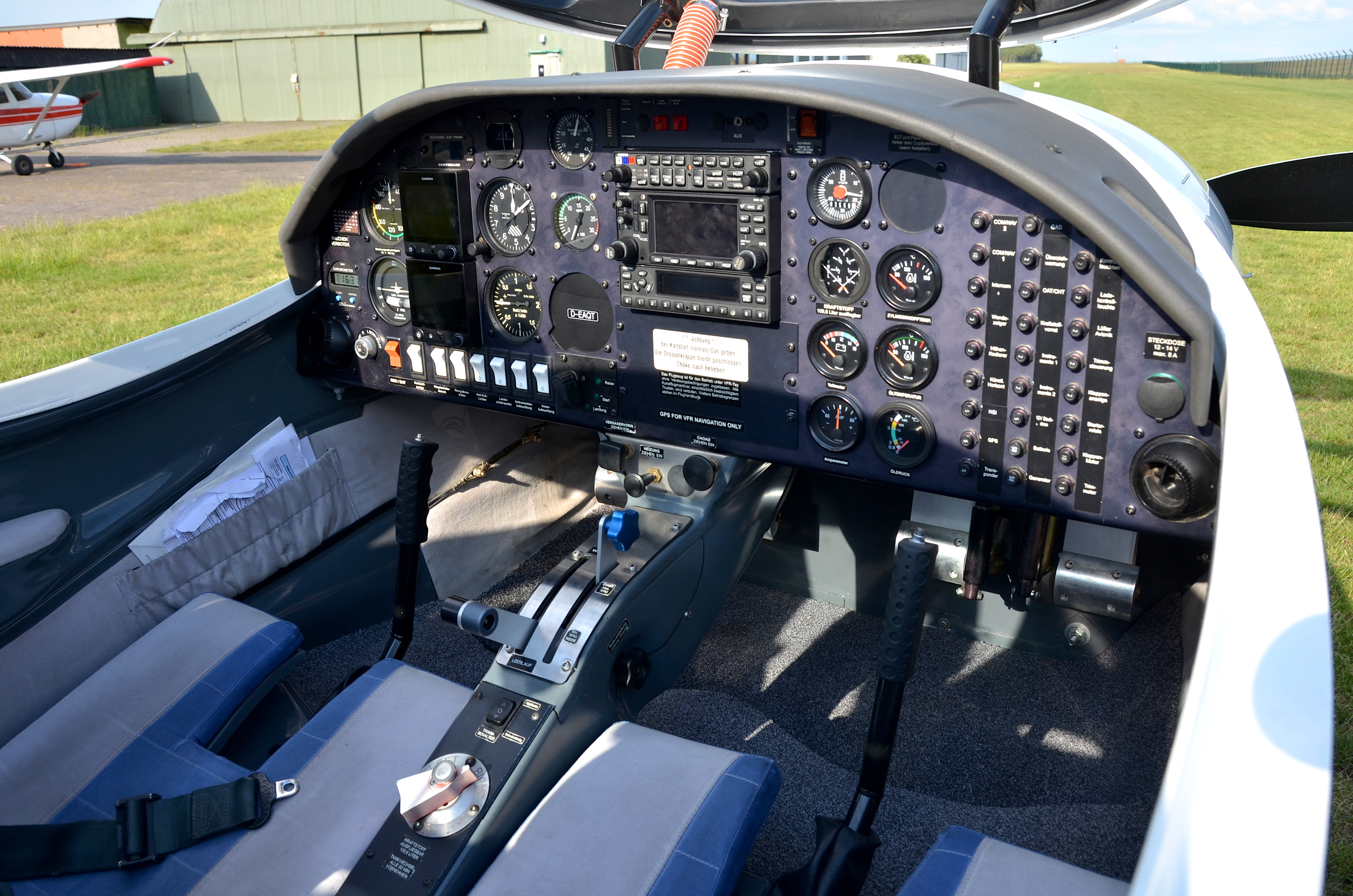
Cockpit of Aquila A 210 (D-EAQT)

The Aquila A 210 is a two-seat reinforced plastic light aircraft produced in Germany from 2002. It remains in production in 2022 as the updated A211.

== Design and development ==
The marketing name A 210 is usually used to refer to Aquila's light side by side two seat aircraft, though its official engineering and certification name is Aquila AT01. Design work started in 1997 and the first flight was made in March 2000.

The A 210 is entirely built from carbon and glass fibre reinforced plastics (CFRP and GFRP). CRFP is used for the more highly stressed members, spars, frames and stringers, GFRP for shells and control surfaces, the latter with GFRP/polyurethane sandwich construction. The low wing has straight tapered inboard sections with increasing sweep outboard and winglets at the tips on production examples. It has a laminar flow section and 4.5° of dihedral. The ailerons are balanced and the inboard single slotted Fowler flaps have two positions.

The A 210 is powered by a Rotax 912 flat four engine driving a two blade propeller. The cabin has uninterrupted transparencies fore and aft, with a slender fuselage behind. The canopy is forward hinged. The tailplane is set just above the fuselage and the fin is swept. A small ventral fin doubles as a tail bumper. The A 210 has a fixed tricycle undercarriage. Its mainwheels are fitted with hydraulic brakes and mounted on spring steel legs from the fuselage. The nosewheel has rubber suspension and is steerable; speed fairings are fitted on all wheels.

== Operational history ==
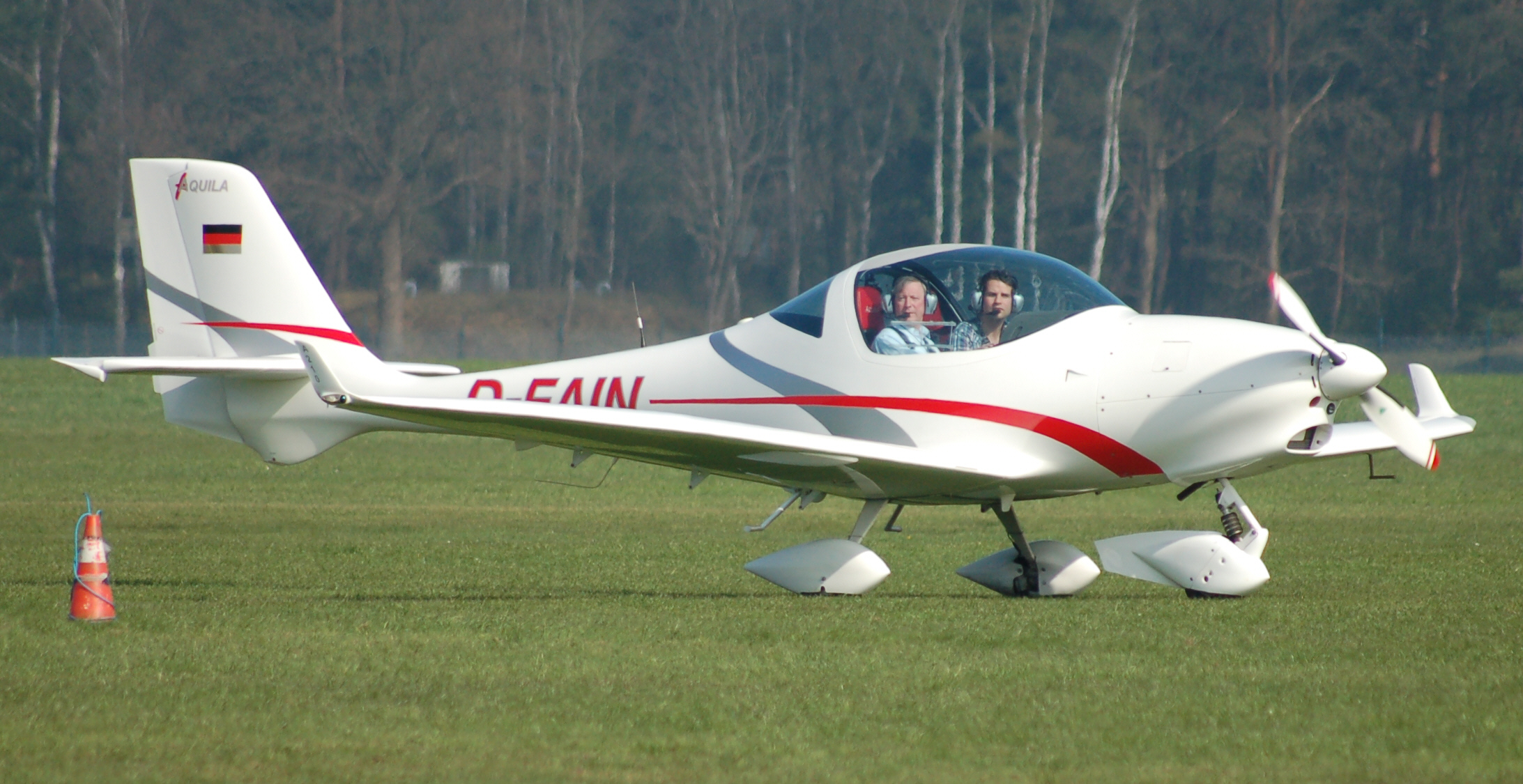

German certification was achieved in 2001 and deliveries began the following year. It gained US certification in 2003. Early sales were to clubs, mostly as training aircraft. Most have been sold in Europe and overall 120 have been built by late 2010. 110 appear as Aquila AT01 on the civil aircraft registrations of European countries excluding Russia in 2010.

After the acquisition of the company by a Turkish investor, one plane was gifted to Gendarmerie General Command.

== Variants ==
Aquila A 210
Original model
Aquila A 211
Conventional instrument panel
Aquila A 211GX
Glass cockpit model

== Specifications ==
Data from Jane's All the World's Aircraft 2011/12

General characteristics

- Capacity: 2
- Length: 7.30 m (23 ft 11 in)
- Wingspan: 10.30 m (33 ft 10 in) excluding winglets
- Height: 2.30 m (7 ft 7 in)
- Wing area: 10.50 m^{2} (113.0 sq ft)
- Airfoil: Horstmann-Quast HQ-42 modified
- Empty weight: 500 kg (1,102 lb)
- Max takeoff weight: 750 kg (1,653 lb)
- Powerplant: 1 × Rotax 912 S3 flat four air and water cooled piston, 73.5 kW (98.6 hp)
- Propellers: 2-bladed MT-Propeller MTV-21-A/175-05 hydraulically variable pitch, 1.66 m (5 ft 5 in) diameter

Performance

- Maximum speed: 241 km/h (150 mph, 130 kn)
- Cruise speed: 191 km/h (119 mph, 103 kn) at 55% power
- Stall speed: 80 km/h (50 mph, 43 kn) flaps down
- Never exceed speed: 306 km/h (190 mph, 165 kn)
- Range: 1,148 km (713 mi, 620 nmi) 55% power at 1,640 m (5,000 ft) with 45 min reserves
- Endurance: 6 h 5 min at 55% power
- Service ceiling: 4,420 m (14,500 ft)
- Rate of climb: 3.82 m/s (752 ft/min)

Avionics
EFIS
