= MEMATT =

Remote control destruction of mines

MEMATT is an unmanned, remote-controlled mine clearance vehicle developed by the Turkish defence company ASFAT.

== Development ==
The machine's design, prototyping, and production took 14 months before it was ready for service with the Turkish Armed Forces. The MEMATT is explosion resistant, moves quickly, is considered reliable, and has a lesser risk of loss of life during operation compared to previous technology. The MEMATT achieved over a 95% success rate in mine tests conducted in Turkey and passed all required tests in Azerbaijan.

== Characteristics ==
The MEMATT is covered with Armox 500T, the world's toughest guard plate is mine-resistant and can be remotely controlled from a distance of 500 m (1,600 ft). The equipment can move at a speed of 4 km/h (1.1 m/s), descend to a depth of 25 centimetres and clear a 1-kilometer-long, 1.7-meter-wide area of mines within an hour. It has a wireless system that allows viewing of cameras and video recordings as well as displaying vehicle information and real-time HD image quality. It also possesses attachment sensors on board that automatically detect the digging depth in order to prevent damage to the attachment.

== Users ==
- Turkey
- Azerbaijan: 20 operational. used to remove mines in Karabakh region
- Togo: 2 units
- Burkina Faso: 2 units
- Syria: 2 units
