= List of firefighting equipment of Turkey =

== Aerial firefighting ==
Total Turkish aerial firefighting fleet consist of 27 aircraft, 101 helicopters and 10 unmanned aerial vehicles which are used by Ministry of Forest and Agriculture, General Directorate of Forest, Turkish Aeronautical Association, Ministry of National Defence and Ministry of Interior and Turkish Armed Forces. The list below consist only known aircraft, helicopters and uavs which are mentioned officially to be used by General Directorate of Forest, Ministry of Forest and Agriculture and Turkish Aeronautical Association and its in inventory.

Aircraft	Image	Origin	Role	Type	Quantity	Details
Firefighting aircraft
CL-215 Bombardier		Canada	Firefighting	Amphibious aircraft	8	Used by Turkish Aeronautical Association. 3 are operational. Rest are non-airworthy condition. All planned to be modernized.
Beriev Be-200		Russia	Firefighting	Amphibious aircraft	3	Used by Turkish Aeronautical Association. Leased from Russia.
M-18 Dromader		Poland	Firefighting	Utility aircraft	11+2	Used by Turkish Aeronautical Association. 11 aircraft are non-airworthy condition. Required maintenance. Additional 2 aircraft was leased from Poland.
Air Tractor AT-802		United States	Firefighting	Amphibious aircraft	12	Used by General Directorate of Forest. On order.
Antonov An-32P		Ukraine	Firefighting	Amphibious aircraft	1	Leased from Ukraine.
Beechcraft Super King Air		United States	Reconnaissance	Reconnaissance aircraft	1	350ER variant in use. Used by General Directorate of Forest.
Cessna Citation V		United States	Transport/Reconnaissance	Transport aircraft	11	Used by General Directorate of Forest.
Cessna Citation III		United States	Transport/Reconnaissance	Transport aircraft	1	650 variant in use.
Firefighting helicopter
Boeing CH-47D Chinook		United States	Firefighting	Heavy transport helicopter	12	Used by Turkish Aeronautical Association and General Directorate of Forest. Leased from USA.
Sikorsky S-64 Skycrane		United States	Firefighting	Heavy transport helicopter	N/A	Leased from USA
Mil Mi-26		Russia	Firefighting	Heavy transport helicopter	N/A	Leased from Russia.
Kamov Ka-32		Russia	Firefighting	Utility helicopter	3	Used by General Directorate of Forest. Leased from Russia.
Mil Mi-8		Russia	Firefighting	Utility helicopter	40	Used by Turkish Aeronautical Association. Leased from Russia.
Sikorsky/TAI T-70		United StatesTurkey	Firefighting	Utility helicopter	3	Used by General Directorate of Forest. Licensed built by TAI.
Bell 429 GlobalRanger		United States	Firefighting	Multipurpose utility helicopter	5	Used by General Directorate of Forest.
TAI T925	Old design	Turkey	Firefighting	Utility helicopter		10 ton class utility helicopter. 8 on order.
Unmanned aerial vehicles
Bayraktar TB2		Turkey	Reconnaissance/Survelliance	UAV	Unknown	Used by Ministry of Forest and Agriculture.
TAI Anka		Turkey	Reconnaissance/Survelliance	UAV	Unknown	Used by Turkish Armed Forces.
TAI Aksungur		Turkey	Reconnaissance/Survelliance	UAV	Unknown	Used by General Directorate of Forest.
Alpin	-	Turkey	Reconnaissance/Survelliance	Rotorcraft/VTOL UAV	Unknown	Used by Ministry of Forest and Agriculture.
