= Combat Search and Rescue (Turkish Armed Forces) =

- Muharebe Arama Kurtarma
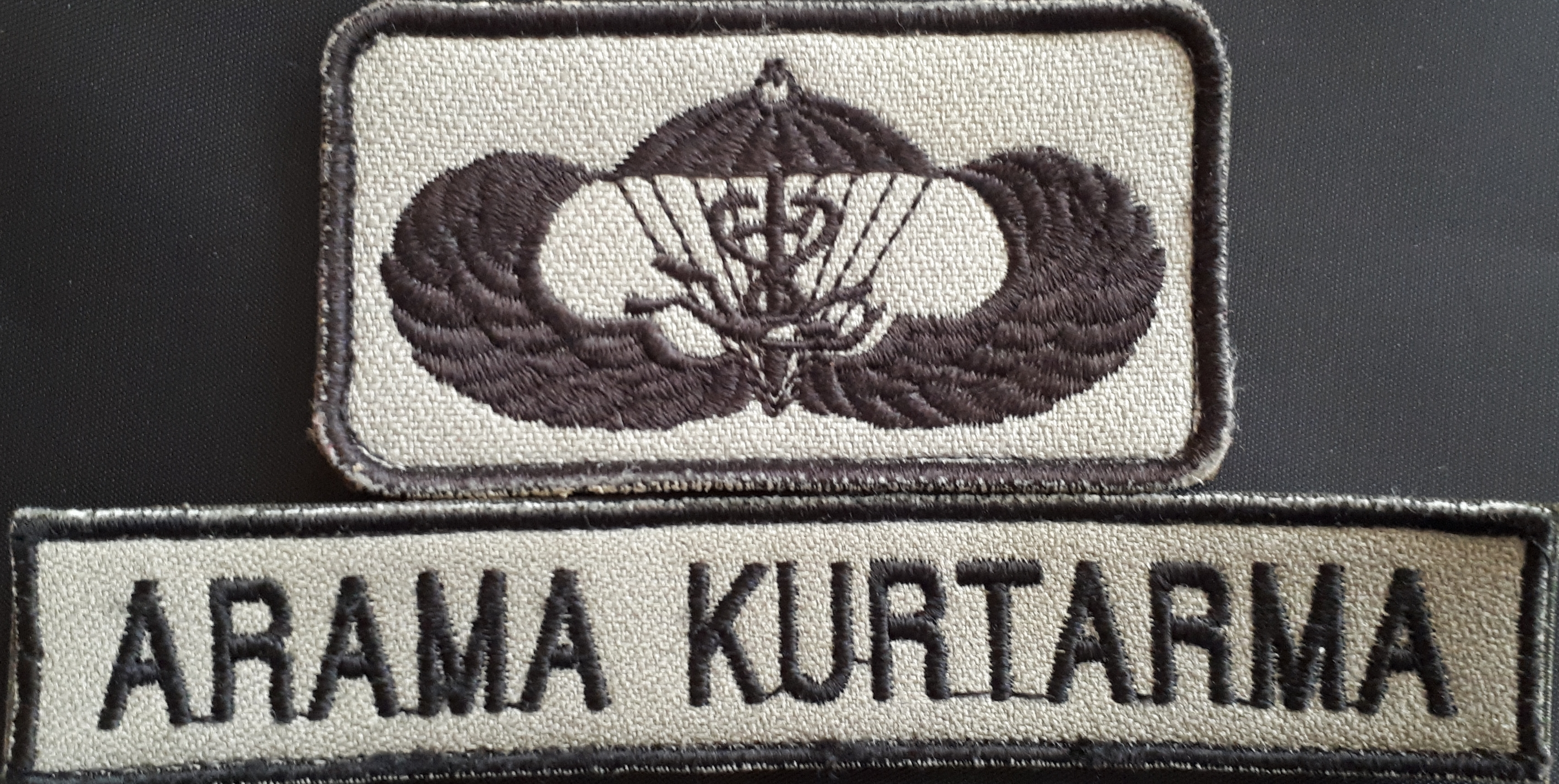
- Identifying patch of the Personnel Rescue
- Country: Turkey
- Branch: Turkish Air Force
- Type: Combat search and rescue, Forward air control
- Garrison/HQ: Çiğli, İzmir
- Nickname(s): Arama Kurtarma İhtisaslı Personel, Personel Kurtarma
- Motto(s): "Heroes save the homeland, we save the heroes"

Insignia
- Abbreviation: MAK, AKİP, PK

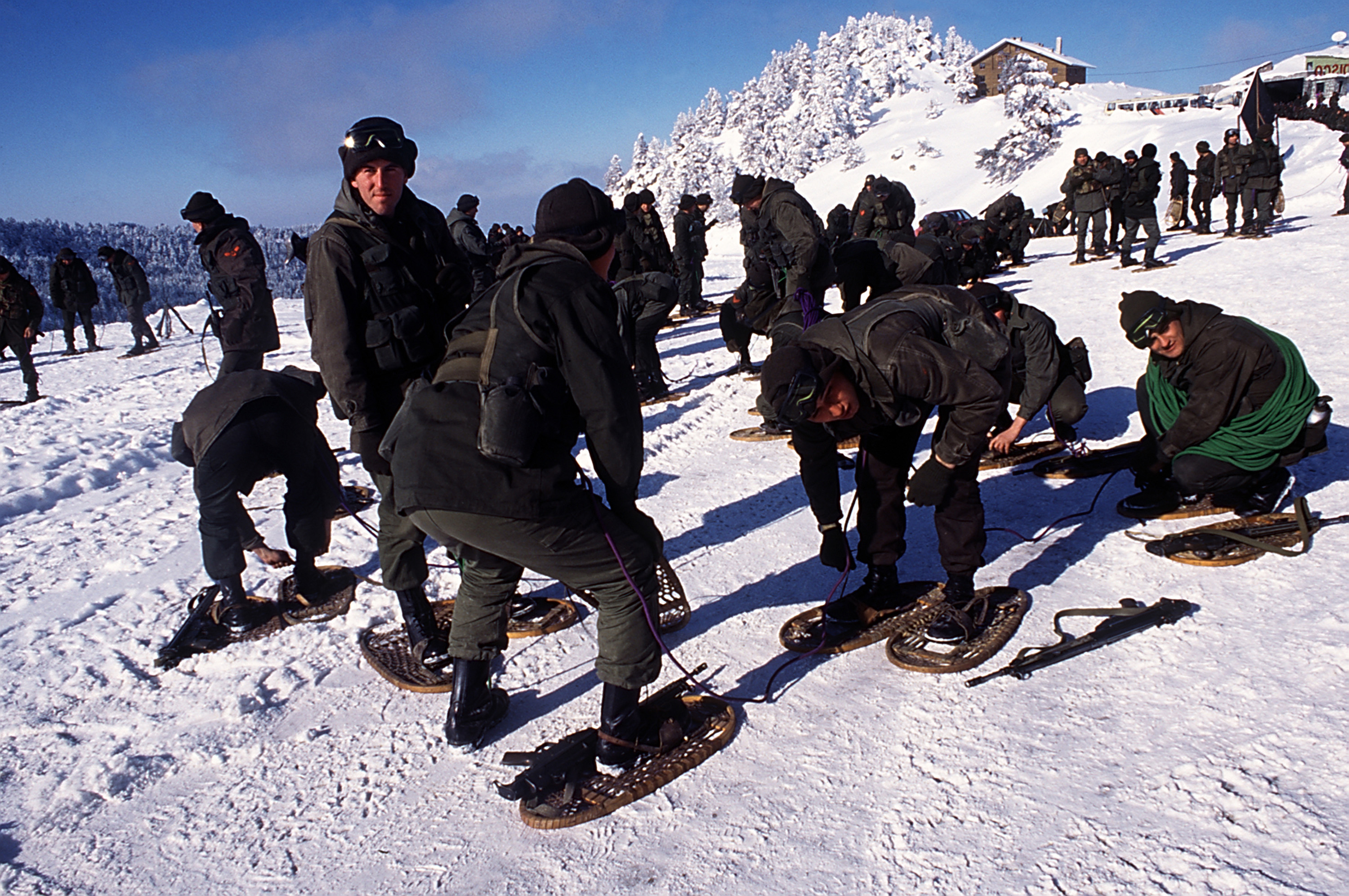
Operatives in 1995

The Combat Search and Rescue (Turkish: Muharebe Arama Kurtarma - MAK) or by its official name Personnel Rescue (Turkish: Personel Kurtarma - PK) is a combat search and rescue and advanced air controller unit affiliated to the Turkish Air Force whose task is to recover pilots and other military personnel stranded behind enemy lines and qualified service member who directs the action of combat aircraft engaged in close air support and other offensive air operations from a forward position. It is similar to the United States Air Force Pararescue unit. Between 2017 and 2021, it was also known as 'Search and Rescue Specialized Personnel' (Turkish: Arama Kurtarma İhtisas Personel - AKİP). It is selected from among the officers and non-commissioned officers of the Turkish Air Force who are highly talented and who have passed various elimination stages. They serve as squadrons in accordance with the air base commands where they are located. They receive 53 weeks of training.

The activities first started in 1953. Between 1970 and 1990, UH-1H and C-47 were included in the inventory and used. Squadrons began to be established in 1995. In 2003, the name of the Search and Rescue Survival course command was changed to Combat Search and Rescue School Command. In addition to the duties of Military Search and Rescue (CSAR) and Target Designation (JTAC), the unit, which is also in communication with the Search and Rescue Coordination Center, participates in civilian search and rescue activities when needed. In 2006, they carried out the rescue operation of the pilot who crashed into the Aegean Sea as a result of the collision of Turkish and Greek F-16 aircraft. They participated in Operation Olive Branch.

The trainings given are:

- Summer and winter mountaineering, Skiing
- Military parachute free jumping
- Frogman
- Escape and rescue
- Survival
- Target marking, Dynamic-Time sensitive targeting
- Air support in populated areas
- High altitude jump
- Air infiltration
- Launching boats into the sea
- Sea rescue.

Personnel who complete the training are accepted to the team. Teams are trained to stay in the field for long periods with 30-pound weapons, ammunition and equipment. The physical adequacy of the teams is evaluated every year. Personnel who fail the exam are removed from the team.

They conduct JTAC training with Special Forces Command teams in the international Anka exercise held every year.

== Equipment ==
Combat Search and Rescue
Pistols	Glock 19, Canik TP9
Assault Rifles	Heckler & Koch HK416, M4A1
Smg	Heckler & Koch MP7
Sniper Rifles	M110 Semi-Automatic Sniper System
Machine Guns	FN Minimi
Others	Ops Core, BDATech MTS, TYR Tactical PICO
