= LHX =

LHX may refer to:

- Light Helicopter Experimental, a 1980s United States Army project to replace old helicopter models, and whose helicopter candidates included a Bell/McDonnell Douglas design and the prototype Boeing/Sikorsky RAH-66 Comanche
- LHX Attack Chopper, a 1990 computer game that includes a simulation of a Light Helicopter Experimental helicopter similar to the RAH-66 Comanche
- Luohe West railway station, China Railway pinyin code LHX
- The stock symbol for L3Harris Technologies
