= FCX =

FCX may refer to:

- Honda FCX, a family of hydrogen fuel cell automobiles from Honda
- Honda FCX Clarity, a new-generation hydrogen fuel cell car from Honda
- Freeport-McMoRan, a mining company whose NYSE ticker symbol is FCX
- Bell FCX-001, a concept helicopter by Bell Helicopter
