= Sikorsky S-75 =

1980s American experimental helicopter

S-75 ACAP
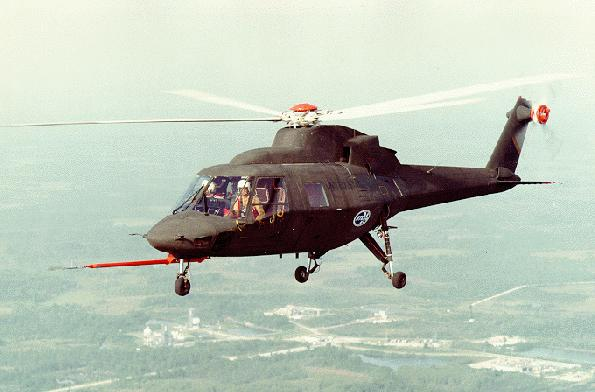
- Sikorsky S-75 ACAP all-composite test aircraft

General information
- Type: Experimental helicopter
- Manufacturer: Sikorsky Aircraft
- Primary user: United States Army
- Number built: 2

History
- First flight: 27 July 1984
- Developed from: Sikorsky S-76

The Sikorsky S-75 was a proof-of-concept all-composite helicopter. Sikorsky Aircraft used all-composite materials to replace metal to provide greater strength, lighter weight, lower manufacturing costs, and reduce maintenance costs.

== Design and development ==
The Sikorsky S-75 was developed under the US Army's Advanced Composite Airframe Program (ACAP), the goal of which was the development of an all-composite helicopter fuselage, lighter and less costly to build than predominantly metal airframes in support of the Light Helicopter Experimental (LHX) program. In February 1981, contracts were awarded to Sikorsky and Bell Helicopter, with Bell submitting its Model D292. The S-75 flew for the first time on 27 July 1984.

The S-75 mated an entirely new composite airframe with the twin turboshaft engines, transmission, and main and tail rotors of Sikorsky's S-76A civil transport helicopter. The S-75's floors, roof and most exterior surfaces were of more ballistically resistant Kevlar, while most of the aircraft's basic load-bearing structure was built of graphite or a graphite/epoxy blend. The machine was equipped with specially designed impact-resistant crew and passenger seats and high-strength pneumatic shock absorbers on its fixed tricycle landing gear, in keeping with the Army's requirement that the ACAP aircraft meet or exceed all existing military crashworthiness standards. The aircraft was flown by two pilots, and could carry up to six passengers in the 100-cubic-foot (2.8 m^{3}) rear cabin.

== Operational history ==
The S-75 underwent a 50-hour evaluation by the Army, and was found to have exceeded the weight- and cost-saving criteria set in the original ACAP specification. Sikorsky gained a wealth of data on the fabrication and use of composite airframes through building the S-75, and Sikorsky's later designs incorporated many of its features. Testing of the machine continued through April 1985, after which it was withdrawn from service and placed in long-term storage.

== Specifications (S-75) ==
Data from U.S. Army Aircraft Since 1947,

General characteristics

- Crew: 2
- Capacity: up to 6 passengers
- Length: 43 ft 8 in (13.31 m)
- Height: 13 ft 2 in (4.01 m)
- Empty weight: 6,421 lb (2,913 kg)
- Max takeoff weight: 8,470 lb (3,842 kg)
- Powerplant: 2 × Allison Model 250-C30S turboshaft engines, 650 shp (480 kW) each for take-off
- Main rotor diameter: 44 ft (13 m)

Performance

- Maximum speed: 160 kn (180 mph, 300 km/h)
- Cruise speed: 138 kn (159 mph, 256 km/h)
- Range: 346 nmi (398 mi, 641 km)
- Service ceiling: 13,500 ft (4,100 m)

== See also ==
Related development

- Boeing-Sikorsky RAH-66 Comanche
- Sikorsky S-76

Aircraft of comparable role, configuration, and era

- Bell D-292
- Boeing Model 360

Related lists

- List of rotorcraft
