= Sikorsky S-76 =

American medium-size commercial utility helicopter

S-76
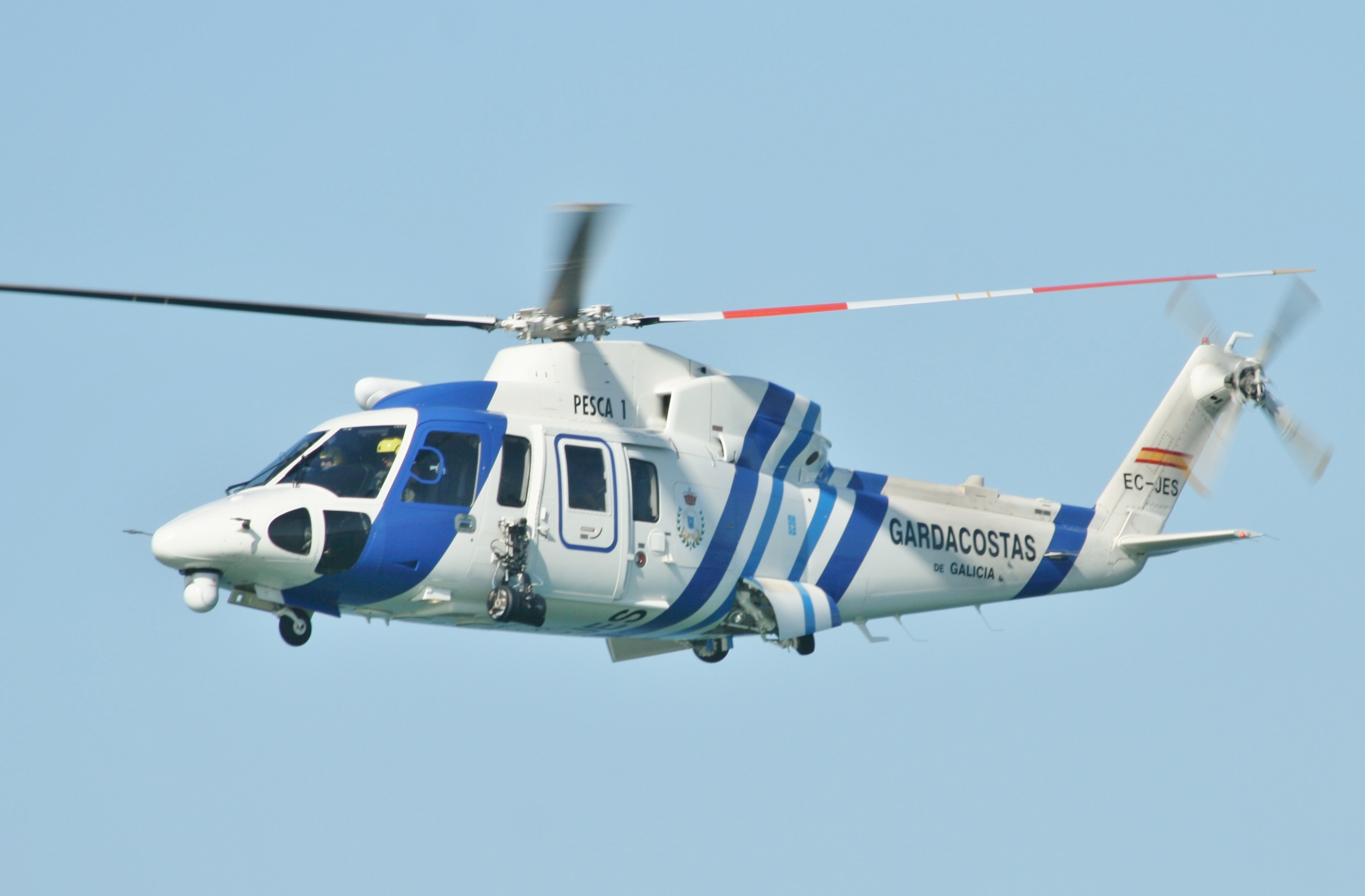
- A Galician Coast Guard S-76C+

General information
- Type: Utility helicopter
- National origin: United States
- Manufacturer: Sikorsky Aircraft
- Status: In Service
- Primary users: Bristow Helicopters CHC Helicopter
- Number built: 875

History
- Manufactured: 1976–present
- First flight: 13 March 1977
- Variant: Sikorsky S-75

The Sikorsky S-76 is a medium-size commercial utility helicopter designed and produced by the American helicopter manufacturer Sikorsky Aircraft. It is the company's first helicopter specifically developed for the civilian market.

The S-76 was developed during the mid-1970s, originally being designated S-74 but renamed in honor of the U.S. Bicentennial. Drawing upon its recently developed S-70 helicopter, it features twin turboshaft engines, four-bladed main and tail rotors, and retractable landing gear. On 13 March 1977, the prototype performed its maiden flight. The initial production variant was the S-76A, the first deliveries of which took place on 27 February 1979. Several improved models were produced over time, including the S-76 Mk II launched in 1982, and the S-76B in 1987. Development of the S-76D was particularly troubled, being delayed by four years of delays due to flight envelope issues; it was finally certified for operation on 12 October 2012.

The S-76 initially encountered strong demand from the off-shore oil drilling industry; later on, demand shifted towards the VIP sector of the market. It performed several noteworthy flights, such as the first circumnavigation of the world in an east-to-west direction by a helicopter, and an autonomous demonstration flight during 2016. Sikorsky also used individual helicopters, often heavily modified for the purpose, for experimental purposes and to support other programmes. Demand for the S-76 waned during the 2010s, as newer helicopters such as the AgustaWestland AW139 proved to be stiff competition. During March 2022, Sikorsky halted new orders for the S-76, but stated that it was looking at opportunities for future overseas manufacturing with foreign partners.

On January 26, 2020, NBA player Kobe Bryant died in a Sikorsky S-76B after it crashed in Calabasas, California, killing all nine on board, including his daughter Gianna Bryant and baseball coach John Altobelli.

== Development ==
The development of the S-76 commenced during the mid-1970s as the S-74. The S-74 was subsequently redesignated the S-76 in honor of the U.S. Bicentennial. The company had set the design goal of producing a medium helicopter suitable for corporate transportation and the oil drilling industry. Sikorsky's design work on the S-70 helicopter (which was selected for use by the United States Army as the UH-60 Black Hawk) was utilized in the development of the S-76, incorporating S-70 design technology in its rotor blades and rotor heads. It was the first Sikorsky helicopter designed purely for commercial rather than military use. Despite this, Sikorsky planned to design it to conform with either the relevant FAR or military standards, whichever was more stringent, with the goal being the production of a rugged civil helicopter which could be used "off-the-shelf" for military purposes.

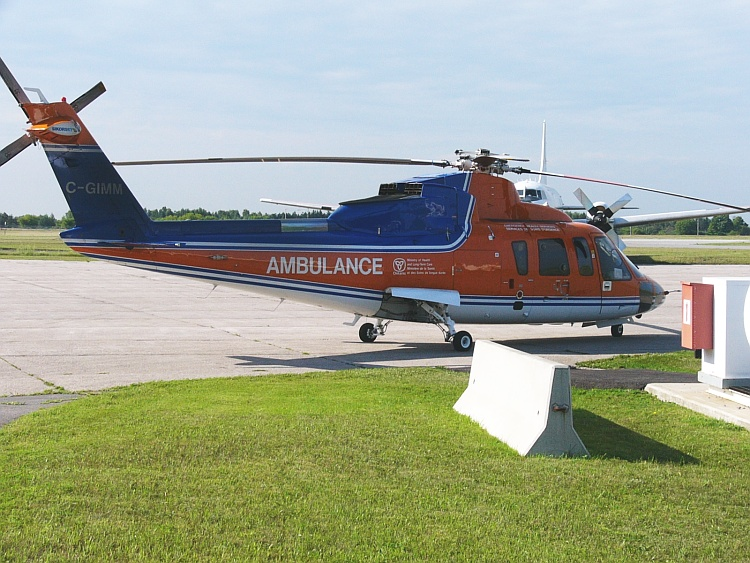
An early production Sikorsky S-76A owned by Canadian Helicopters and used as an air ambulance

It was announced on 19 January 1975, before it had even been designed and Sikorsky began taking contracts; they would use these already signed operators for market research during development. The intended engine had also not yet been designed and was to be purpose-built alongside the S-76. Prototype construction began May 1976, with the first flight scheduled for May 1977, and deliveries scheduled to commence July 1978. On 13 March 1977, two months ahead of schedule, the prototype performed its maiden flight. On 21 November 1978, initial US Federal Aviation Administration type certification was granted, while the first customer delivery took place on 27 February 1979. During late 1978, the S-76 was officially named "Spirit", however, this name was officially dropped by Sikorsky on 9 October 1980, reportedly due to translation issues into some foreign languages.

The first production variant was the S-76A. Several improved models were produced over time. During 1982, the S-76 Mk II, equipped with more powerful engines and other refinements, was introduced. In 1987, production of the S-76B, powered by Pratt & Whitney Canada PT6B-36A and Pratt & Whitney Canada PT6B-36B engines; it was capable to attaining a maximum speed of 155 kn (287 km/h) at sea level. By early 2001, in excess of 500 S-76s had been delivered.

During the early 2000s, the S-76C+ was the main version in production; it was equipped with twin Turbomeca Arriel 2S1 engines with FADEC and a Honeywell EFIS suite. This version also incorporated active noise suppression, vibration dampers and a composite main rotor. On 3 January 2006, the S-76 C++ replaced earlier versions in production; it is powered by twin Turbomeca Arriel 2S2 engines and incorporates an improved and quieter transmission as well as minor changes in the interior equipment and avionics. By January 2006, Sikorsky had secured 92 orders for this model.

Development of the follow-on S-76D was subject to four years of delays due to technical problems in expanding the flight envelope. On 7 February 2009, the prototype conducted its first flight, and type certification was initially expected during 2011 while deliveries were forecast to start at the end of that year. The FAA issued certification on 12 October 2012. Three prototypes were used in the certification program, with one aircraft used to certify the optional rotor electric ice-protection system. The "D" model is powered by 1,050 hp (783 kW) Pratt & Whitney Canada PW210S engines driving composite rotors and incorporates active vibration control. Performance is substantially improved with the added power, but initial certification retains the same 11,700 lb (5,307 kg) gross weight and maximum 155 kn (287 km/h) cruise speed as earlier models. (Note: Trimble, Stephen. "Sikorsky explains four-year delivery slip for S-76D". FlightGlobal.)

The rate of manufacturing noticeably declined during the 2010s; only a dozen S-76s were delivered between 2016 and 2020. During September 2013, it was announced that the Chinese manufacturer Changhe Aircraft Industries Corporation had been contracted to produce the S-76D airframe. By 2022 April, in excess of 875 S-76s had reportedly been built.

During March 2022, Sikorsky announced that it had halted new orders for the S-76 while potential overseas manufacturing partners and licensing opportunities were being evaluated. Reasons for the hold included decreasing sales volume, the high cost of supply and manufacturing, and the prohibitive costs associated with adapting the S-76 to meet increasing safety mandates. This move effectively ended production of the S-76 following the completion of the three orders that were outstanding, and represented a withdrawal by Sikorsky from the medium commercial helicopter market. Sikorsky has stated that it will continue to actively manufacture spare parts for the S-76 at its Connecticut facility.

== Design ==
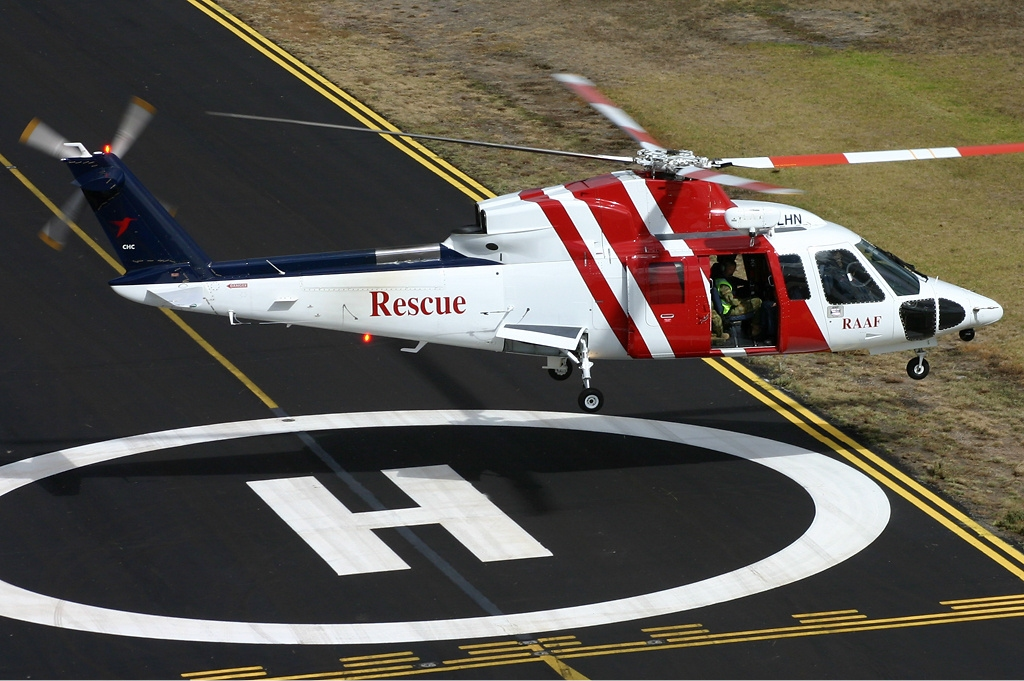
S-76A++ used for Search and Rescue at Royal Australian Air Force bases operated by CHC Helicopter

The S-76 is of a conventional configuration, with a four-bladed fully articulated main rotor and a four-bladed anti-torque rotor on the port side of the tailboom. It is powered by a pair of turboshaft engines, which are located above the passenger cabin. On the prototypes and initial production aircraft, these engines were Allison 250-C30s, a variant of the popular Allison 250 engine that was developed specially for the S-76. It had a single-stage centrifugal compressor instead of the multi-stage axial/centrifugal compressor of earlier models of the engine, rated at 650 shp (480 kW) for takeoff. These engines are connected to the main rotor by the main gearbox, a three-stage unit with a bull gear as its final stage, rather than the planetary gear that had been used by previous generations of Sikorsky helicopters. This arrangement has 30% fewer parts and lower costs than a more conventional design.

The main rotor is furnished with a single piece aluminum hub fitted with elastomeric bearings, which are designed not to require lubrication or any other kind of maintenance throughout its design life. The main rotor blades have titanium spars and incorporate a ten degree twist to provide an even loading when hovering, while they use a non-symmetrical airfoil section with a drooped leading edge. The rotor tips are tapered and swept back. The rotor blades on later-build S-76s feature ice protection measures. The flight controls are servo-assisted and have a Stability Augmentation System fitted. A retractable nosewheel undercarriage is fitted, the reduced drag from this arrangement is credited with increasing the S-76A's cruising speed by 6 knots (6.9 mph; 11 km/h). Emergency flotation gear can be fitted, which uses helium-filled bags to increase buoyancy in the event of a forced landing on water.

The fuselage of the S-76 is made from both metal and composite materials; while the nose is composed of fiberglass, the cabin area primarily employs a light alloy honeycomb structure, the semi-monocoque tailboom is also constructed of light alloy. A pair of pilots are typically seated in a side-by-side arrangement in the cockpit, situated ahead of the cabin, which can accommodate a further 12 passengers in three rows of four, or between four and eight passengers in a more luxurious executive seating configuration. Later models can be flown by a single pilot when provisioned with an appropriately configured cockpit. The S-76 was not originally designed with crashworthy fuel systems, leading to difficulties continuing production after an FAA requirement was implemented in April 2020.

== Operational history ==
Early on in its commercial career, the S-76 became popular for offshore operations, such as to oil rigs. Numerous operators have either purchased or leased the type specifically to operate in this sector.

During 1982, the S-76A set multiple class records for range, climb, speed (Note: "Thomas F. Doyle Jr. (USA) (1845)". Fédération Aéronautique Internationale. 10 October 2017.) (Note: "Thomas F. Doyle Jr. (USA) (11660)". Fédération Aéronautique Internationale. 10 October 2017.) (Note: "Nicholas D. Lappos (USA) (2262)". Fédération Aéronautique Internationale. 10 October 2017. Others: 1827, 1839, 1844, 2067, 2068, 2069, 2070, 2071, 2072, 2073, 2074, 2100, 2222, 2223, 3415, 10273) and ceiling. (Note: "Byron Graham Jr. (USA) (9947)". Fédération Aéronautique Internationale. 10 October 2017.) In June 1995, the S-76 became the first helicopter to circumnavigate the world in an east-to-west direction, piloted by the Australian adventurer Dick Smith.

The Philippine Air Force took delivery in 1983 of 17 units of S-76 Mk II Utility : 12 AUH -76 were configured for use in COIN, troop/logistic support, and medevac duties; 2 units were SAR-configured; and 3 units were configured as VIP Transport.

Several airlines have operated the S-76A on scheduled services, including Helijet Airways of Vancouver, British Columbia, Canada.

During the campaigning in the run up to the 2005 United Kingdom general election, both the Labour and the Conservative parties dispensed with conventional 'battle buses' in favour of S-76 helicopters to quickly transport their leaders around the British Isles. According to Jason Lambert, Sikorsky's vice president of commercial and military systems, the S-76 had proven itself to be particularly popular amongst VIP customers. By 2020, according to Sikorsky, ten countries operated S-76s to carry their heads of state.

S-76s have been periodically used to test new technologies and capabilities. The highly-modified S-76 SHADOW (Sikorsky Helicopter Advance Demonstrator of Operators Workload) was built to demonstrate its advanced cockpit for single-pilot operations and to study the human engineering interface between the pilot and the cockpit controls and displays; this was in aid of the RAH-66 Comanche armed reconnaissance helicopter programme. During the 2010s, an S-76 was configured for autonomous operation and demonstrated this ability in June 2016, flying for a distance of around 30 miles (48 km) with no human intervention beyond limited inputs made via a tablet computer, the take off and landing phases were also performed autonomously.

During the 2010s, many S-76 operators elected to replace the type with newer medium-lift rotorcraft, such as the AgustaWestland AW139. In early 2020, it was observed that, while the S-76D was no longer compliant with FAA regulations to permit its sale to US-based customers, sales were still possible to several other countries.

== Variants ==
=== Civil ===
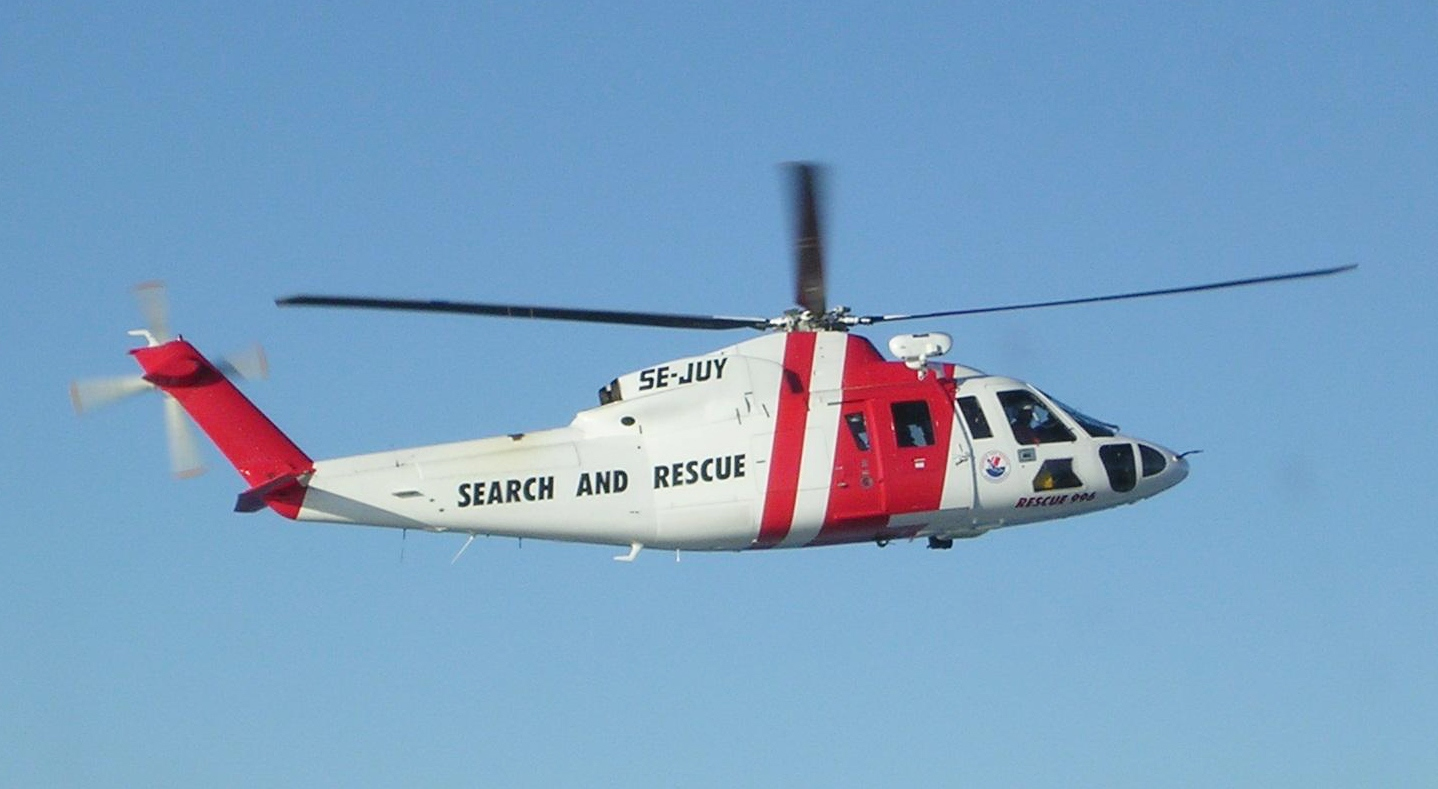
S-76C search and rescue helicopter operated by Norrlandsflyg

- S-76A

Original production version, powered by two 650 shp (480 kW) Rolls-Royce (Allison) 250-C30 turboshaft engines. Large number modified to S-76A+, A++, C, and C+. 284 manufactured.

- S-76A Utility

Utility transport version, equipped with sliding doors and a strengthened floor.

- S-76A+

Unsold S-76s were fitted with two Turbomeca Arriel 1S turboshaft engines. 17 manufactured.

- S-76A++

S-76 helicopters fitted with two Turbomeca Arriel 1S1 turboshaft engines.

- S-76A Mk II

Improved all-weather transport version, fitted with more powerful engines, and other detail improvements.

- S-76B

Powered by two Pratt & Whitney Canada PT6B-36A or Pratt & Whitney Canada PT6B-36B turboshaft engines. 101 built.

- S-76C

Powered by two 539-kW (981-shp) Turbomeca Arriel 1S1 turboshaft engines. 43 manufactured.

- S-76C+

Uprated version, fitted with improved Turbomeca Arriel 2S1 turboshafts with FADEC. 35 manufactured.

- S-76C++

Turbomeca Arriel 2S2

- S-76D

Powered by two Pratt & Whitney Canada PW210S. Also features a Thales Topdeck avionics suite and improved noise signature over all previous variants.

=== Military ===
AUH-76 "Dragon Lady"
Armed utility transport version of the S-76 Mk. II. 12 Units Delivered in 1983 to the Philippine Air Force. Initially armed with two fixed forward firing M134 7.62 mm minigun (one each side) and a 7-round rocket pod on each side and radar altimeters. When M134 became unserviceable, the guns were replaced with M2P Machine Guns.
H-76 Eagle
A militarised variant suitable for naval operations, based on the S-76B, it was announced during 1985 but none were ever sold.
H.LL.4
(Thai: ฮ.ลล.๔) Royal Thai Armed Forces designation for the S-76B.

=== Experimental derivatives ===
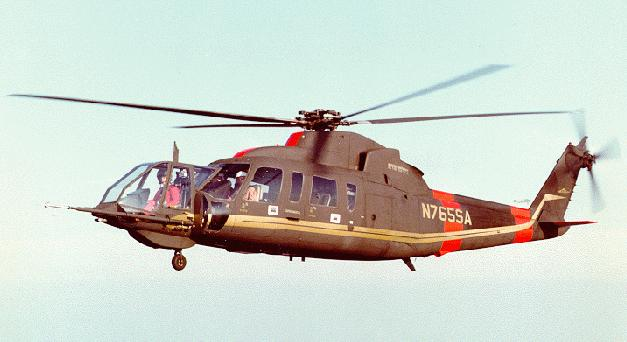
Sikorsky S-76 SHADOW

Sikorsky S-75
The Advanced Composite Airframe Program (ACAP) was an all-composite Sikorsky early LHX proof of concept aircraft. Designated S-75, it mated a new composite airframe with S-76 engines, rotors and powertrain components.
Sikorsky S-76 SHADOW
Boeing-Sikorsky MANPRINT study. The original concept of the LHX program was to produce a one-man helicopter that could do more than a two-man aircraft. The Sikorsky (S-76) Helicopter Advance Demonstrator of Operators Workload (SHADOW) had a single-pilot advanced cockpit grafted to its nose. The purpose was to study the MANPRINT or human engineering interface between the pilot and the cockpit controls and displays. The cockpit was the prototype of a single-pilot cockpit designed for use on the prototype RAH-66 Comanche armed reconnaissance helicopter. The cockpit was designed so sensors would feed data to the pilot through helmet-mounted displays. The MANPRINT study determined that single-pilot operation of the Comanche was unsafe, and would result in pilot overload. As result of this study, the Comanche was designed to be operated by a crew of two.

== Operators ==
=== Civil ===
The S-76 is in civil service around the world with airlines, corporations, hospitals, and government operators. The world's largest civilian fleet is the 79 Sikorsky S-76 helicopters operated by CHC Helicopter Corporation.

=== Current military and government ===
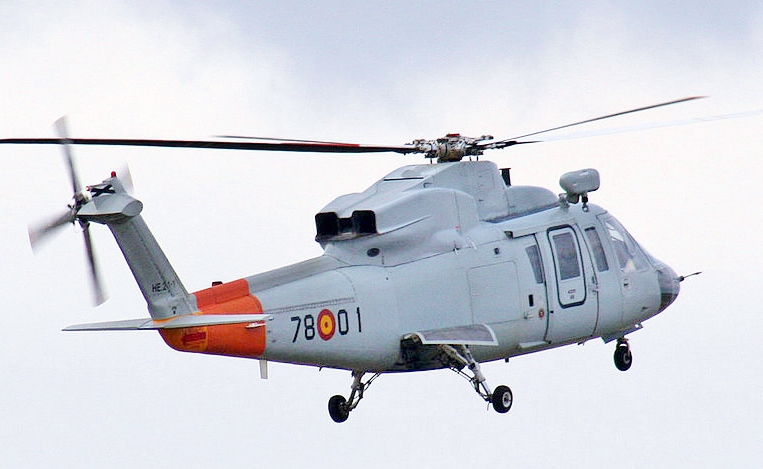
An S-76C of the Spanish Air Force

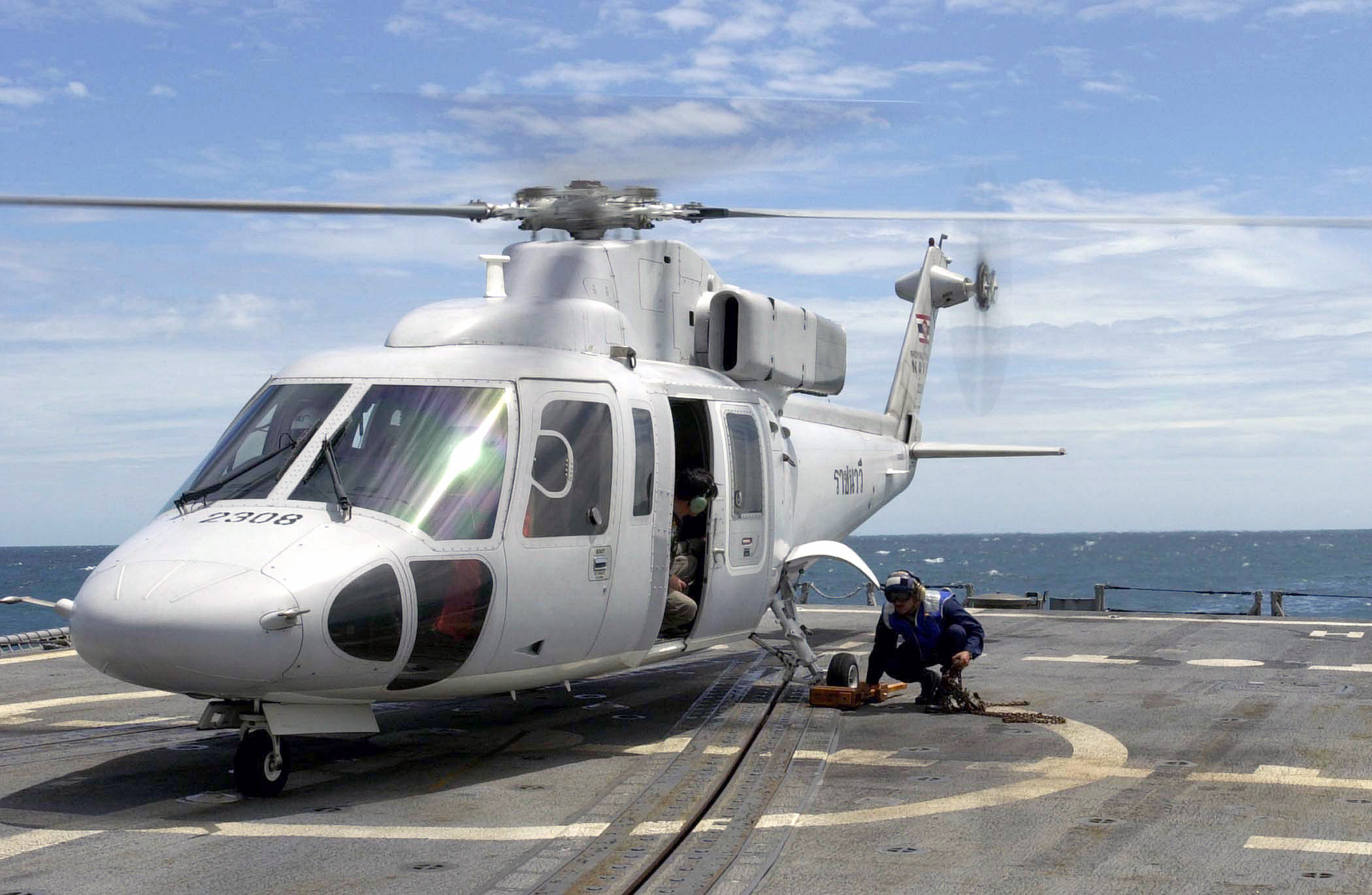
Sikorsky S-76B of the Royal Thai Navy

Argentina

- Argentine Air Force

Canada

- Emergency Health Services LifeFlight (Nova Scotia)

China
Ministry of Transport

ISR

- Magen David Adom (National EMS service)

Japan

- Japan Coast Guard

Jordan

- Royal Jordanian Air Force

Philippines

- Philippine Air Force - 9 Units active in 2024 out of 17 delivered.

Republic of China

- National Airborne Service Corps (Note: "S-76B". National Airborne Service Corps.)

Saudi Arabia

- Ministry of Interior

Serbia

- Police of Serbia

Spain

- Spanish Air and Space Force - 8 Units
- Galician Coast Guard (Note: Llera, Luis Carlos (11 August 2010). "Los ángeles del mar de Galicia han salvado ya a 1.321 náufragos" [The angels of the Galician sea have already saved 1,321 castaways]. La Voz de Galicia (in Spanish).) (Note: Luaces, Antón. "Pesca tramita la adquisición del tercer helicóptero de Gardacostas" [Fishing is in progress for the acquisition of a third helicopter from Gardacostas]. La Opinión a Coruña (in Spanish).)

Thailand

- Royal Thai Navy - 4 Units.

United Kingdom

- The King's Helicopter Flight (Note: "Air Travel". The Royal Household.)

=== Former military and government ===
Australia

- Royal Australian Air Force (replaced by the AgustaWestland AW139 during the late 2010s)

Canada

- Ornge / Ontario Air Ambulance Corp. (originally owned by Canadian Helicopters and eventually o/o by Ornge and replaced by AW139 in 2012). 1 donated to Centennial College in Toronto (C-GIMZ) and 1 to Canadian Aviation and Space Museum (C-GIMB).

Honduras

- Honduran Air Force

Hong Kong

- Royal Hong Kong Auxiliary Air Force
- Government Flying Service

Iceland

- Icelandic Coast Guard

== Accidents ==
- On 17 July 2002, S-76A G-BJVX, operated by Bristow Helicopters, crashed into the North Sea due to the failure of a main rotor blade. The operator temporarily halted all helicopter flights over the North Sea until operations resumed on 3 September 2002.
- On 10 August 2005, a Sikorsky S-76C+ flying Copterline Flight 103 crashed into Tallinn Bay in the Gulf of Finland. The cause was a failure of the hydraulic flight control system.
- On 31 May 2013, an S-76A air ambulance, operated by Ornge, crashed near Moosonee Airport, Canada. The cause was inadequate training of pilots for night-time operations.
- On 10 March 2017, S-76C++ TC-HEZ, operated by Swan Aviation, crashed during a private charter flight in Istanbul, Turkey. The cause is unknown, but poor visibility conditions were present at the time.
- On 26 January 2020, S-76B N72EX crashed in Calabasas, California, killing all nine occupants, including the retired professional basketball player Kobe Bryant and his daughter Gianna. The cause was determined to be the pilot Ara Zobayan experiencing spatial disorientation due to heavy fog, as well as pilot error.
- On 16 September 2020, an S-76A air ambulance of the Philippine Air Force crashed in Basilan Province in Southern Philippines during bad weather conditions, killing all four military crew members onboard.
- On 26 March 2025, an S-76 firefighting helicopter crashed while responding to wildfires in Uiseong, killing the pilot.
- On 10 July 2026, an S-76D crashed in Pocahontas County, West Virginia. There was only a single pilot onboard who was killed.

== Specifications (Sikorsky S-76C++) ==
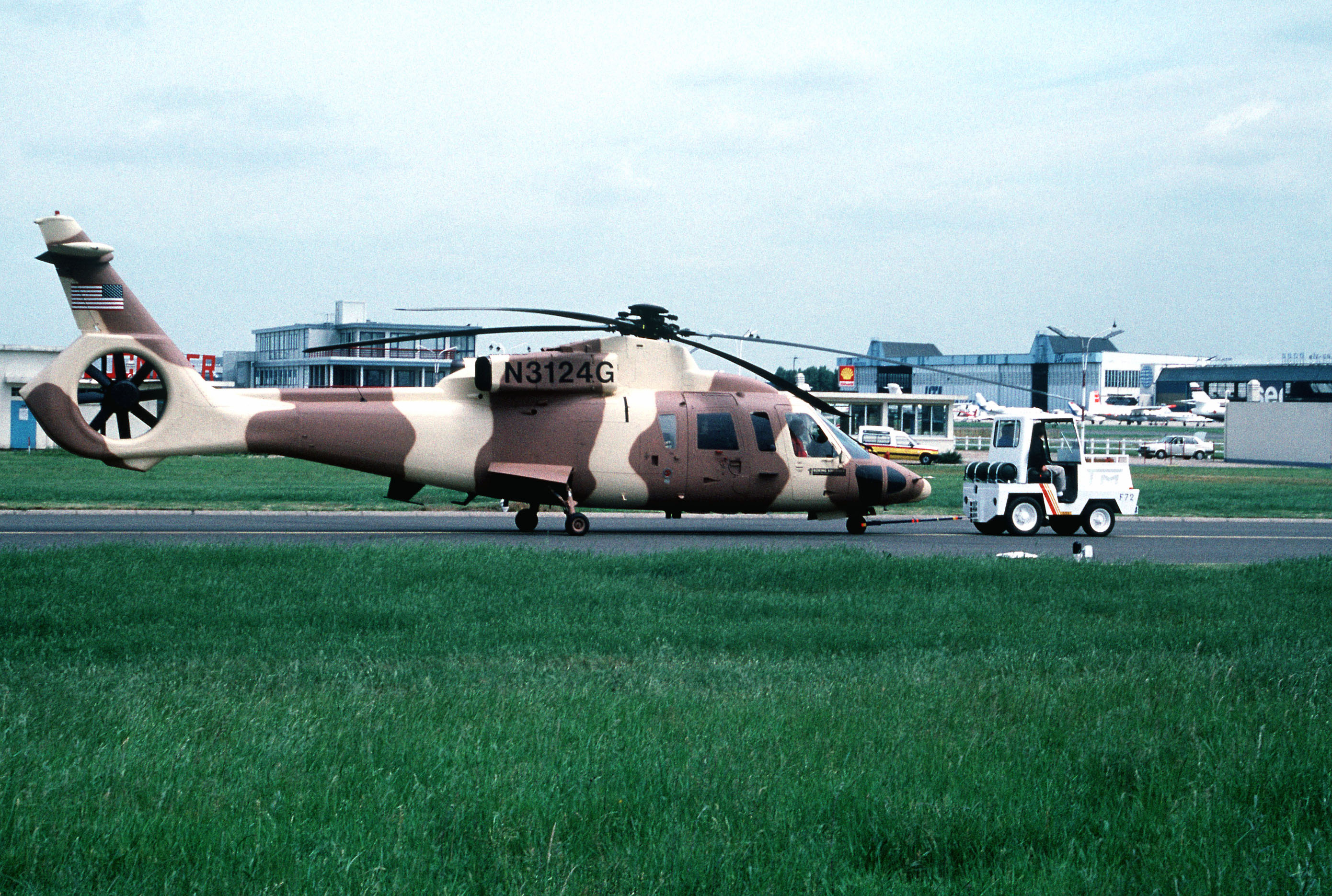
An S-76B prototype helicopter modified as a fantail demonstrator for the RAH-66 program at the 1991 Paris Air Show

Data from Sikorsky

General characteristics

- Crew: two (Note: Can operate with just one pilot in VFR conditions and in IFR when suitably equipped)
- Capacity: 13 passengers
- Length: 52 ft 6 in (16 m) from tip of main rotor to tip of tail rotor
- Width: 10 ft 0 in (3.05 m) at horizontal stabilizer
- Height: 14 ft 6 in (4.42 m) to tip of tail rotor
- Empty weight: 7,005 lb (3,177 kg) in utility configuration
- Gross weight: 11,700 lb (5,306 kg)
- Fuel capacity: 281 US gallons (1,064 liters), with 50 or 102 US gallons (189 or 386 liters) available in extra auxiliary tanks
- Powerplant: 2 × Turbomeca Arriel 2S2 turboshaft, 922 shp (688 kW) each
- Main rotor diameter: 44 ft 0 in (13.41 m)

Performance

- Maximum speed: 155 kn (178 mph, 287 km/h) at maximum takeoff weight at sea level in standard atmospheric conditions
- Cruise speed: 155 kn (178 mph, 287 km/h) maximum cruise speed is the same as maximum speed
- Range: 411 nmi (473 mi, 761 km) no reserves, at long-range cruise speed at 4,000 ft altitude
- Service ceiling: 13,800 ft (4,200 m)

Avionics

- Honeywell four-tube EFIS and Collins Proline II avionics suite
- Four-axis fully coupled autopilot
- Integrated Instrument Display System (IIDS)
- Honeywell ground proximity warning system
- Honeywell Primus weather radar
- Dual comm/nav radios
- Automatic direction finder
- Dual attitude and heading reference system and air data computers
- Radio altimeter
- Mode C transponder
- Dual VHF omnidirectional range (VOR) and Instrument landing system (ILS)
- Distance measuring equipment
- Cockpit voice recorder

== See also ==
Related development

- Sikorsky S-70
- Sikorsky S-75

Aircraft of comparable role, configuration, and era

- AgustaWestland AW109
- Airbus Helicopters H160
- Bell 222/230
- Bell 430
- Eurocopter AS365 Dauphin
- HAL Dhruv
- HAL Rudra
- Kamov Ka-60
- MBB Bo 105
- MBB/Kawasaki BK 117
- TAI T625 Gökbey

Related lists

- List of rotorcraft
