= Bell 222/230 =

Family of utility helicopters

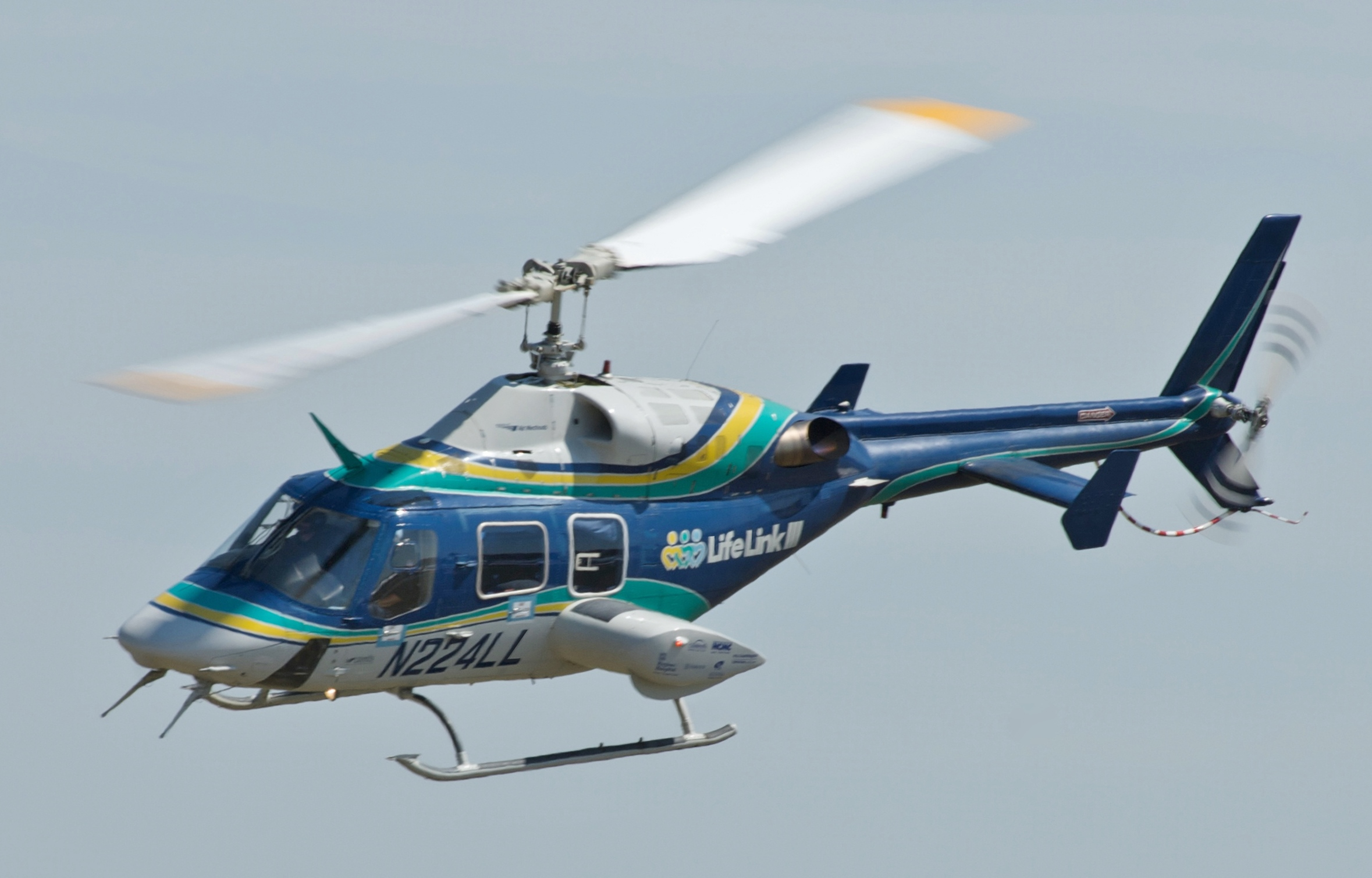
- A Bell 222U

General information
- Type: Executive/utility helicopter
- National origin: United States
- Manufacturer: Bell Helicopter
- Number built: Bell 222: 199; Bell 230: 38

History
- Manufactured: Bell 222: 1980–1991; Bell 230: 1992–1995
- Introduction date: Bell 222: 1979; Bell 230: 1991
- First flight: Bell 222: 13 August 1976; Bell 230: 12 August 1991
- Variant: Bell 430
- Developed into: Bell D-292

The Bell 222 is an American twin-engine light helicopter built by Bell Helicopter. The Bell 230 is an improved development with different engines and other minor changes.

== Development ==
=== Origins ===
In the late 1960s, Bell began designing a new twin-turbine engine light helicopter. A mockup of the new helicopter was displayed in January 1974 at a helicopter convention. Following interest at the convention, the company announced the new Bell 222. It was the first light commercial twin-turbine helicopter developed in the United States.

The Bell 222 incorporated a number of advanced features, including dual hydraulic and electrical systems, sponsons housing the retractable landing gear, and the Noda Matic vibration reduction system developed for the Bell 214ST.

Manufacturing began in 1975. The Model 222 first flew on August 13, 1976. It received certification from the Federal Aviation Administration (FAA) on August 16, 1979, and was approved for visual flight rules (VFR) use on December 20, 1979. Helicopter deliveries began on January 16, 1980. The FAA approved the 222 for single-pilot instrument flight rules (IFR) operation on May 15, 1980.

=== Improved versions ===
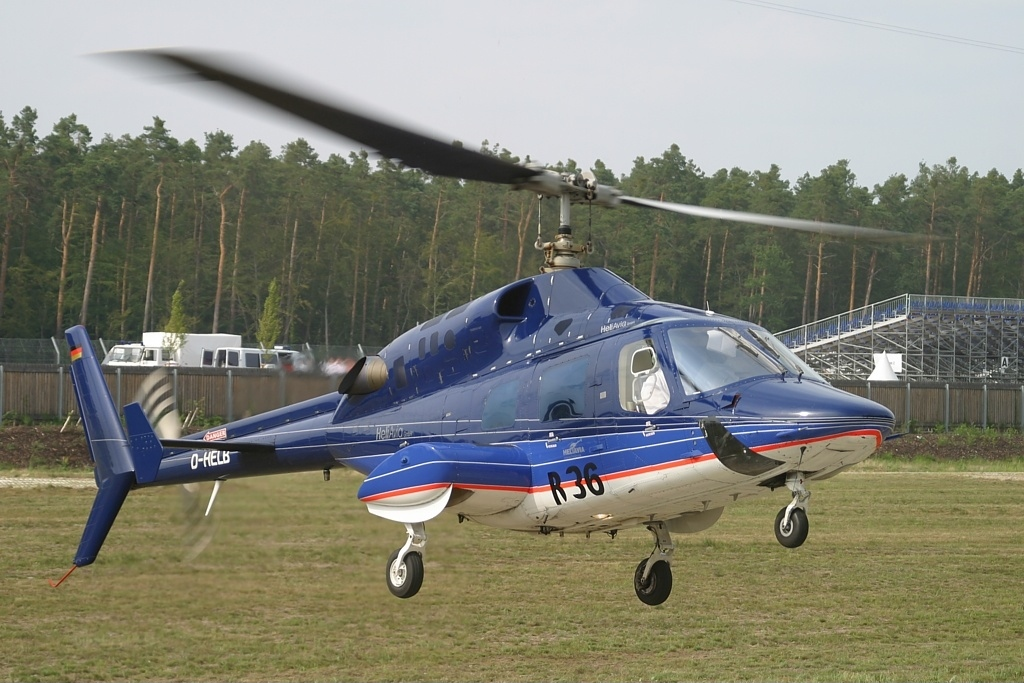
A Bell 222B

The more powerful Bell 222B was introduced in 1982 with a larger diameter main rotor. The 222B-based Bell 222UT Utility Twin, with skid landing gear, was introduced in 1983.

A development of the 222 is the Bell 230, with the 222's LTS 101 engines replaced by two Allison 250 turboshaft engines, plus other refinements. A converted 222 first flew as the prototype 230 on August 12, 1991. Transport Canada awarded certification in March 1992, and the first production 230 was delivered that November. The 230 had optional skid or wheel undercarriage. Production ended in 1995 with 38 having been built, being replaced in Bell's lineup by the stretched, more powerful Bell 430.

== Design ==
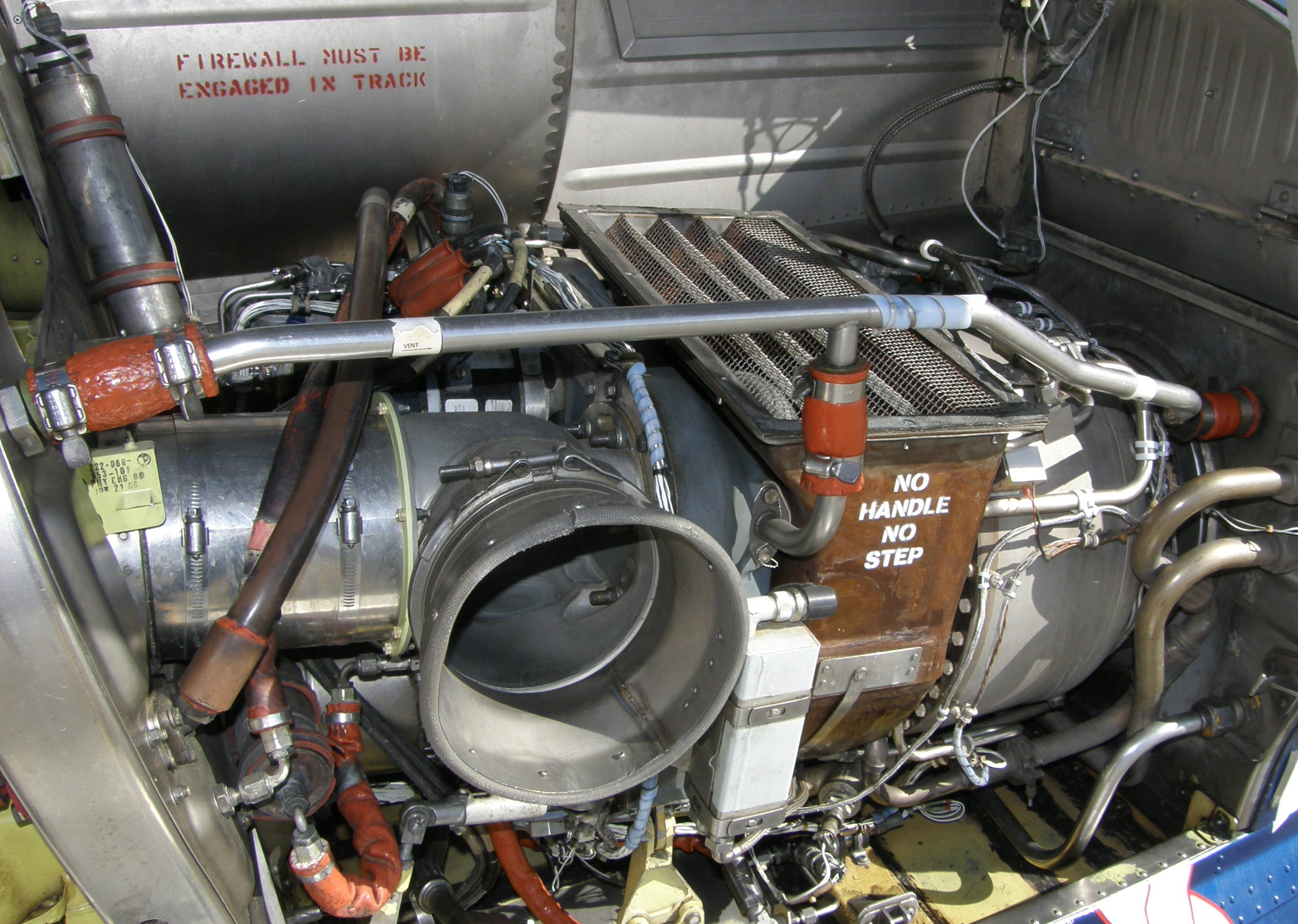
LTS 101-750 engine installation (left engine) in a 222U

The design includes two main rotor blades of stainless-steel-fiberglass construction and rotor hub with elastomeric bearings, which are lubricant free. Its cabin holds a maximum of ten persons with one-two pilots and eight to nine passengers. Seating configurations include standard seating for a pilot and seven passengers; or executive seating with one to two pilots and seating for five to six. The Bell 222 and 230 are usually flown single-pilot (optional dual controls are available), and can be configured for corporate/executive, EMS or utility transport missions.

The Bell 222 is powered by twin Lycoming/Honeywell LTS101-650 turboshaft engines, rated at 592 shp each. Later 222 versions feature more powerful engines. Engine output is at 100% of rating at 9598 RPM. Two independent driveshafts deliver power from the engines to the transmission. The Bell 222's LTS101 engine exhaust stacks are located at the rear of the engines, while the 230's Allison engine exhaust stacks are located high on the cowling. Fuel is stored in three tanks, one in the fuselage and one in each sponson. The main rear landing gear retracts into the sponsons.

The Bell 222's rotor systems include:

- Two-blade, semi-rigid high-kinetic energy main rotor with preconing and underslinging. The rotor head incorporates elastomeric bearings for hub springs, and flapping and pitch change bearings. The system is similar in design to that used by the AH-1 Cobra. Rotor speed at 100% engine speed is 348 RPM.
- All series models incorporate a pusher-type two-bladed tail rotor mounted on the left side of the tailboom, turning at 3396 RPM.

== Variants ==
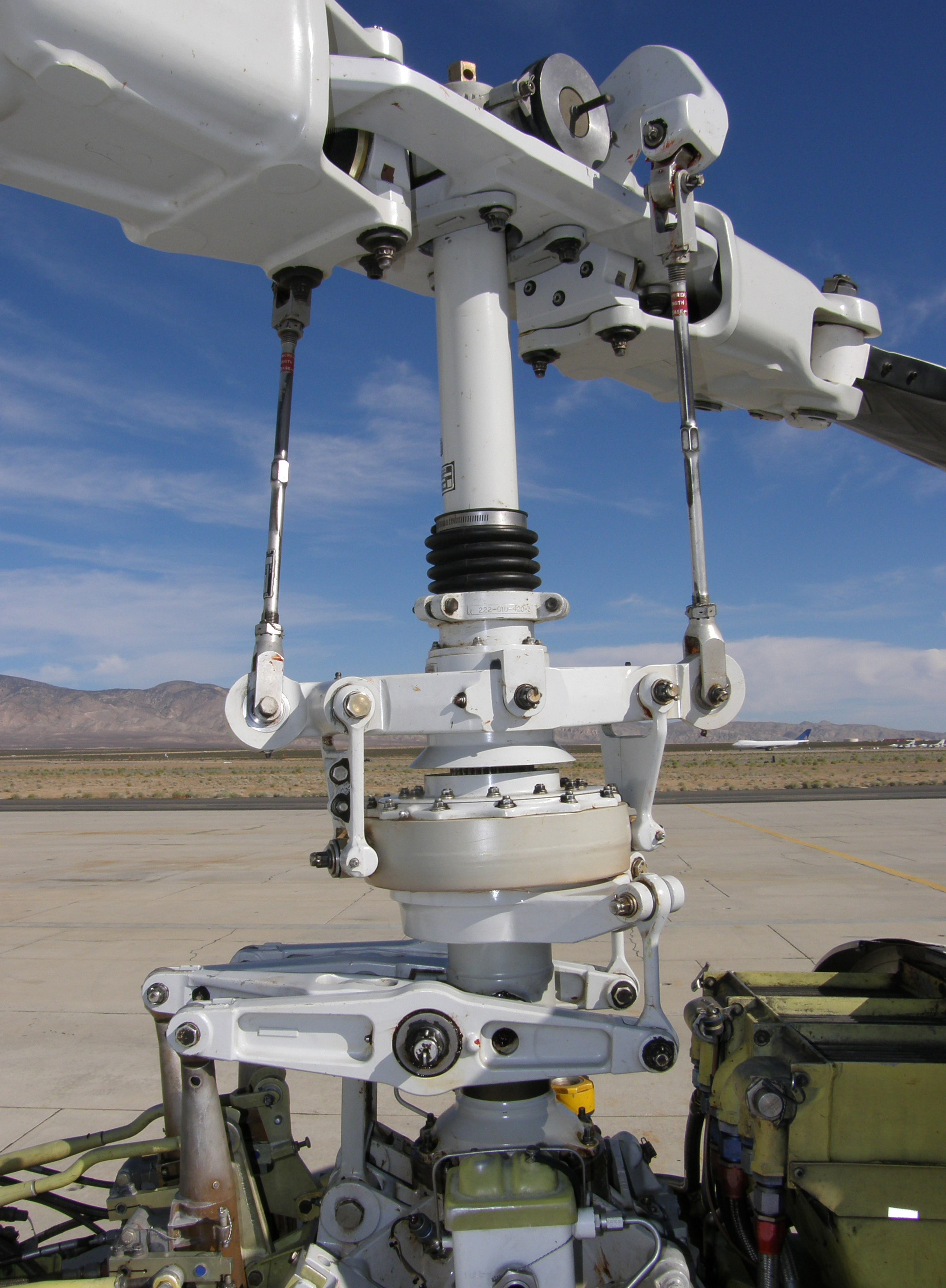
Bell 222U rotor head and flight controls

Bell 222
The original Model 222, sometimes unofficially called a Bell 222A to distinguish it from the Bell 222B. It was powered by two (618 hp takeoff rated, 591 hp max continuous rated) Honeywell (formerly Lycoming) LTS101-650C-3 turboshafts.
Bell 222B
In 1982 the 222 was given a power upgrade (two Honeywell (formerly Lycoming) LTS101-750Cs with takeoff rating of 680 hp each), a larger main rotor, and was renamed the Bell 222B.
Bell 222B Executive
This model had improved systems and a luxury interior.

Bell 222UT
A 222B variant with skids, introduced in 1983. The lack of retractable landing gear allowed for larger auxiliary fuel tanks.

Bell D-292
The Advanced Composite Airframe Program (ACAP) was a 1985 all-composite LHX proof-of-concept project. The Bell D-292 used the Avco Lycoming engines, transmission, two-bladed main and tail rotors, tailboom, vertical fin, and rotor pylon of the 222. The D-292 had a new composite airframe.

Bell 230
In 1991, the 222B design was updated, given more uprated engines, and renamed the Bell 230. Production ended in 1995.
Bell 230 Executive
Executive transport version.
Bell 230 Utility
Utility transport version.
Bell 230 EMS
Air ambulance version, equipped with one or two stretchers.

Bell 222SP
During the 1990s, some Bell 222s were modified with the 222B's engines and 230's Allison 250-C30G engines for improved single engine (engine-out) performance, and redesignated as 222SPs.

Bell 430
In 1995 the Bell 430, a stretched 230 (adding another seating row), was launched, with uprated engines and a four-blade main rotor.

== Operators ==
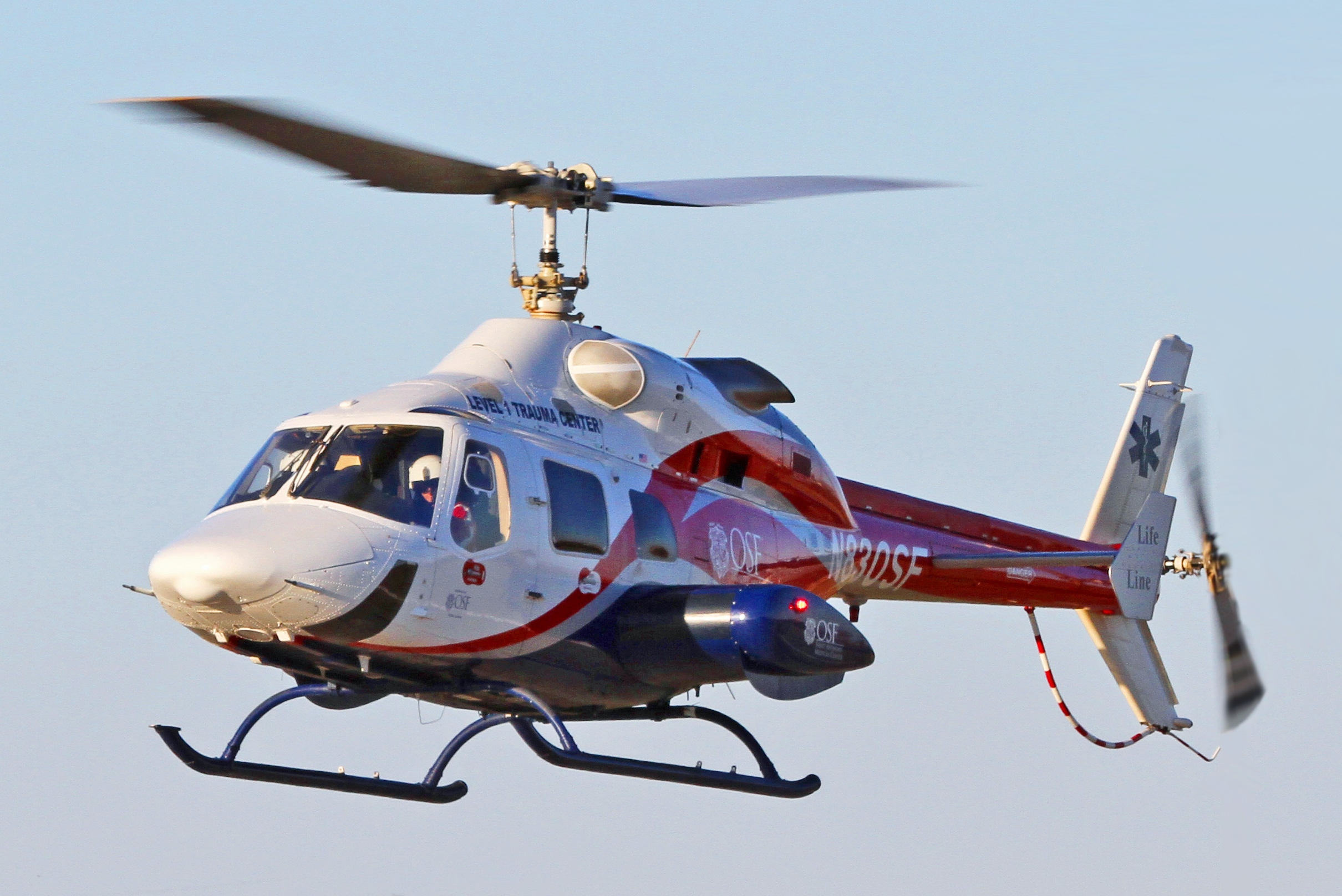
Bell 230 of Rotor-Lift Aviation at Agfest 2010

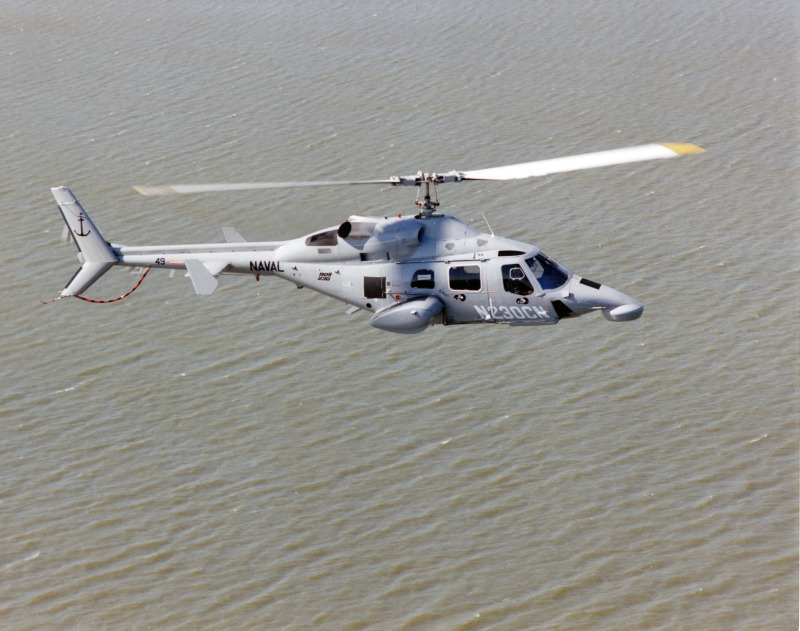
Bell 230 in markings of the Chilean Navy

The Bell 222 has seen service with a large number of civil operators, but only limited military service.

Albania

- Albtransport (crashed in 2006)

Jamaica

- JDF Air Wing

United States

- Mercy Air

=== Former operators ===
India

- Government of Uttar Pradesh: Operated a Bell 230 between 1995 and 2015. Replaced by the Bell 412EP.

=== Evaluation only ===
Chile

- Chilean Navy – 1 (tested in 1994, unit later returned to manufacturer).

Ecuador

- Ecuadorian Navy – 1 (evaluated in 1994)

== Specifications ==
Bell 222 3-view drawing

Model	222	222B	222U	230
Announced	1974	1982	1982	1990
First Flight	August 13, 1976	1982	1983	August 12, 1991
Certified	December 1979	August 1982	April 1983	March 1992
Delivered	1980	1982	1983	November 1992
Seats	Front: pilot + one. Main: four–six (depending on seat types); Maximum ten (pilot and nine passengers)			
Height	11 ft 8 in (3.56 m)		12 ft 2 in (3.71 m)	11 ft 8 in (3.56 m)
Fuselage length	42 ft 2 in (12.85 m)		42 ft 11 in (12.78 m)	42 ft 3 in (12.88 m)
Rotor diameter	39 ft 9 in (12.12 m)	42 ft (12.80 m)		
Length overall	49 ft 6 in (15.1 m)	50 ft 3 in (15.32 m)		
Engine (2x)	Lycoming LTS101-650C-3	Lycoming LTS101-750C		Rolls-Royce 250-C30G/2
Power (2x)	620 shp (462 kW)	684 shp (510 kW)		700 hp (520 kW)
Max speed	133 kn (153 mph; 246 km/h) (cruise)	135 kt (155 mph, 250 km/h)		140 kt (161 mph, 260 km/h)
Climb rate	1,600 ft/min (8.1 m/s)	1,730 ft/min (8.79 m/s)		~1,600 ft/min (8.13 m/s)
Service ceiling	20,000 ft (6,100 m)	15,800 ft (4,816 m)		15,500 ft (4,724 m)
Hover ceiling	4,200 ft (1,300 m)	10,300 ft (3,139 m)		12,400 ft (3,780 m)
Fuel capacity	188+48 US gal (710+182 L)		188+122 US gal (710+460 L)	188+ US gal (710+ L)
Range	282 nmi (325 mi; 522 km)	378 nmi (434 mi, 700 km)	486 nmi (559 mi, 900 km)	378 nmi (434 mi, 700 km)
Empty weight	4,860 lb (2,200 kg)	4,577 lb (2,076 kg)	4,537 lb (2,058 kg)	5,097 lb (2,312 kg)
Maximum takeoff weight	8,100 lb (3,670 kg) (external load)	8,250 lb (3,742 kg)		8,400 lb (3,810 kg)

Sources: Airliners.net, Helicopterdirect, others

== See also ==
Related development

- Bell 206
- Bell 412
- Bell 427
- Bell 430
- Bell D-292 ACAP

Aircraft of comparable role, configuration, and era

- Agusta A109
- Eurocopter Dauphin
- Sikorsky S-76

== Bibliography ==
- Elliott, Bryn (May–June 1999). "On the Beat: The First 60 Years of Britain's Air Police, Part Two". Air Enthusiast (81): 64–69. ISSN 0143-5450.
- Bell 222/230 Field Maintenance Training Manual
- Bell 222U Rotorcraft Flight Manual
- Taylor, John W. R., ed. (1982). Jane's All the World's Aircraft 1982–83. London: Jane's Yearbooks. ISBN 0-7106-0748-2.
- Taylor, John W. R., ed. (1988). Jane's All the World's Aircraft 1988–89. London: Jane's Defence Data. ISBN 0-7106-0867-5.
