= Norrlandsflyg =

Swedish helicopter operator

Norrlandsflyg AB
IATA	ICAO	Call sign
-	HMF	LIFEGUARD SWEDEN
- Founded: 1961
- Ceased operations: 2011
- Fleet size: 12
- Headquarters: Gothenburg, Sweden
- Website: www.norrlandsflyg.se

Norrlandsflyg AB was a Swedish helicopter operator which provided search and rescue under contract with the Swedish Maritime Administration and air ambulance services for Västra Götaland County. The company had its headquarters and technical base at Göteborg City Airport (Säve) and helicopters stationed in Gällivare, Gothenburg, Ronneby, Sundsvall, Stockholm, and Visby. Norrlandsflyg operated twelve Sikorsky S-76 helicopters.

According to the helicopter enthusiast website Nordic Rotors, the services were fully taken over in 2011 by the Swedish Maritime Administration.

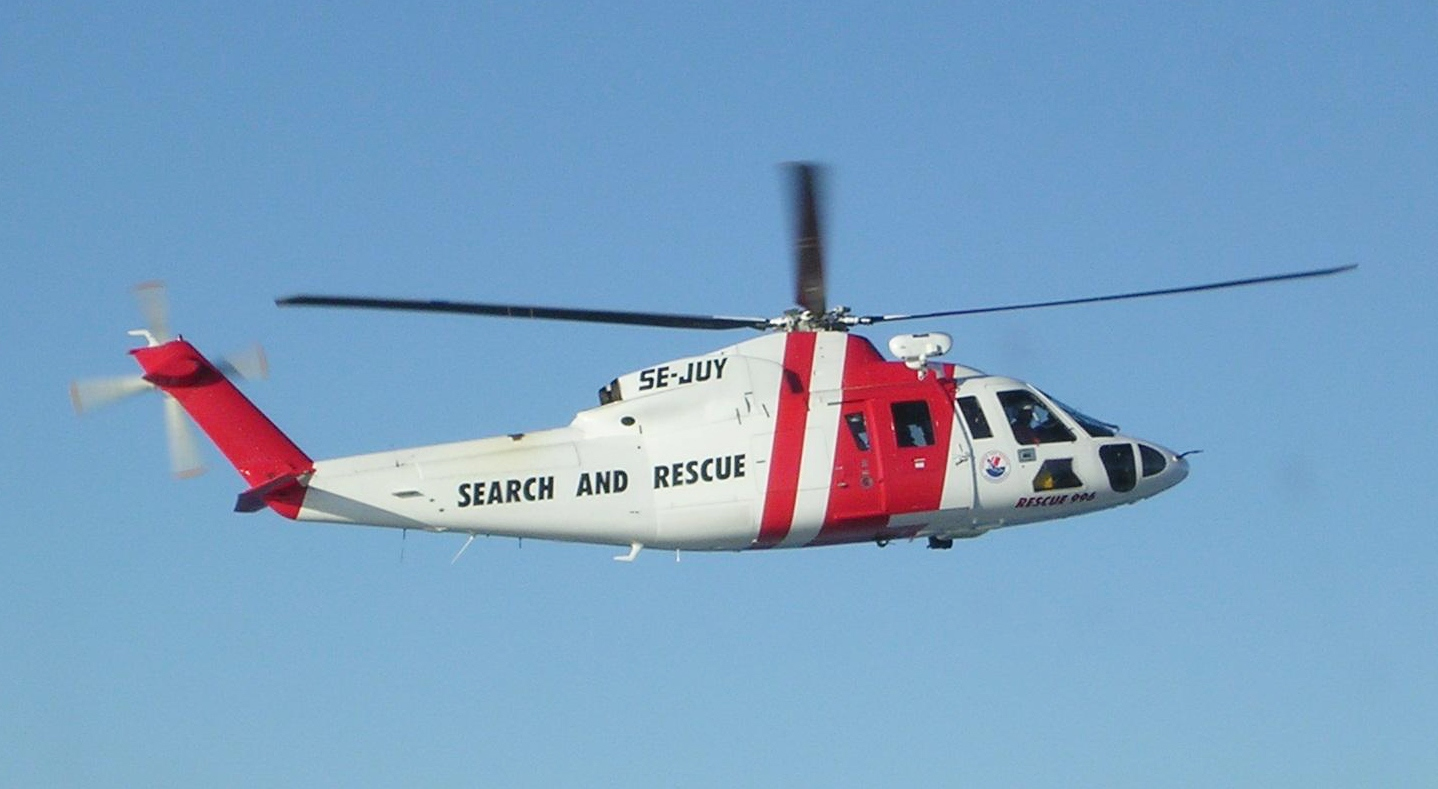
S-76C search and rescue helicopter operated by Norrlandsflyg
