= Boeing–Sikorsky RAH-66 Comanche =

Attack helicopter prototype (1996–2004)

RAH-66 Comanche
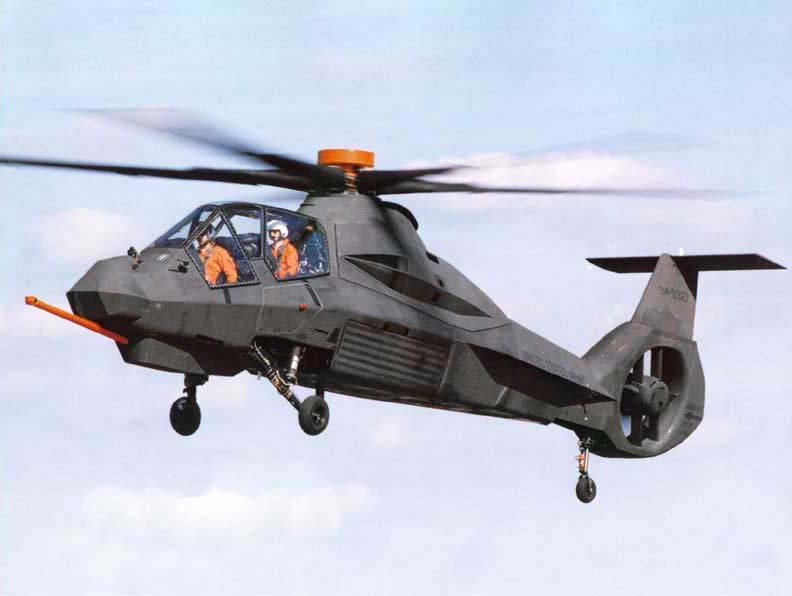
- The first RAH-66 prototype

General information
- Type: Reconnaissance and attack helicopter
- National origin: United States
- Manufacturer: Boeing Helicopters/Sikorsky Aircraft
- Status: Cancelled in 2004
- Primary user: United States Army
- Number built: 2

History
- First flight: 4 January 1996

The Boeing–Sikorsky RAH-66 Comanche is an American stealth armed reconnaissance and attack helicopter designed for the United States Army. Following decades of study and development, the RAH-66 program was cancelled in 2004 before mass production began, by which point nearly US$7 billion had been spent on the program.

During the early 1980s, the U.S. Army started to formulate requirements for the replacement of its helicopters then in service, which resulted in the launch of the Light Helicopter Experimental (LHX) program. Nearly a decade later, following the refinement of requirements, evaluation of submissions, and the rebranding of the program as the Light Helicopter (LH) program, during April 1991, the Army announced the selection of the Boeing–Sikorsky team's design as the contest winner, shortly after which a contract for construction of prototypes was awarded. The Comanche was to incorporate several advanced elements, such as stealth technologies, and a number of previously untried design features. Operationally, it was to employ advanced sensors in its reconnaissance role, in which it was intended to designate targets for the AH-64 Apache. It was also armed with one rotary cannon and could carry missiles and rockets in internal bays and optionally on stub wings for light attack duties.

Two RAH-66 prototypes were constructed and underwent flight testing between 1996 and 2004. On 1 June 2000, the program entered its $3.1 billion engineering and manufacturing development (EMD) phase. However, during 2002, the Comanche program underwent heavy restructuring; the number of Comanches that were to be purchased was cut to 650. At the time, the projected total cost for the full production of the Comanche in such numbers stood at $26.9 billion. As early as the late 1990s, the Government Accountability Office (GAO) had reported that it had "serious doubts" about the program, observing that the Comanche would "consume almost two thirds of the whole Aviation budget by Fiscal Year 2008". Multiple government agencies had acted to cut the number of Comanches on order, but, as a consequence of the heavy reductions to the numbers to be procured, the unit costs soared.

On 23 February 2004, the U.S. Army announced the termination of the Comanche program, stating they had determined that the RAH-66 would require numerous upgrades to be viable on the battlefield and that the service would instead direct the bulk of its rotary systems funds to renovating its existing attack, utility, and reconnaissance helicopters. The Army also announced new plans to accelerate the development of unmanned aerial vehicles (UAVs), which could also perform the scouting role intended for the Comanche, but with less risk. Since program cancellation, both of the prototypes have been placed on public display.

== Development ==
=== Origins and LHX ===
During 1982, the U.S. Army initiated the Light Helicopter Experimental (LHX) program with the aim of producing a replacement for several existing rotorcraft, including the UH-1, AH-1, OH-6, and OH-58 helicopters. Then in 1988 a formal request for proposal (RFP) was issued to various manufacturers; the requirement had evolved into a battlefield reconnaissance helicopter by this time. In October 1988, the Army announced two teams, these being Boeing–Sikorsky and Bell–McDonnell Douglas, received contracts to further develop their concepts. During the 1990s, the program's name was changed from LHX to simply Light Helicopter (LH). In April 1991, the Army awarded the Boeing–Sikorsky team a $2.8 billion contract to complete six prototypes. Later that month the helicopter was officially named RAH-66 Comanche.

During November 1993, assembly of the first prototype commenced at Sikorsky's facility in Stratford, Connecticut and at Boeing's manufacturing plant in Philadelphia, Pennsylvania. Later all of the rotorcraft's sub-assemblies were transferred to the former location where final assembly occurred. In December 1994, the Department of Defense reduced the number of planned prototypes to two as the services shifted budgets to pay for increased troop salaries. On 25 May 1995, the first Comanche prototype was formally rolled out at Sikorsky's production facility, after which it was transferred to West Palm Beach, Florida to commence flight testing activities. On 4 January 1996, the prototype Comanche, flown by test pilots Bob Gradle and Rus Stiles, performed its 39-minute maiden flight. The first flight had been originally planned to take place during August 1995, but had been delayed by a number of structural and software problems that had been encountered. On 30 March 1999, the second prototype conducted its first flight, before joining the flight test program shortly thereafter.

=== Prototype testing ===
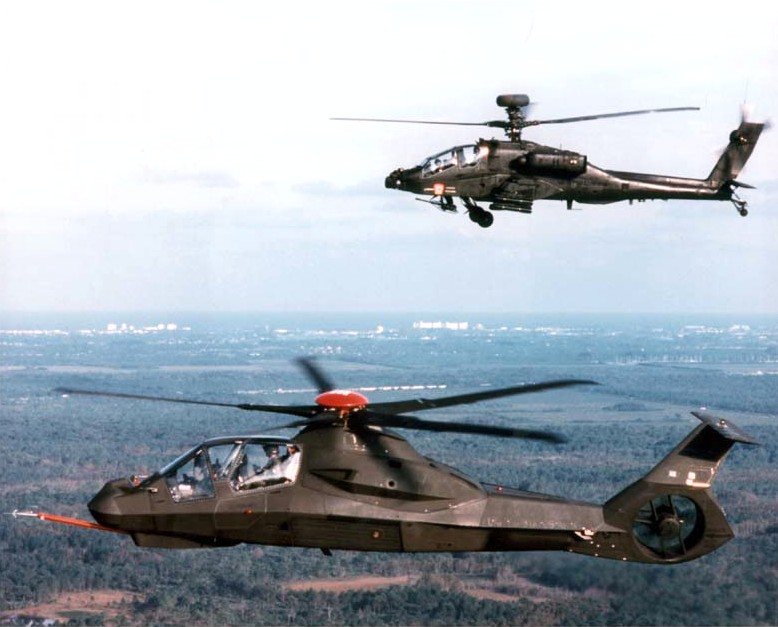
An RAH-66 Comanche flying in formation with an AH-64 Apache. Part of the Comanche's planned role was to designate targets for the Apache.

The flight test program was conducted using the pair of prototypes produced, which had been assigned the serial numbers 94-0327 and 95-0001. Following a demonstration of its ability to meet certain key criteria, on 1 June 2000, the RAH-66 entered the $3.1 billion engineering and manufacturing development (EMD) phase of the program. Through the early 2000s, the U.S. Army maintained its plans for the intended purchase of over 1,200 Comanches, which were to fill both the scout helicopter and light attack roles; as late as 2003, it was being anticipated that deliveries of operational RAH-66s would commence as scheduled during 2006.

During late 2000, it was revealed that an effort to reduce the Comanche's empty weight by approximately 200 lb (91 kg) or 2.1 percent in order to conform with its established target weight had been initiated. The first Comanche prototype (serial 94-0327), completed 318 flights over 387 hours before reaching the end of its testing career during January 2002. The second prototype (serial 95-0001), had accumulated 103.5 flight hours and 93 sorties by May 2001. During late 2001 and early 2002, testing with the second RAH-66 was halted while the aircraft underwent extensive modifications, received both mission equipment and more powerful engines, which were added on 1 June 2001 with a pair 17% more powerful LHTEC 1,563 shp (1,165.5 kW) T800-LHT-801 turboshaft engines, compared to the previous 1,340 shp (1,002 kW) T800-LHT-800 engines. All U.S. Army Comanches were set to use the pair of 801 engines. On 23 May 2002, the second prototype re-commenced flight testing with the additional equipment fitted. Accordingly, the expanded test program involved new aspects such as the testing of the armaments and night vision systems; these test flights continued into 2003. During testing, the Comanche was recorded as having attained a cruise speed of 162 knots (186 mph; 300 km/h), as well as having achieved a "dash speed" of 172 knots (198 mph; 319 km/h). It also demonstrated ability to perform a 180° turn in under five seconds.

During 2002, the Comanche program underwent heavy restructuring; consequently, the planned number of Comanches to be purchased was decreased to 650 rotorcraft. At the time, the projected total cost for the full production of the Comanche in such numbers stood at $26.9 billion. Originally, the EMD phase was to last for six years with five Comanches to be constructed for the testing regime. During 2003, production on the third RAH-66, which was to be the first EMD-conformant helicopter, was started. Subsequently, eight RAH-66s were to be constructed for operational testing purposes. The initial production RAH-66s were to be completed in a Block I configuration that included the majority of the rotorcraft's planned weapons and sensors. From the 16th Comanche onwards, deliveries would have been made to the Block II standard with all of the planned capabilities.

=== Cancellation ===
On 23 February 2004, the U.S. Army announced that they had decided to terminate all work on the Comanche program. At the time, it was stated that the Army had determined that a number of upgrades would be necessary in order for the RAH-66 to be capable of surviving on the battlefield in the face of current anti-aircraft threats; however, the Army had instead decided to re-direct the bulk of its funding for rotary development toward the renovation of its existing helicopter fleet of attack, utility, and reconnaissance aircraft. Specifically, the Army also had plans to reuse the funds allocated to the Comanche program to speed up development of unmanned aerial vehicles (UAVs), which could also perform the scouting role intended for the vehicle. At the time of its termination, the Comanche program had reportedly spent US$6.9 billion. The contract termination fees involved were estimated to total US$450–680 million for the main program partners Sikorsky and Boeing.

Subsequently, the Army decided to pursue development of another battlefield scout helicopter under the Armed Reconnaissance Helicopter program; this resulted in another rotorcraft, designated as the Bell ARH-70, being selected and developed with the intention to replace the OH-58D in place of the Comanche. However, on 16 October 2008, the Department of Defense notified Congress and Bell that it was canceling the program, reportedly due to cost overruns on its development.

A multitude of reasons contributed to the ultimate cancellation of the RAH-66 program. According to aviation author James Williams, efforts to speed up the program via the elimination of risk-mitigation measures and the stream of continuous adjustments to account for annual budget cuts to the rotorcraft resulted in the formation of a negative cycle that functioned to greatly extend the rotorcraft's development schedule. Over the course of the Comanche's development, multiple government agencies had acted to cut the number of helicopters that were intended to be ordered; one particularly common basis for such curtailments was that the Cold War had ended and thus such quantities were unnecessary (a phenomenon known as the "peace dividend"). However, significant reductions in volume directly resulted in the rapid climbs in the projections of the Comanche's unit cost; in turn, this stimulated and gave validity to critics of the program, such as the Army Acquisition Executive James Ambrose, who had prominently declared that the Army would not receive any aircraft "costing a dollar over $7.5 million".

As early as 1995, it is claimed by Williams that the Comanche had been facing complete cancellation as a choice between which defense development programs were to be scrapped. During mid-1999, the Comanche was subject to substantial governmental scrutiny; the Government Accountability Office (GAO) reported that it had "serious doubts" about the program and noted that the Comanche would "consume almost two thirds of the whole Aviation budget by Fiscal Year 2008". In addition, wartime experiences, such as from the Kosovo War, had led to some senior figures within the Army to place a greater emphasis on the use of unmanned platforms for conducting many of the same roles for which the Comanche was being developed to perform. By 2000, Williams postulates that the primary reason for retaining the program was out of concern for the state of the helicopter industry—Sikorsky's production and employment figures were at their lowest for decades and the contract was considered critical.

Author Fred Brooks criticized the program's requirement for the Comanche to be capable of ferrying itself across the Atlantic as an example of excessive requirements being present in a project's design phase and of their costly repercussions. Williams observes that the Comanche's weight requirements were unachievable, and claimed that this was due to poor management, in which no party was allegedly aware of or in control of the rotorcraft's final weight; there were concerns that, when outfitted with actual equipment required for operations, the Comanche's engines would be incapable of lifting the total weight of the helicopter. Additionally, it has been claimed that it proved difficult to convince the Army that the program suffered from serious troubles while key individuals failed to realize the existence of insurmountable technical problems. Prized elements of the program, such as certain software capabilities and its integration, failed to foster confidence with Army overseers; several capabilities were viewed as having been unproven and risky, while the anticipated consumption of up to 40 percent of the aviation budget by the Comanche alone for a number of years was considered to be extreme. According to Williams, it was concluded that the Army's aviation budget would be better spent on the delivery of less risky and more critical needs.

In a report published during 2008, the GAO recorded that an Army spokesperson had stated that "the program's costs could no longer be justified". Author Cindy Williams stated of the Comanche: "The rationale for cutting Comanche... is twofold. First, the doctrinal niche that the Comanche occupies is unnecessary in the near term and probably not viable in the longer term. Secondly, as with all rotary-wing aircraft, the Comanche is a voracious consumer of strategic airlift."

The manufacturing team, Sikorsky and Boeing, have attributed factors that were outside of their control, such as budget cuts, "requirement creep", and a protracted development period, to have caused problems with the program, rather than dysfunctionality on their part. Under the Comanche program, each company was responsible for the construction of different elements of the rotorcraft. Since the termination, both companies have decided to team up again to produce a jointly developed prototype, designated as the SB-1 Defiant, for the Army's Future Vertical Lift (FVL) program.

== Design ==
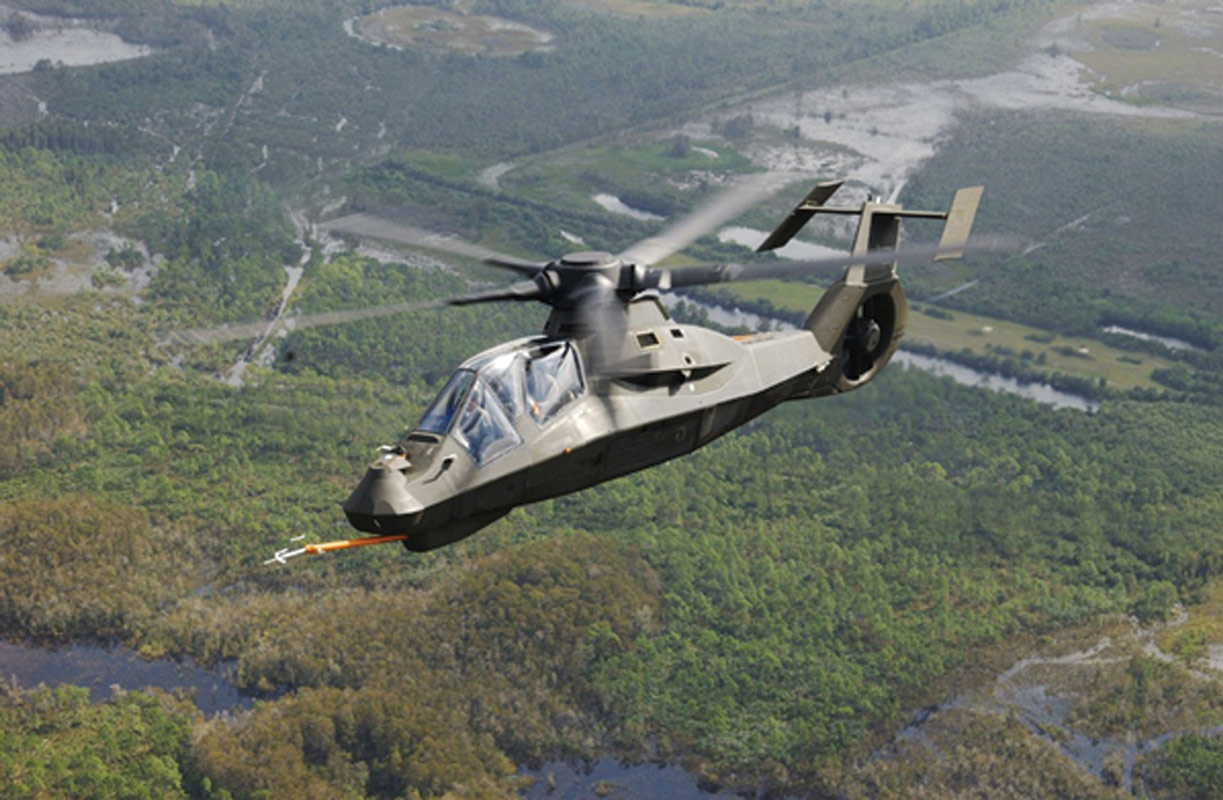
RAH-66 prototype in 1997

The Comanche was intended to be an advanced armed reconnaissance and attack helicopter. The Comanche was specifically tailored to the role of armed scout to replace the U.S. Army's OH-58D Kiowa Warrior, which is an upgraded version of a Vietnam War-era observation helicopter. It was both smaller and lighter than the AH-64 Apache attack helicopter that it had been intended to accompany. The RAH-66 was powered by a pair of LHTEC T800 turboshaft engines, each capable of generating up to 1,563 hp (1,165 kW) of power. The RAH-66's fuselage was 43 feet (13 m) long and composed of composite materials; it was designed to be capable of fitting more readily onto transport ships, enabling the Comanche to be more rapidly deployed to flash points and other rapidly developing situations. However, in the event of strategic transport assets not being available, the helicopter's ferry range of 1,200 nmi (2,200 km) would have allowed it to fly itself to battlefields overseas on its own.

As intended, it would have functioned as a stealth helicopter, incorporating a number of different techniques and technologies in order to reduce its radar cross-section (RCS) along with other areas of visibility and detectability. The exterior surfaces of the RAH-66 were faceted and covered with both radar-absorbent material (RAM) coatings and infrared-suppressant paint; as a result of these combined measures, the Comanche's RCS was stated to be 360 times smaller than that of the AH-64 Apache. The acoustic signature of the helicopter was also reported to be noticeably lower than that of comparable helicopters; this reduction had been partially achieved through the adoption of an all-composite five-blade main rotor and pioneering canted tail rotor assembly.

As intended, the Comanche was to be equipped with sophisticated avionics, including navigation and detection systems, which would have enabled operations at night and in inclement weather. Its primary mission was scouting using its advanced sensors, in particular locating and designating targets for attack helicopters, such as the AH-64 Apache, to strike. The Comanche was furnished with a digital fly-by-wire flight control system. Each of the two crew members were to be provided with a pair of multi-functional LCDs in addition to the Helmet-Integrated Display and Sight System (HIDSS).

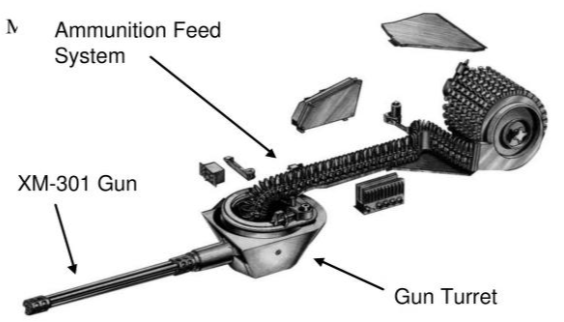
The RAH-66 Comanche XM-301 rotary cannon; turreted gun system

For the light attack role, the RAH-66 was to be furnished with various armaments. It was equipped with a single chin-mounted 20 mm three-barrel XM301 rotary cannon, which could be pointed rearwards and retracted under a fairing when not in use to decrease the helicopter's radar cross-section. In addition, the RAH-66 was capable of internally carrying a maximum of six AGM-114 Hellfire air-to-ground missiles or up to twelve AIM-92 Stinger air-to-air missiles, which would be evenly divided between a pair of retractable weapons pylons. Beyond storing munitions internally, the Comanche could also mount external stub wings to carry up to eight Hellfire missiles or sixteen Stinger missiles. However, operations performing with armaments mounted externally would reduce the effectiveness of the Comanche's stealth technologies.

In 2001, the Army sought to procure a "heavy attack" variant of the Comanche, which was intended to begin replacing Apaches in 2025.

== Aircraft on display ==
Both prototype airframes, 94-0327 and 95-0001, are located at the United States Army Aviation Museum at Fort Rucker, Alabama.

== Specifications (RAH-66A) ==
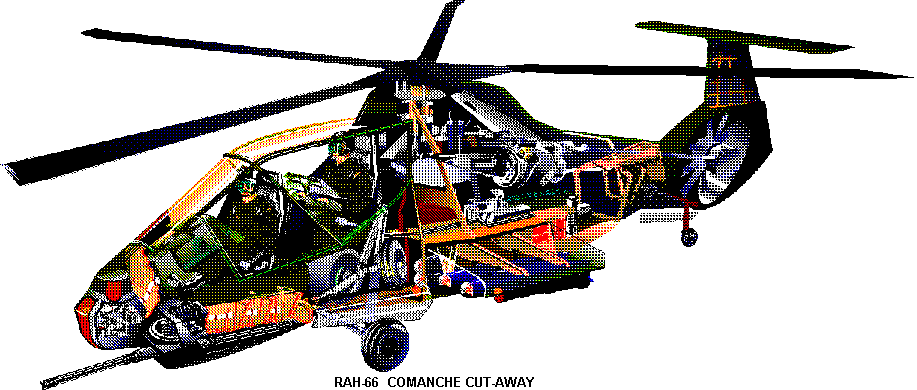
A cutaway drawing of a RAH-66 Comanche

Data from Jane's All the World's Aircraft 2005–2006, Frawley, Boeing and Sikorsky, Bonds and Miller

General characteristics

- Crew: 2
- Length: 46 ft 10.25 in (14.2812 m)
- Width: 6 ft 8.25 in (2.0384 m) maximum fuselage width
- Height: 11 ft 0.75 in (3.3719 m)
- Empty weight: 9,300 lb (4,218 kg)
- Gross weight: 12,349 lb (5,601 kg)
- Max takeoff weight: 17,408 lb (7,896 kg) maximum fuel for self-deployment
- Fuel capacity: 301.6 US gal (251.1 imp gal; 1,142 L) internal fuel + 2x 450 US gal (370 imp gal; 1,700 L) drop tank + 2x 112 US gal (93 imp gal; 420 L) optional side weapon bay tanks; Total 1,201.6 US gal (1,000.5 imp gal; 4,549 L) / 1,425.6 US gal (1,187.1 imp gal; 5,396 L) with weapon bay tanks
- Powerplant: 2 × LHTEC T800-LHT-801 turboshaft engines, 1,563 shp (1,166 kW) each
- Main rotor diameter: 40 ft 0 in (12.19 m)
- Main rotor area: 1,257.14 sq ft (116.792 m^{2}) 5-bladed main rotor with fenestron tail rotor
- Blade sections: - root: Boeing VR-12; tip: Sikorsky SSC-A09

Performance

- Maximum speed: 175 kn (201 mph, 324 km/h) without mast radar

166 kn (191 mph; 307 km/h) with mast radar

- Cruise speed: 165 kn (190 mph, 306 km/h) without mast radar

149 kn (171 mph; 276 km/h) with mast radar

- Range: 262 nmi (302 mi, 485 km)
- Combat range: 150 nmi (170 mi, 280 km) internal fuel
- Ferry range: 1,200 nmi (1,400 mi, 2,200 km)
- Endurance: 2 hours 30 minutes on internal fuel
- Service ceiling: 14,980 ft (4,570 m)
- g limits: +3.5 -1
- Rate of climb: 895 ft/min (4.55 m/s) without mast radar

500 ft/min (152.4 m/min) with mast radar

- Disk loading: 13.8473 lb/sq ft (67.608 kg/m^{2}) YRAH-66
- Power/mass: 0.13 hp/lb (0.21 kW/kg) at MTOW, take-off power

Armament

- 1× Turreted Gun System with a 20 mm XM301 three-barrel rotary cannon (capacity: 500 rounds)
- Internal bays: 6× AGM-114 Hellfire air-to-ground missiles, or 12× AIM-92 Stinger air-to-air missiles, or 24× 2.75 in (70 mm) Hydra 70 air-to-ground rockets
- Optional stub wings: 8× Hellfires, 16× Stingers, or 56× Hydra 70 rockets

Avionics

- Miniaturised Longbow radar
- Litton laser ring gyro and GPS Nav/Attack system

== See also ==
- Comanche video game series, inspired by the RAH-66 Comanche
- Enemy Engaged: RAH-66 Comanche vs. KA-52 Hokum, a simulation game released in 2000 that is still maintained by enthusiasts
- U.S. helicopter armament subsystems

Aircraft of comparable role, configuration, and era

- Bell 360 Invictus
- Bell OH-58X
- Eurocopter Tiger ARH

Aircraft with similar composite build

- Sikorsky S-75
- Bell D-292
- Bell Boeing V-22 Osprey
