= Bell D-292 =

1985 experimental helicopter model

D-292
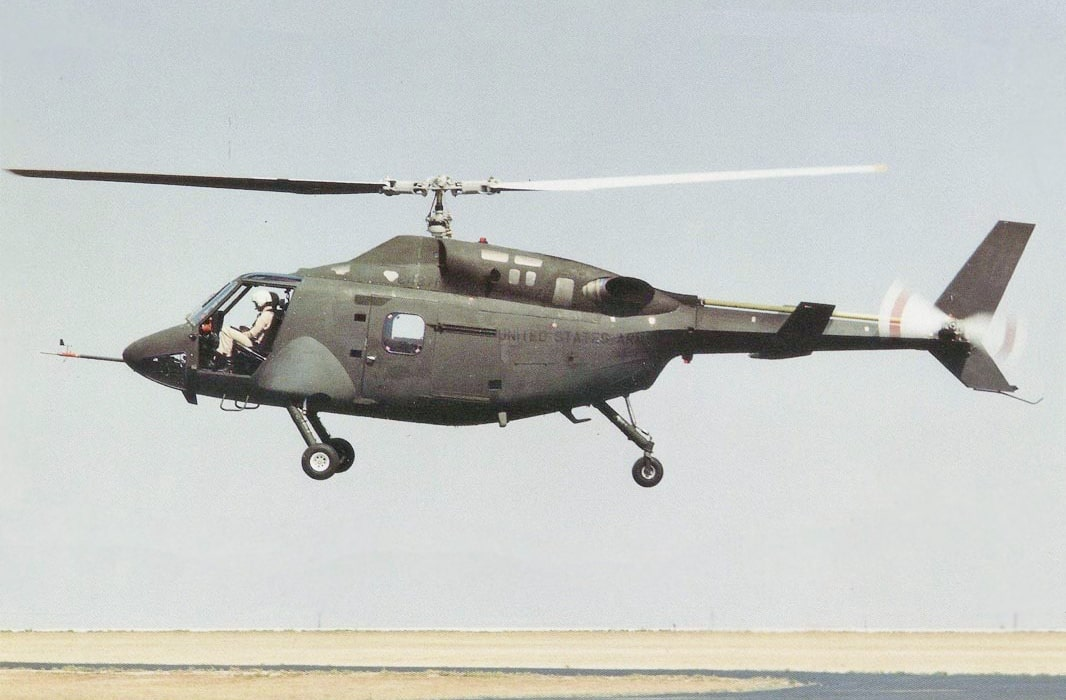
- The U.S. Army Bell D-292 conducting a flight test

General information
- Type: Experimental helicopter
- National origin: United States
- Manufacturer: Bell Helicopter
- Number built: 1

History
- First flight: 30 August 1985
- Developed from: Bell 222

The Bell D-292 was an American experimental helicopter developed by Bell Helicopters for the United States Army Advanced Composite Airframe Program (ACAP), as part of the studies involved in the Light Helicopter Experimental (LHX) program. It had a gross weight of 7525 lbs. The program was intended to demonstrate the advantageous application of advanced composite materials and structural design concepts on the airframe of military helicopters. The primary goal was to reduce the cost of production of the airframes, and reduce their weight by 17%-22% respectively. The airframe cost $185,458. Materials made up 28% of this cost, and labor expenses the remaining 72%.

== Design and development ==
The Bell D-292 was developed under the US Army's Advanced Composite Airframe Program (ACAP), which was a project to develop an all-composite helicopter fuselage, considerably lighter and less costly to build than predominantly metal airframes, in support of the LHX program. In February 1981, contracts were awarded to Sikorsky and Bell Helicopters, with Sikorsky submitting the S-75. Both companies were to build three airframes, one tool-proof version, one static-test version and a flight-test vehicle.

The design of the airframes produced for ACAP were primarily designed to fulfill the crashworthiness requirements of MIL-STD-1290. Significant portions of the cockpit, cabin, and other sections were built to fulfill these requirements. The tail sections were designed by the flight loads present in an airframe with a damaged condition, while the door, fairings, and portions of the empennage were designed around airloads.

The structure of the airframe was made of a variety of different materials including graphite, Kevlar, fiberglass, epoxy, and polymides. The structural configuration included skins, stiffened panels, solid laminates, sandwich beams, frames, and longerons. Graphite was utilized where strength and stiffness were required, such as the load bearing longerons, frames, and beams. Kevlar was primarily used for the skin panels. Fiberglass was used on surfaces that were expected to face high amounts of wear and tear, such as floors. Some parts such as door latches and fasteners were not practical to be made of composite materials, and as such were made out of standard material parts.

In testing, the D-292 was subject to 8 different static test conditions: Symmetrical pull out, 15° yaw left return, 15° yaw right return, vertical jump takeoff, 20fps 2 point landing, Vertical fin 15° yaw trim, 15° yaw trim on the horizontal stabilizer, and symmetrical pull out on the horizontal stabilizer. The aircraft demonstrated its capability to travel at 120kts in forward flight, 35kts in rearward flight, 15kts in sideways flight, a bank angle of 60°, and a load factor of 0.5 to 2g.

The Bell D-292's fuselage was produced in two halves, minimizing the amount of major assemblies. Bell used graphite tooling during autoclave curling to minimize the differential thermal expansion. Filament winding was used on the truss tailcone.

The Bell D-292 used the Avco Lycoming engines, transmission, two-bladed main and tail rotors, tailboom, vertical fin, and rotor pylon from the Bell 222. The new airframe replaced metal with composites for greater strength, reduced weight and both lower manufacturing and maintenance costs.

The D-292 serial number 85-24371 flew for the first time on 30 August 1985 following delays due to funding and industrial problems.

== Specifications ==
General characteristics

- Crew: four
- Length: 40 ft 5 in (12.32 m)
- Height: 11 ft 2 in (3.40 m)
- Empty weight: 5,765 lb (2,615 kg)
- Max takeoff weight: 7,485 lb (3,395 kg)
- Powerplant: 2 × Avco Lycoming LTS 101-750C-1 turboshaft, 684 hp (510 kW) each
- Main rotor diameter: 42 ft 0 in (12.80 m)

== See also ==
Related development

- Bell 222

Aircraft of comparable role, configuration, and era

- Boeing Model 360
- Sikorsky S-75

Related lists

- List of helicopters
