= Bell FCX-001 =

Proposed helicopter

FCX-001
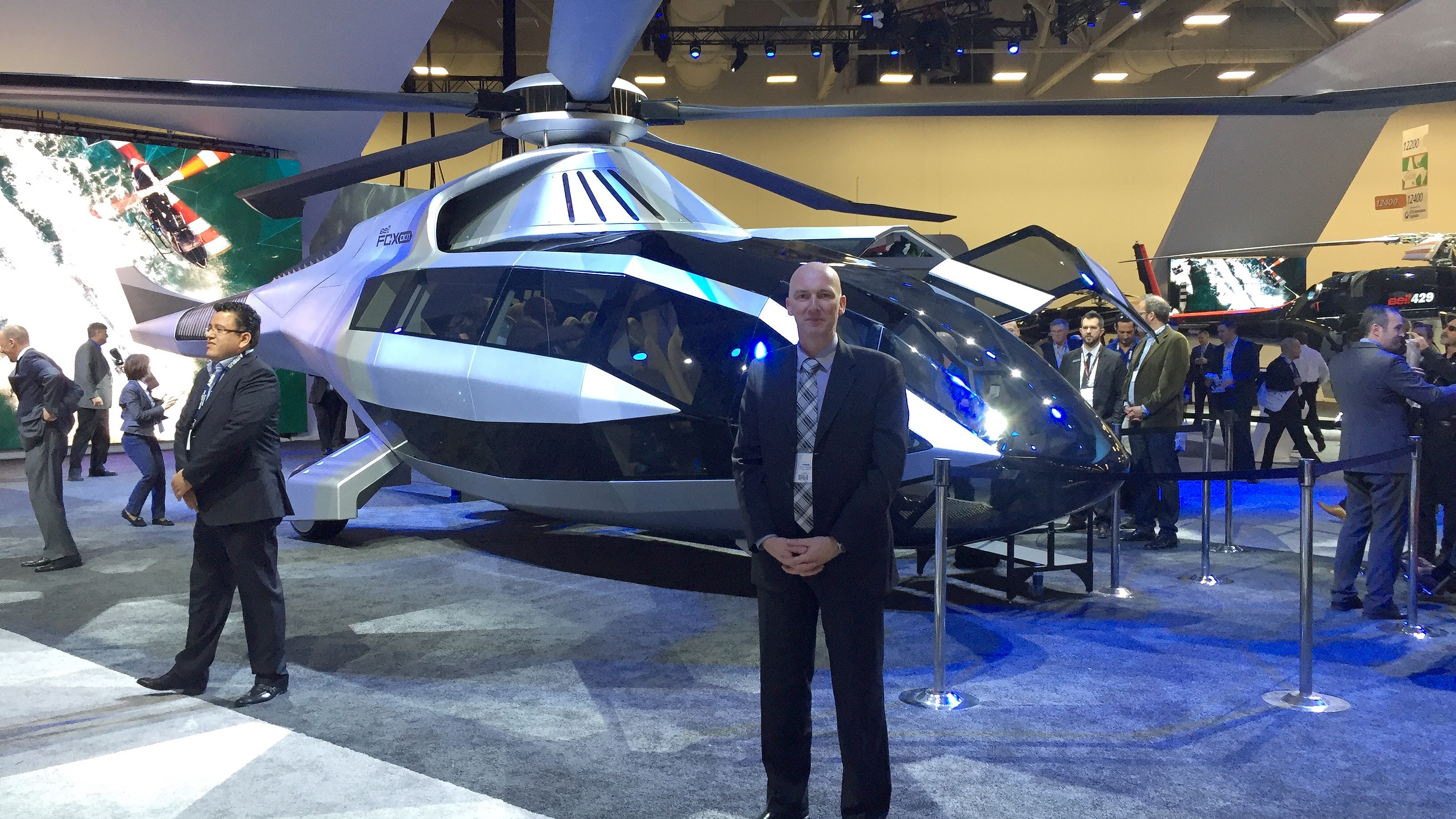
- Mock-up at Heli-Expo 2017

General information
- Type: Research helicopter
- National origin: United States
- Manufacturer: Bell Helicopter
- Status: Concept

The Bell FCX-001 is an American conceptual helicopter design proposed by Bell Helicopter. It was first presented to the public at Heli-Expo 2017 in Dallas on March 7, 2017.

== Design and development ==
On March 7, 2017, Bell Helicopter presented a conceptual, futuristic looking aircraft. The mock-up presented is configured for eight passengers, but will be capable of accommodating up to 12. On top of the aircraft are five "morphing" main rotor blades which aim to allow the tip of each blade to move between different flight regimes. This feature is supposed to maximize efficiency and performance and reduce noise. The airframe is slightly bigger than that of a Bell 412.
