= Light Helicopter Experimental =

1980s US Army procurement project

Light Helicopter Experimental (LHX)
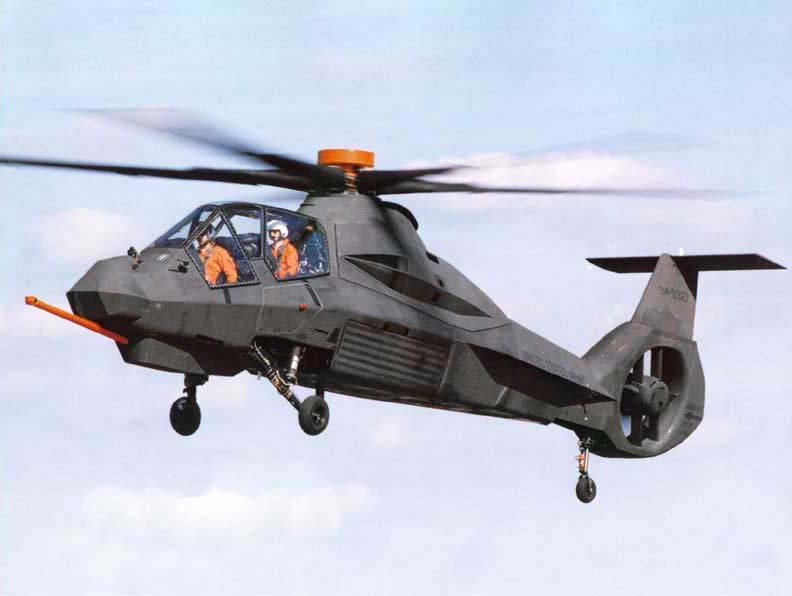
- RAH-66 Comanche

General information
- Project for: Utility and Scout/Attack Helicopter
- Issued by: United States Army
- Proposals: Boeing-Sikorsky and Bell-McDonnell Douglas

History
- Outcome: Boeing-Sikorsky RAH-66 Comanche, subsequently cancelled
- Related: Advanced Composite Airframe Program (ACAP)

The Light Helicopter Experimental (LHX) program was a 1980s United States Army helicopter procurement project to replace the AH-1 Cobra and OH-58 Kiowa helicopters. The result of this program lead to the development of the RAH-66 Comanche, which was cancelled before entering production.

== Background ==
In support of the LHX program, the United States Army started the Advanced Composite Airframe Program (ACAP) to develop an all-composite helicopter fuselage. In February 1981, contracts were awarded to Sikorsky (for the Sikorsky S-75) and Bell Helicopter (for the Bell D-292).

== LHX program ==
An Army Aviation Mission Area Analysis, completed in 1982, identified deficiencies in current materiel and doctrine that needed to be addressed to meet the requirements of the new Airland Battle Doctrine. The specific material deficiencies were to be resolved through the LHX program.

In 1982, the U.S. Army started the Light Helicopter Experimental (LHX) program to replace the UH-1, AH-1, OH-6, and OH-58 helicopters. In August 1986, the Defense Science Board review revealed that the Army suffered from stovepiping in a program development sense, and could not think outside the box. The Army solidified requirements too early without sufficient risk management. A single-crew version was an early requirement, but depended upon successful development of a risky electronic package.

Early concepts included both utility and scout/attack versions, but by 1988, the utility concept was dropped. A Request for proposals for the new helicopter type was released in June 1988. In October 1988, the Boeing-Sikorsky and Bell-McDonnell Douglas teams received contracts for their designs. The Bell-McDonnell Douglas design featured ordnance carriage within a combined wing/sponson and instead of a tail rotor used a NOTAR ducted exhaust system. The Boeing-Sikorsky design carried ordnance within upward swinging gull-wing doors in the sides of the fuselage and featured a fenestron tail rotor. The program's name was changed to Light Helicopter (LH) in 1990. In April 1991, the Boeing-Sikorsky team was selected as the contest winner and received a contract to build four prototypes. Also that month, the helicopter was designated "RAH-66 Comanche" by the Army.

In March 2004, the Army Chief of Staff terminated the Comanche program. The termination happened for several reasons; among them were unrealistic and unachievable overarching requirements, the rising projected cost of production, changing aviation mission of the Army (refusal to consider the changing threat environment), lack of sufficient funding for other critical aviation needs, the lack of achieving reduced risk of certain key technologies, and chronic groupthink.

== See also ==
- Bell D-292
- Sikorsky S-75
- LHX Attack Chopper
