= Bell Textron =

Aerospace manufacturer in the United States

Bell Textron Inc.
- Logo as of 2018
- Formerly: Bell Helicopter Company; Bell Helicopter Textron; Bell Helicopter
- Type: Subsidiary
- Industry: Aerospace; Defense
- Predecessor: Bell Aircraft
- Founded: 1960; 66 years ago (Bell Helicopter); 1935; 91 years ago (Bell Aircraft)
- Headquarters: Fort Worth, Texas, US
- Key people: Danny Maldonado (president & CEO)
- Parent: Textron
- Website: www.bellflight.com

Bell Textron Inc. is an American aerospace manufacturer headquartered in Fort Worth, Texas. A subsidiary of Textron, Bell manufactures military rotorcraft at facilities in Fort Worth, and Amarillo, Texas, United States and commercial helicopters in Mirabel, Quebec, Canada.

== History ==
=== Bell Aircraft ===
The company was founded on July 10, 1935, as Bell Aircraft Corporation by Lawrence Dale Bell in Buffalo, New York. The company focused on the designing and building of fighter aircraft. Their first fighters were the XFM-1 Airacuda, a twin-engine fighter for attacking bombers, and the P-39 Airacobra. The P-59 Airacomet, the first American jet fighter, the P-63 Kingcobra, the successor to the P-39, and the Bell X-1 were also Bell products.

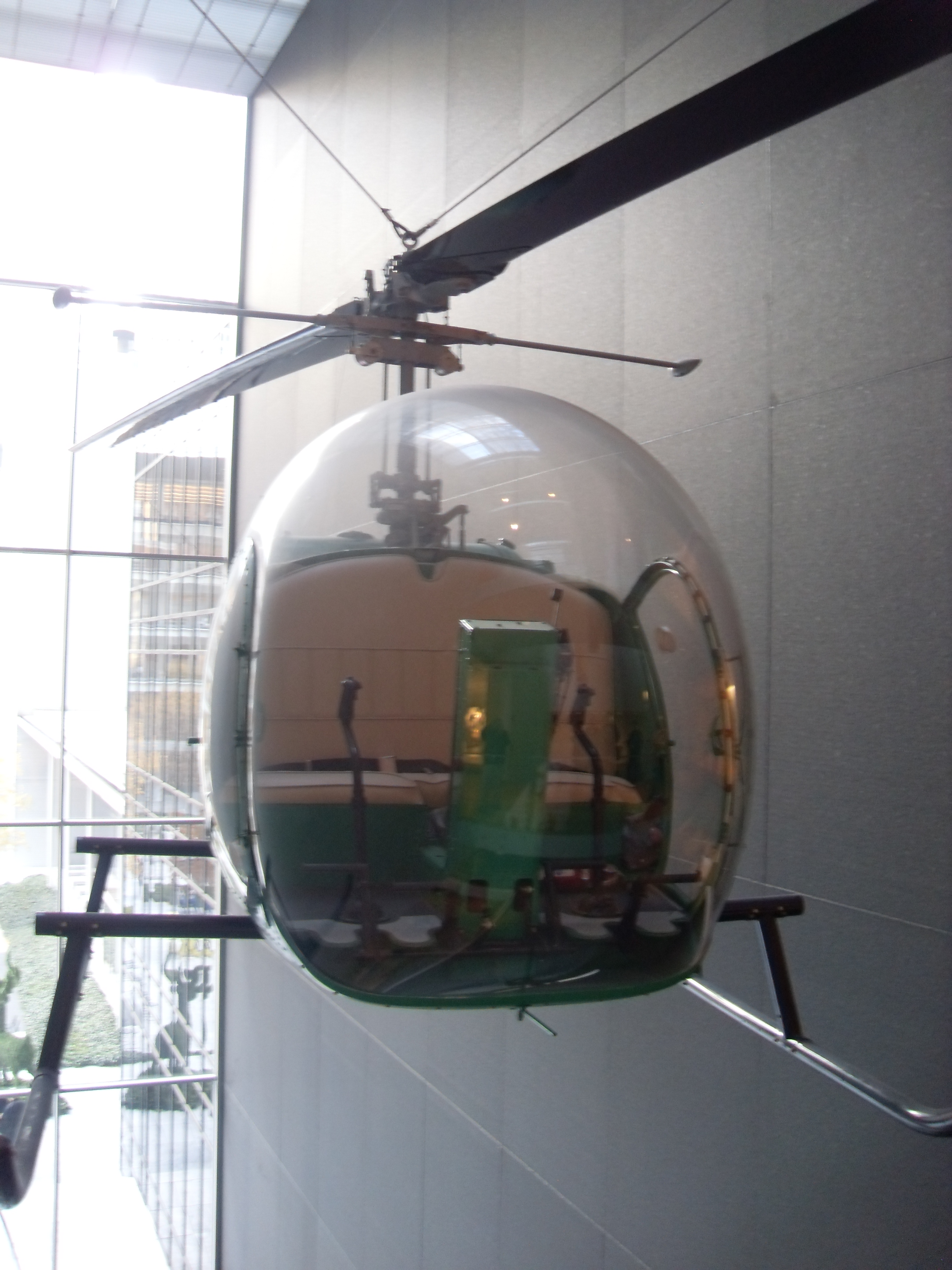
A Bell 47 is displayed at the MoMA

Previous Bell logo

In 1941, Bell hired Arthur M. Young, a talented inventor, to provide expertise for helicopter research and development. It was the foundation for what Bell hoped would be a broader economic base for his company that was not dependent on government contracts. The Bell 30 was their first full-size helicopter (first flight December 29, 1942) and the Bell 47 became the first helicopter in the world rated by a civil aviation authority, becoming a civilian and military success. Due to its burgeoning success, the helicopter division relocated as a separate unit to Hurst, Texas in 1951.

=== Bell Helicopter ===
Textron purchased Bell Aerospace in 1960. Bell Aerospace was composed of three divisions of Bell Aircraft Corporation, including its helicopter division, which had become its only division still producing complete aircraft. The helicopter division was renamed Bell Helicopter Company and in a few years, with the success of the UH-1 Huey during the Vietnam War, it had established itself as the largest division of Textron. In January 1976, Textron changed the division's name to Bell Helicopter Textron.

Bell Helicopter had a close association with AgustaWestland. The partnership dated back to separate manufacturing and technology agreements with Agusta (Bell 47 and Bell 206) and as a sublicence via Agusta with Westland (Bell 47). When the two European firms merged, the partnerships were retained, with the exception of the AB139, which is now known as the AW139. Bell and AW cooperated also on the AW609 tiltrotor.

Bell planned to reduce employment by 760 in 2014 as fewer V-22s were made. A rapid prototyping center called XworX assists Bell's other divisions in reducing development time.

The company was rebranded as "Bell" on February 22, 2018.

== Product list ==
Established in 1986, its Mirabel, Quebec facility assembles and delivers most of Bell's commercial helicopters and delivered its 5,000th helicopter on December 12, 2017.

=== Commercial helicopters ===
Model	Intro.	Until	MTOW (lb/t)		Notes
Bell 47	1946	1974	2,950	1.34	based on the Bell 30 prototype, piston engine
Bell 47J Ranger	1956	1967	2,950	1.34	Bell 47 executive variant
Bell 204/205	1959	1980s	9,500	4.31	Huey family civil variant, single turboshaft
Bell 206	1967	2017	3,200	1.45	light single or twin turboshaft
Bell 210	?	?	11,200	5.08	Upgraded Bell 205 (205B)
Bell 212	1968	1998	11,200	5.08	Civilian (Military version: UH-1N Twin Huey)
Bell 214	1972	1981	15,000	6.8	larger Huey
Bell 214ST	1982	1993	17,500	7.94	medium twin derived from the 214
Bell 222/230	1979	1995	8,400	3.81	light twin
Bell 407	1995	current	6,000	2.72	four-blade single derived from the 206L-4
Bell 412	1981	current	11,900	5.4	four-blade 212
Bell 427	2000	2010	6,550	2.97	407 derived light twin
Bell 429 GlobalRanger	2009	current	7,000/7,500	3.2	new light twin
Bell 430	1995	2008	9,300	4.22	230 stretch with 4 bladed rotor
Bell 525 Relentless	2018	current	20,500	9.3	in development
Bell 505 Jet Ranger X	2017	current	3,680	1.67	206L4 drive and rotors
Bell Nexus	2020	current			pre-production hybrid-electric propulsion system with six tilting ducted fans

=== Gallery ===
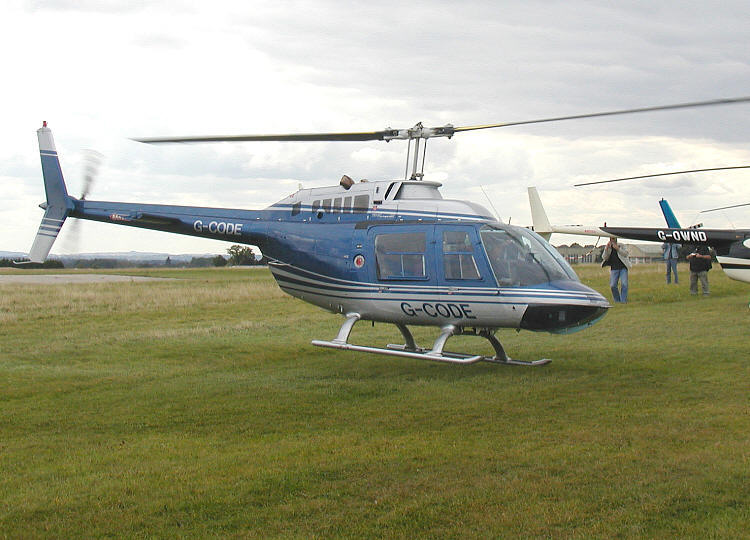
Bell 206B JetRanger III

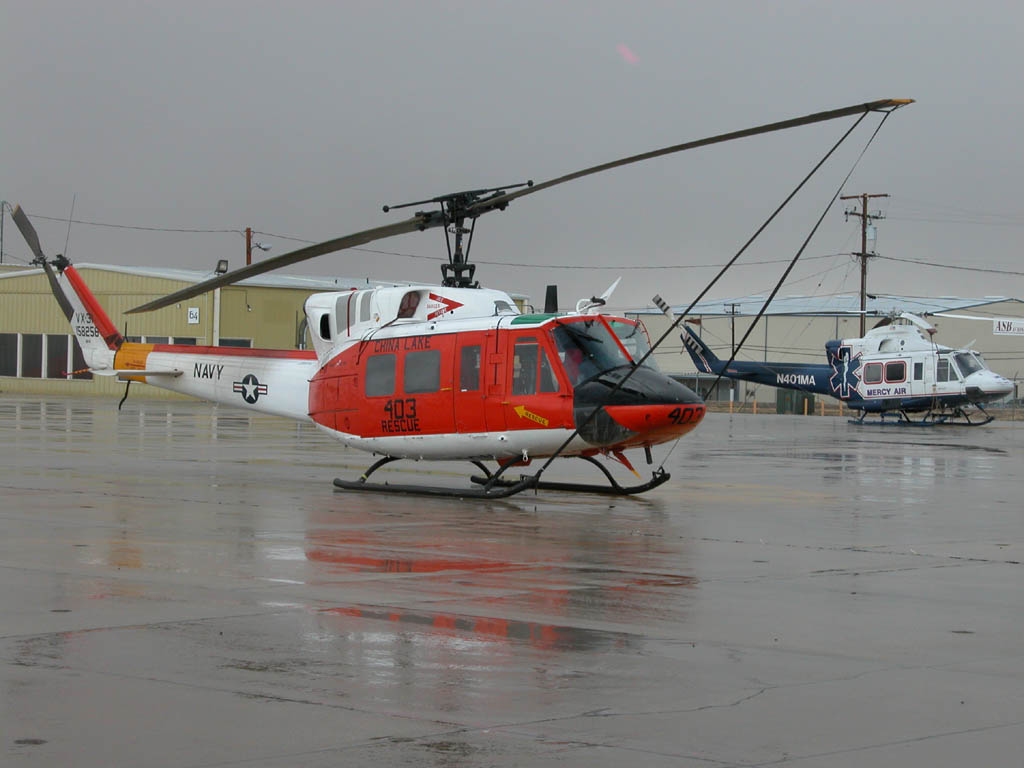
Comparison of the Bell 212 (U.S. Navy HH-1N) and 412 (Mercy Air) at the Mojave Airport

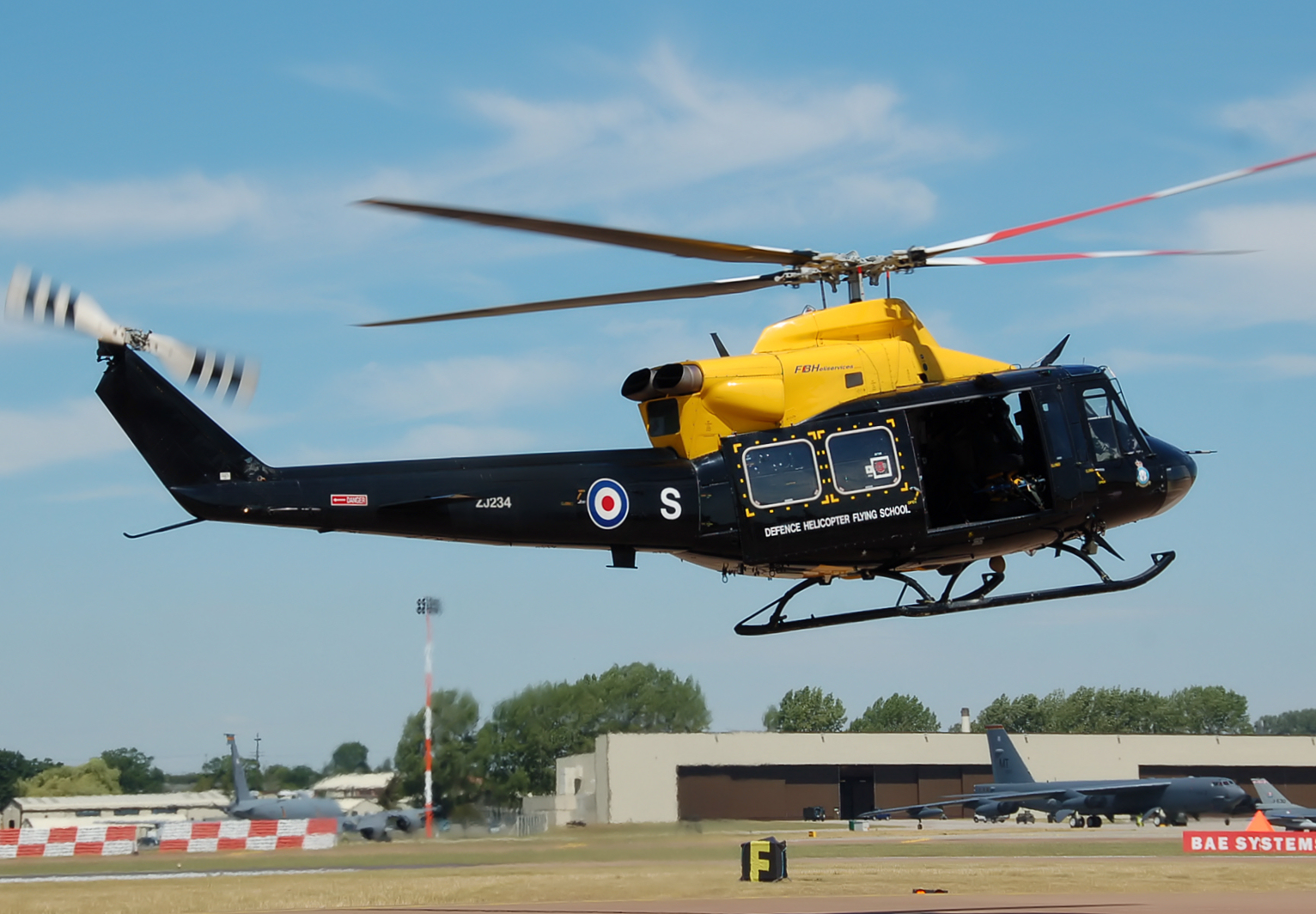
Bell 412EP Griffin HT1 helicopter of the UK Defence Helicopter Flying School

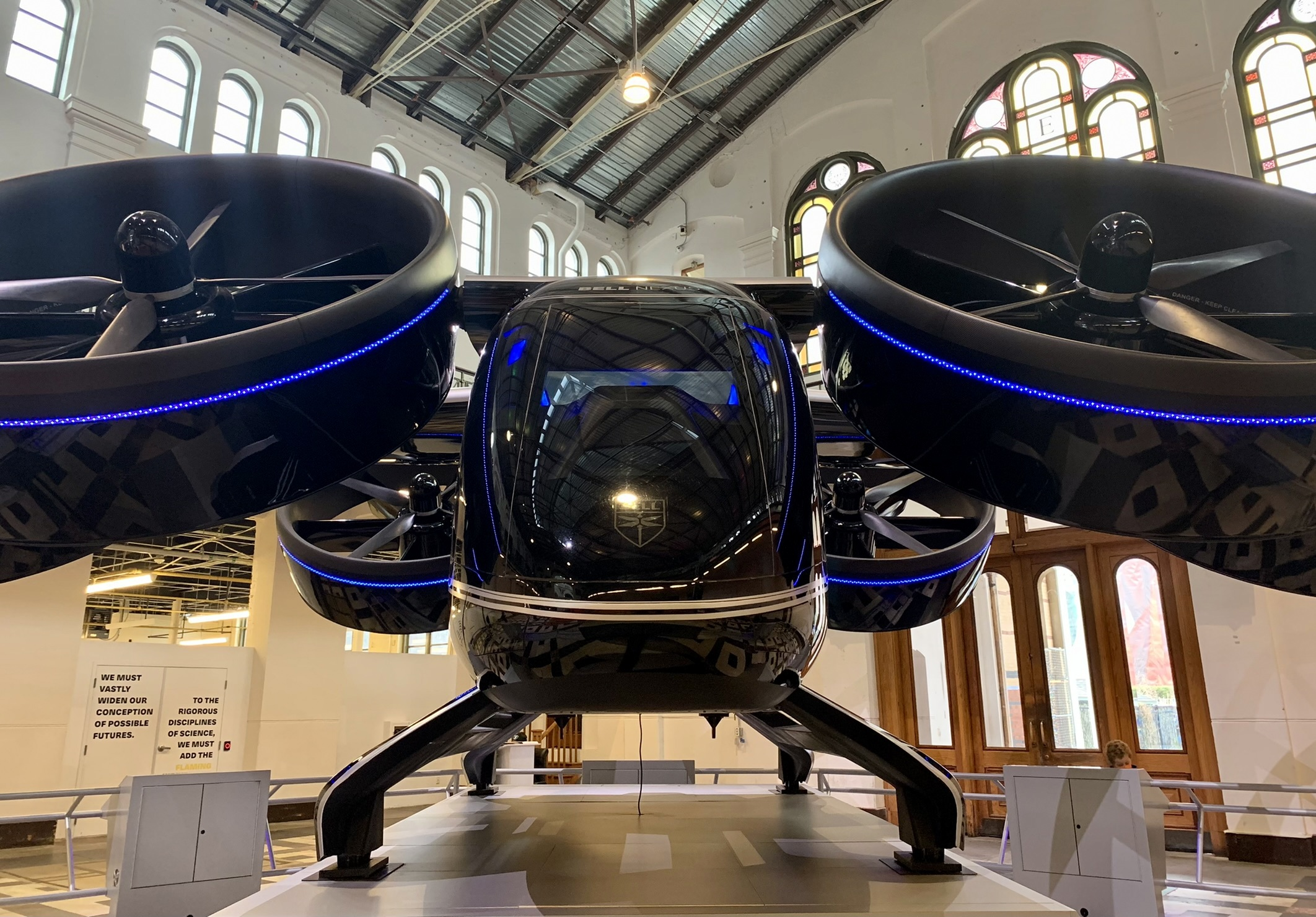
Bell Nexus ‘Air Taxi’ at Smithsonian in 2022

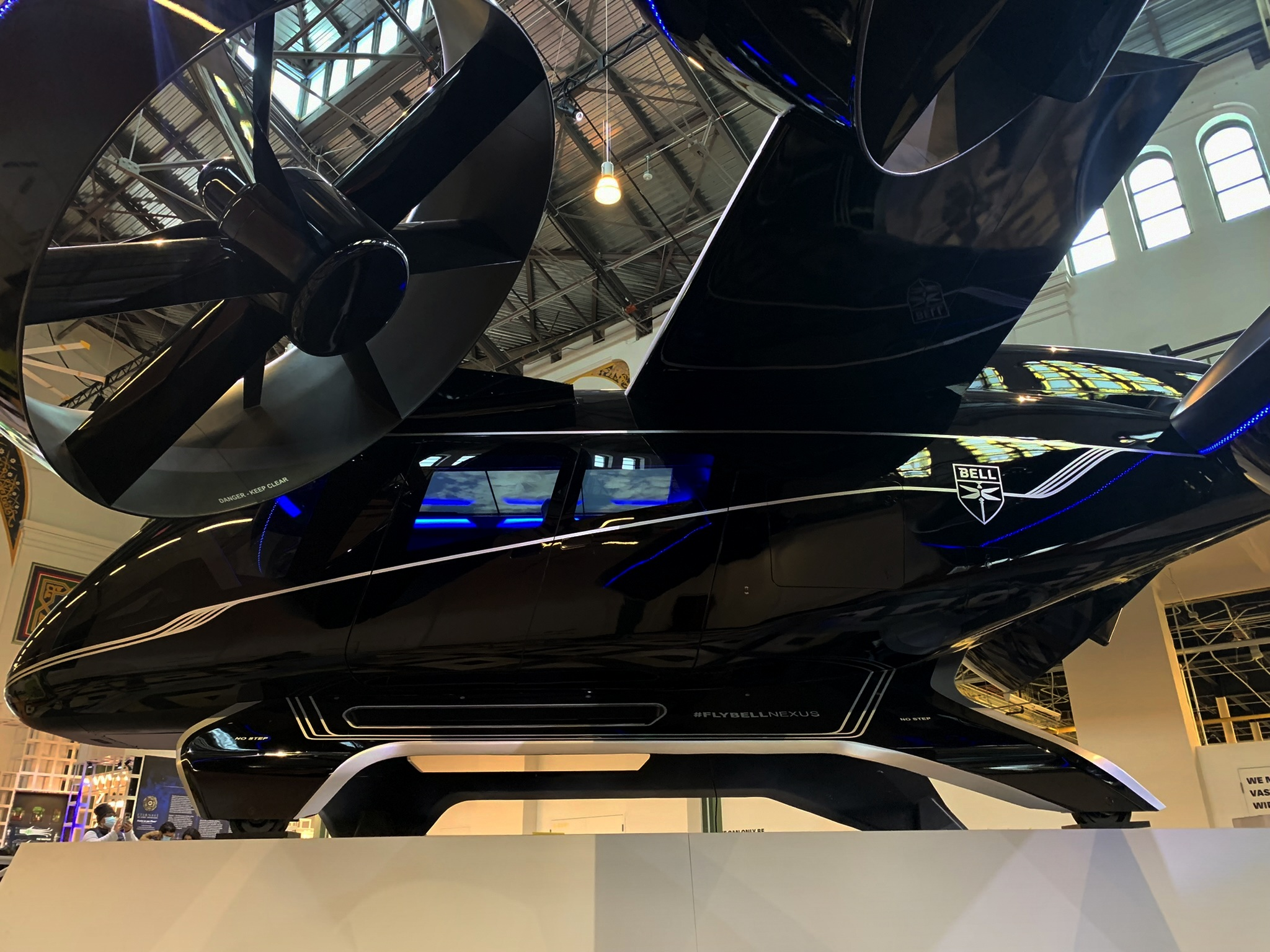
Bell Nexus ‘Air Taxi’ at Smithsonian in 2022

=== Military helicopters ===
- Bell H-12
- Bell H-13 Sioux
  - Bell XH-13F
- Bell XH-15
- Bell HSL
- Bell UH-1 Iroquois (or Huey)
  - Bell Huey family
  - Bell UH-1 Iroquois variants
- Bell UH-1N Twin Huey
- Bell YHO-4
- Bell 207 Sioux Scout – experimental attack helicopter
- Bell 533 – experimental Huey variant with increased performance
- Bell AH-1 Cobra
- Bell AH-1 SeaCobra/SuperCobra
- Bell 309 KingCobra - experimental attack helicopter
- YAH-63/Model 409 – competitor with the YAH-64 for Advanced Attack Helicopter program
- Bell OH-58 Kiowa
- H-1 upgrade program
  - Bell UH-1Y Venom
  - Bell AH-1Z Viper
- Bell CH-146 Griffon
- Bell ARH-70 Arapaho - cancelled armed reconnaissance helicopter
- Bell 360 Invictus - cancelled armed reconnaissance helicopter
- Bell X-76 - Speed and Runway Independent Technologies (SPRINT)

=== Tiltrotors ===
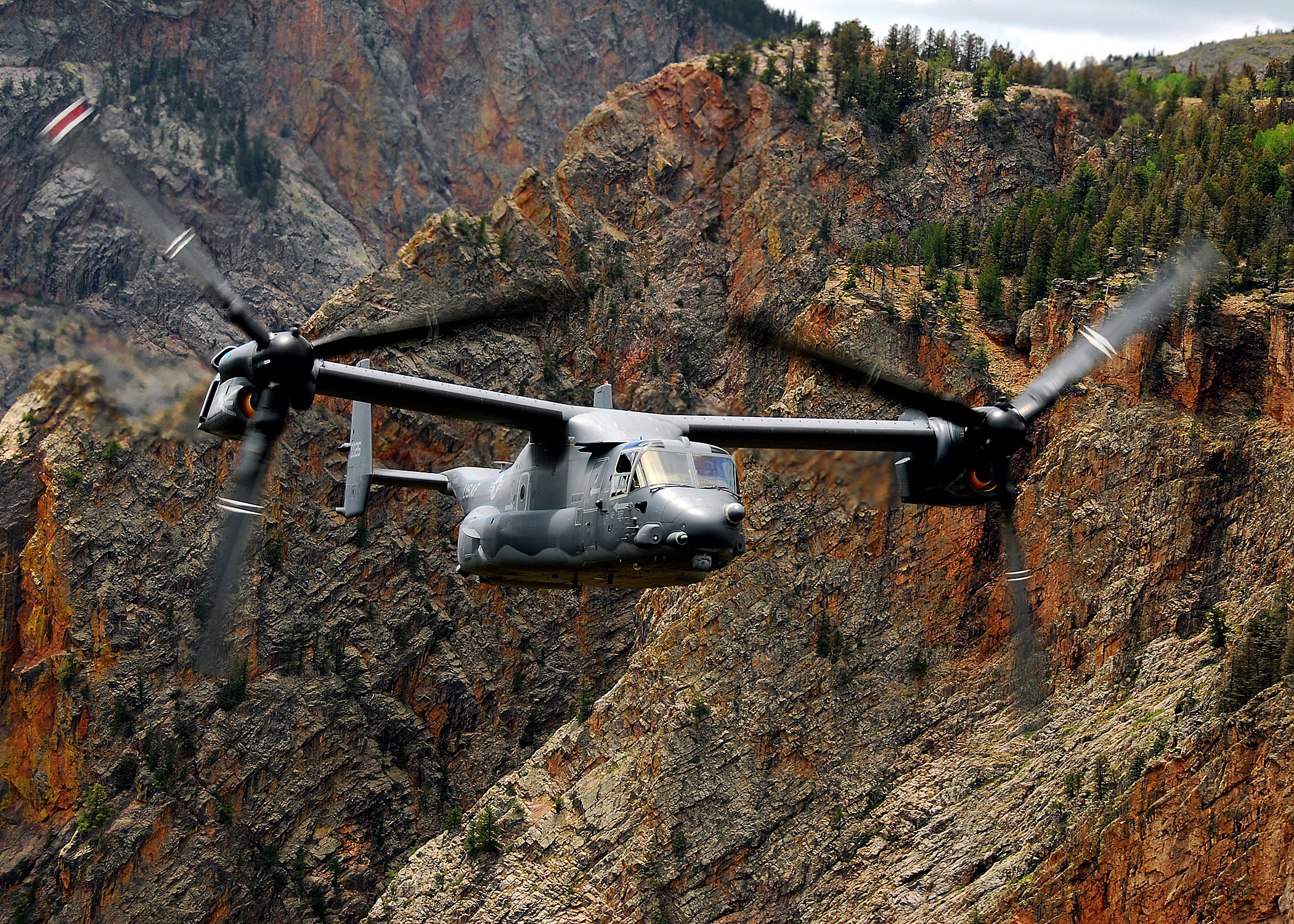
V-22 in flight

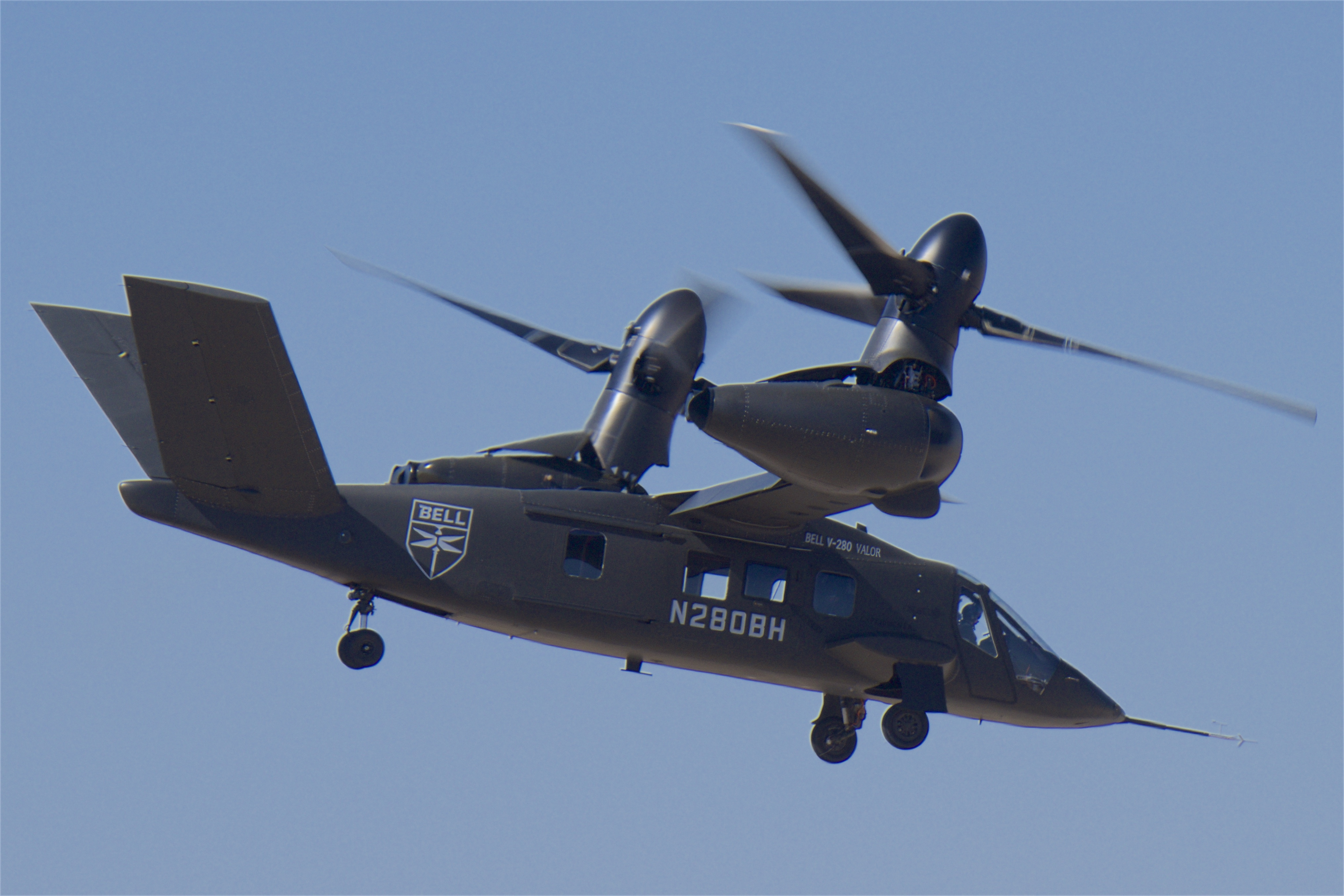
V-280 in flight

- Bell XV-3
- Bell XV-15
- Bell Pointer
- Bell V-247 Vigilant – currently in development
- Bell V-280 Valor – currently in development, first flown 2017
- V-22 Osprey – with Boeing BDS
- TR918 Eagle Eye UAV
- Quad TiltRotor – with Boeing BDS
- Bell BAT (1984 tiltrotor project for LHX programme – not built)
- Bell CTR-1900 (Tilt-rotor project only – not built)
- Bell CTR-22 (Tilt-rotor project only – not built)
- Bell CTR-750 (Tilt-rotor project only – not built)
- Bell CTR-800 (Tilt-rotor project only – not built)
- Bell D-326 (Clipper 1980 commercial tilt-rotor project – not built)

=== Projects produced by other companies ===
- AgustaWestland AW139 helicopter (formerly 50-50 as the Agusta-Bell AB139, now 100% AgustaWestland)
- AgustaWestland AW609 tiltrotor (formerly 50-50 as the Bell-Agusta BA609, now 100% AgustaWestland)
- Lockheed Martin VH-71 Kestrel

==== Unproduced designs ====
- Bell 280 (project only, twin-engined wide-body variant of the Cobra)
- Bell D-218
- Bell D-230 (Flying Jeep project – not built)
- Bell D-245
- Bell D-246
- Bell 400 TwinRanger (1984), cancelled 206-derived light twin
- Bell D-292 (1985), Light Helicopter Experimental (LHX) prototype
- Bell 417 (2006) cancelled Bell 407 growth variant
- Bell FCX-001, March 2017 concept

== Facilities ==
Bell manufacturing and support facilities are:

Military

- Fort Worth, Texas – located at six manufacturing facilities throughout the DFW area; of these six the Manufacturing Technology Center (MTC) in Fort Worth, Texas serves as the primary manufacturing development facility of the Bell V-280 Valor, Bell 360 Invictus
- Amarillo, Texas: located near Rick Husband Amarillo International Airport; assembly plant for H1, V-22 and 525

Commercial

- Mirabel, Quebec, Canada: opened in 1983 and located next to Montreal-Mirabel International Airport; it produces components for Bell 407, 412, 429, 505 and 525; assembly plant and finally assembly for current commercial products (407, 412, 429, 505).

== See also ==
- Leonardo Helicopters
- Airbus Helicopters
- Sikorsky Aircraft
