= PAC =

Pac or PAC may refer to:

== Arts and media ==
- Padiglione d'Arte Contemporanea, a museum in Milan, Italy
- Pan Asian Coalition, a faction in the computer game Battlefield 2142
- Perfect authentic cadence, in music
- Performing arts center
- Providence Anime Conference, 2008
- Pure and Applied Chemistry, an academic journal

== Businesses ==
- Pacific Aerospace Corporation, New Zealand, manufacturer of aircraft
  - For aircraft models, see § Other uses in science and technology
- Panasonic Avionics Corporation, produces equipment and services for in-flight entertainment, etc.
- Pakistan Aeronautical Complex, aerospace manufacturer
- Peruvian Amazon Company, a former rubber company
- Planned Amortization Class, a type of collateralized mortgage obligation
- Polar Air Cargo airline, Purchase, New York, US
- Albrook "Marcos A. Gelabert" International Airport in Panama City, Panama (IATA code PAC)

== Education ==
- Panasonic Academic Challenge, a US national competition
- Prince Alfred College, Australia
- Peres Academic Center, a private college in Israel

== Military ==
- Civil Defense Patrols (Patrullas de Autodefensa Civil), Guatemalan militia and paramilitary group
- Patriot Advanced Capability, of the MIM-104 Patriot missile
- Rapid Deployment Force (Malaysia), an armed forces unit

== People ==
- Pac (wrestler) (1986–2026), English professional wrestler
- Pac (family), of the Grand Duchy of Lithuania
- Tupac Shakur or Pac, 2Pac (1971–1996), American rapper

== Politics and government ==
- Anti-Corruption Party (Partido Anti-Corrupción), Honduras
- Armed Proletarians for Communism (Proletari Armati per il Comunismo), a former Italian group
- Pan Africanist Congress, South Africa
- Partido Acción Ciudadana (disambiguation), several political parties in Latin America
- Peoples' Aman Committee, a criminal gang and welfare group associated with the Pakistan Peoples Party
- Political action committee, U.S. political fundraiser
- Political Affairs Committee (British Guiana)
- Polish American Congress
- Public Accounts Committee:
  - Public Accounts Committee (India)
  - Public Accounts Committee (Ireland)
  - Public Accounts Committee (Malaysia)
  - Public Accounts Committee (United Kingdom)
- Public Affairs Committee (Malawi)
- Public assistance committee, a body in the UK for assisting the poor between 1930 and 1940

== Science and technology ==
=== Biology and medicine ===
- Pancreatic adenocarcinoma, a form of pancreatic cancer
- Physician assistant, certified, commonly abbreviated in the US as PA-C
- Plasma aldosterone concentration
- Post-abortion care
- Pre-anesthesia checkup
- Premature atrial contraction, a cardiac dysrhythmia
- Photoactivated adenylyl cyclase, a light-sensitive protein
- Proanthocyanidin, a type of flavanol
- Pulmonary artery catheterization

=== Computing ===
- Pacifica Coin; see List of TCP and UDP port numbers#Registered_ports
- Perceptual Audio Coder, a lossy audio compression algorithm
- Pin Array Cartridge, an integrated circuit packaging type
- Pointer Authentication Code, an ARM security feature
- Probably approximately correct, in machine learning
- Presentation–abstraction–control, in software architecture
- Programmable Automation Controller; see Computer appliance
- Proxy auto-config, a web browser technology

=== Physics and chemistry ===
- Perturbed angular correlation, a method of measuring fields in crystal structures
- Polyaluminium chloride, less effective than aluminium chlorohydrate for water treatment
- Powdered activated carbon, used in electrochemical regeneration
- Pure and Applied Chemistry, the official monthly journal of IUPAC

=== Other uses in science and technology ===
- Several aircraft produced by Pacific Aerospace Corporation:
  - PAC 750XL
  - PAC Cresco
  - PAC CT/4
  - PAC Fletcher
- Parent-Adult-Child, a model in transactional analysis
- Porting Authorisation Code, to transfer mobile phone numbers
- Pseudo algebraically closed field, in mathematics

== Sports ==
- Pennsylvania Athletic Conference, former name of the Colonial States Athletic Conference, an NCAA Division III collegiate athletic conference in Pennsylvania, US
- Pioneer Athletic Conference, a high school athletic conference in Pennsylvania, US
- Pocket Athletic Conference, a high school athletic conference in Indiana, US
- Presidents' Athletic Conference, an NCAA Division III collegiate athletic conference in the Appalachian region of the US

== Other uses ==
- Pac, Albania, a village in Bytyç, Albania
- Programa de Aceleração do Crescimento, an investment plan in Brazil
- Albrook "Marcos A. Gelabert" International Airport in Panama City, Panama (IATA code PAC)

== See also ==
- Pac-12 Conference (Pac-12), a US college athletic conference
- Pac-Man (disambiguation)
- Public Affairs Council (disambiguation)
