= Butler Memorial Airport =

Airport in Butler, Missouri, United States

- IATA: BUM; ICAO: KBUM; FAA LID: BUM

Summary
- Airport type: Public
- Serves: Butler, Missouri, US
- Elevation AMSL: 892 ft (272 m)
- Coordinates: 38.289°N 94.342°W
- Interactive map of Butler Memorial Airport

Runways
Direction	Length		Surface
Direction	ft	m	Surface
18/36	4,000	1,219	Asphalt
- Sources: FAA

Butler Memorial Airport (IATA: BUM, ICAO: KBUM, FAA LID: BUM) is a city-owned, public-use airport located two nautical miles (3.7 km) north of the central business district of Butler, the county seat of Bates County, Missouri, United States. It is included in the National Plan of Integrated Airport Systems for 2011–2015, which categorized it as a general aviation facility.

== Accidents ==
- On June 14, 2026: 2026 Butler PAC P-750 crash, a PAC P-750 XSTOL skydiving aircraft crashed following takeoff from Butler Memorial Airport. The aircraft was a private plane operated by Skydive Kansas City. The plane crashed near a highway. The accident follows the September 1995 crash of a Beechcraft Queen Air near West Point, Virginia, as one of the second deadliest skydiving plane crash in United States history.

== See also ==
- List of airports in Missouri
