= EcoJet concept car =

Jet turbine-powered concept car

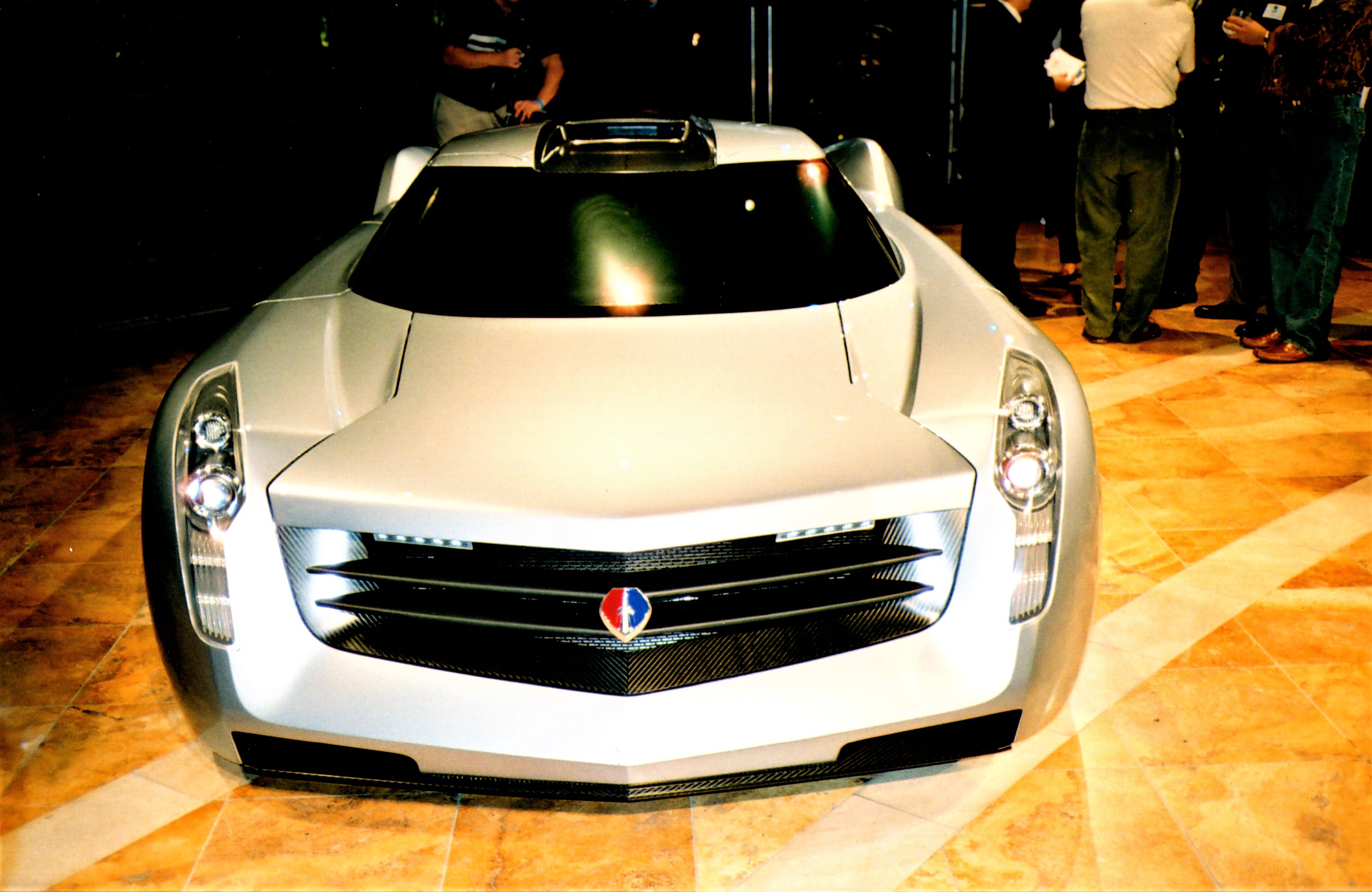
EcoJet front view

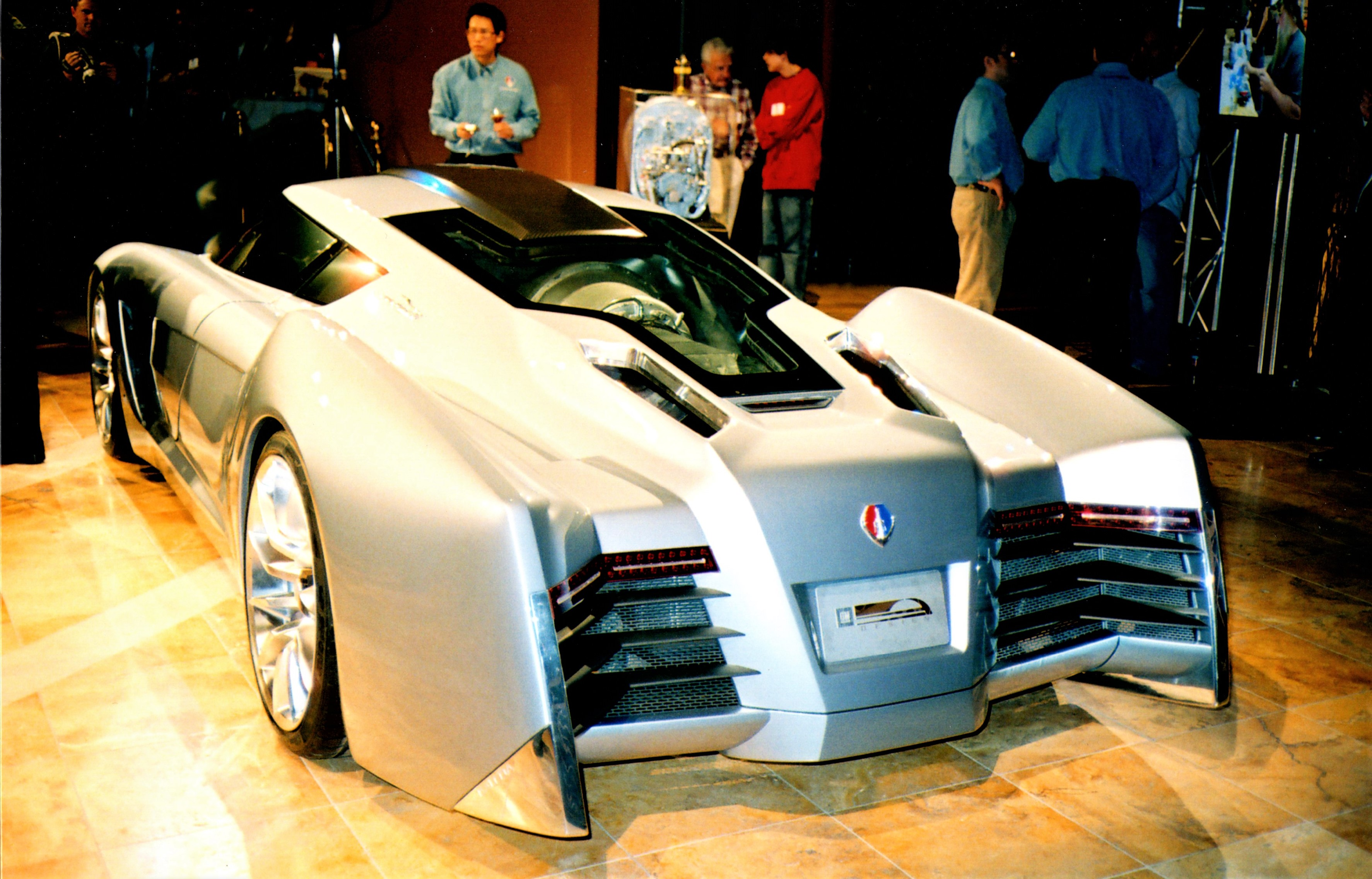
EcoJet rear view

The EcoJet is a concept car designed to run on biodiesel fuel, using a Honeywell LTS101 based gas turbine instead of a reciprocating engine. The engine is normally used in helicopters and provides 650 horsepower and 583 ft-lb of torque. Drive is to the rear wheels through a four-speed automatic transaxle adapted from a C5 Corvette. An automatic transmission had to be used, because the turbine requires a constant load and operating a clutch with a manual gearbox would cause the turbine to overspeed.

This concept car was the result of a collaboration between Jay Leno and General Motors, Honeywell, Alcoa and BASF. Unlike other concept cars, it was meant to be driven on the road in a regular fashion, as well as for show purposes.

It is a two-seater car of a coupé design with a hydroformed aluminum chassis and carbon-fiber-reinforced polymer bodywork. The car contains two separate fuel tanks; one contains the main biodiesel fuel, soybean oil, and the other contains a conventional clean-burning jet engine fuel, Jet A (kerosene). The kerosene is used to start the turbine easily at the beginning of a trip and also to run the engine at the end of a trip to clean it, since biodiesel fuel tends to gum up the fuel system if not cleared. The exhaust gas temperature is 1000 degrees Fahrenheit in normal operation and 1800 Fahrenheit at full power. Exhaust is directed upward from two ports on the rear deck. In essence, the car runs on refined cooking oil, thus producing the same kind of smell created by cooking French fries.

The car has an Azentek in-dash car computer running Microsoft Windows Vista, with two LCD screens on the dashboard — one for the aircraft-style digital gauges and another for the multimedia and navigation controls — as well as the standard PC functions, such as word processing and Web access through a WiMAX system. Two other smaller LCD screens are placed on the dashboard to provide rear views, as the car has no rear-view mirrors and uses cameras instead. The functions are controlled by Touchscreen or by Speech recognition software, using an array of microphones. The car was assembled by the Big Dog crew, mechanics employed by Jay Leno to help him maintain his large collection of cars.
