= Piaggio P.166 =

Twin-engine pusher-type utility aircraft

P.166
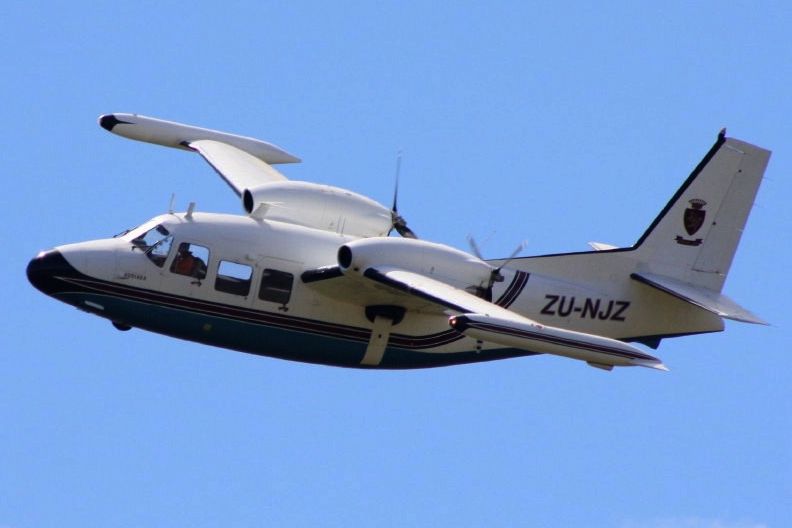

General information
- Type: Utility aircraft
- National origin: Italy
- Manufacturer: Piaggio Aero
- Number built: ~154

History
- First flight: 26 November 1957
- Developed from: Piaggio P.136

The Piaggio P.166 is an Italian twin-engine pusher-type utility aircraft developed by Piaggio Aero. The aircraft model name was Portofino, and is also known as Albatross in South African military service.

== Design and development ==
The basic P.166 was a development of the P.136 amphibian and flew for the first time on 26 November 1957. The P.166 had a new fuselage and tail unit but retained the wing and engines from the P.136. Several were purchased for use as executive transports or as feeder and taxi aircraft. The improved P.166B was more powerful and had up to ten seats; a prototype was first flown on 27 March 1962.

A further version, the 12-seater P.166C with improved undercarriage, first flew on 2 October 1964.

A turboprop-powered variant, the P.166D, was developed with Lycoming LTP101 engines and it first flew on 3 July 1976.

== Variants ==
P.166
Prototypes powered by 340 hp (254 kW) Lycoming GSO-480-B1C6 engines, three built.
P.166AL1
First production version with non-slanted cockpit side windows. Accommodation for two pilots and six–eight passengers. Powered by 340 hp (250 kW) Lycoming GSO-480-B1C6 engines, 29 built.
P.166B Portofino
Revised, more powerful version with longer nose. Powered by two 380 hp (283 kW) Lycoming IGSO-540-A1C engines. Five built.
P.166BL2/APH
Photo survey aircraft for Italian Air Force. Two built.

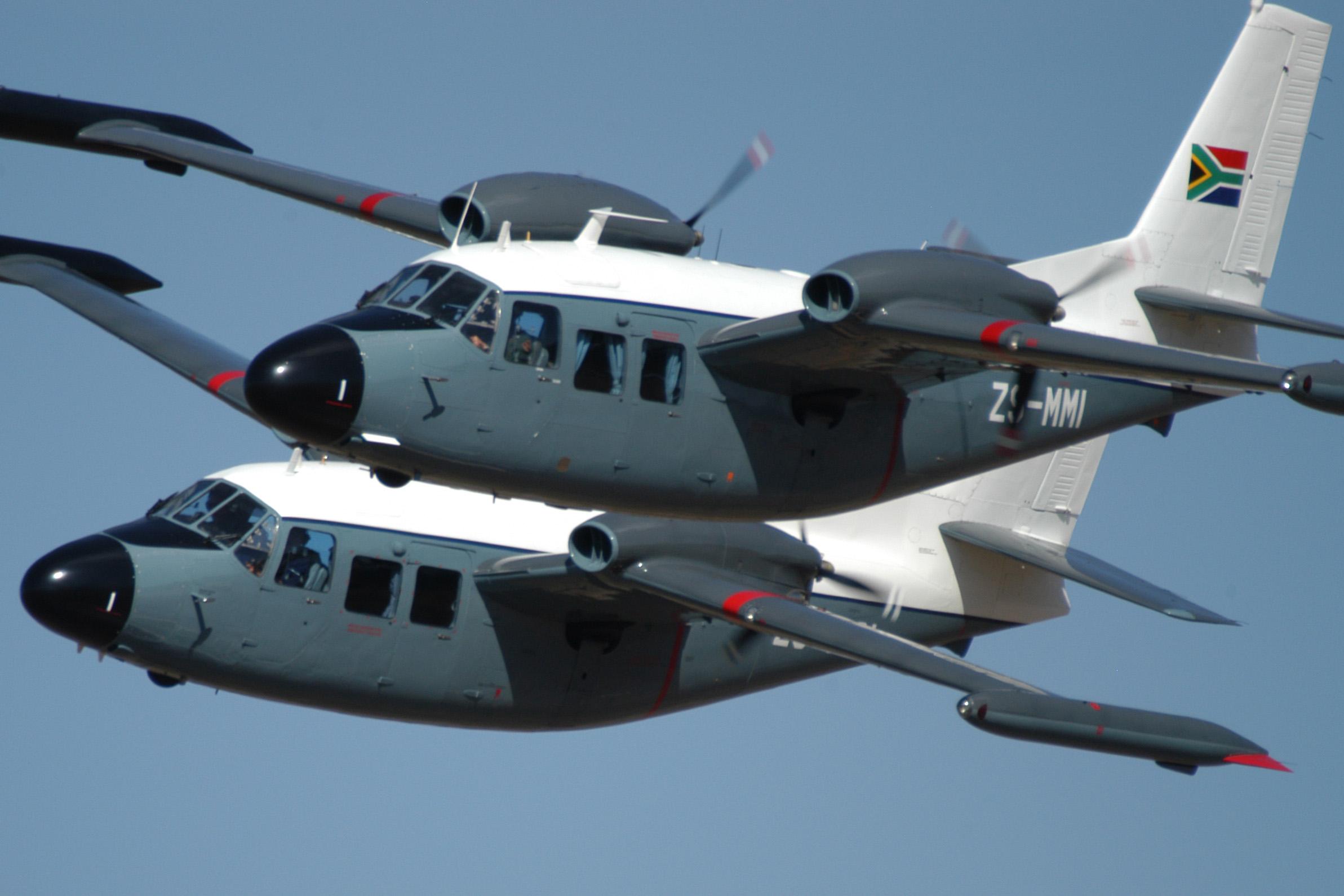
ZS-MMI, an ex-South African Air Force P.166S Albatross

P.166CL2
Feederliner version of P.166B with external landing gear pods to allow a revised cabin giving room for up to 12 passengers. Two built. or another source gives four built
P.166DL3
Light utility transport version, powered by two 450 kW (600 hp) Lycoming LTP101-600 turboprop engines. 14 built including sub-variants.
P.166DL3/APH
Photo survey aircraft version of -DL3. Six built for Italian Air Force.
P.166DL3/MAR
Maritime patrol version of DL3. Two built for Somalia.
P.166DL3/SEM
Paramilitary maritime patrol (SEM - Sorveglianza Ecologia e Marittima - Maritime and ecological surveillance) version of DL3. 12 aircraft built for Italian Coast Guard and ten for Guardia di Finanza.
P.166DP1
Re-engined version with 615 shp (459 kW) Pratt & Whitney PT6A-121 turboprops. Eight converted (two from -DL3 and six from -DL3/SEM) for Guardia di Finanza.
P.166M
Military version of P.166A, 49 built for Italian air force.
P.166S Albatross
Coastal patrol, search and rescue version of the South African Air Force with longer P.166B-type nose and larger tip tanks, 20 built.

== Operators ==
Australia

- Air Associated
- Air Research
- Ansett-ANA
- Ansett-MAL

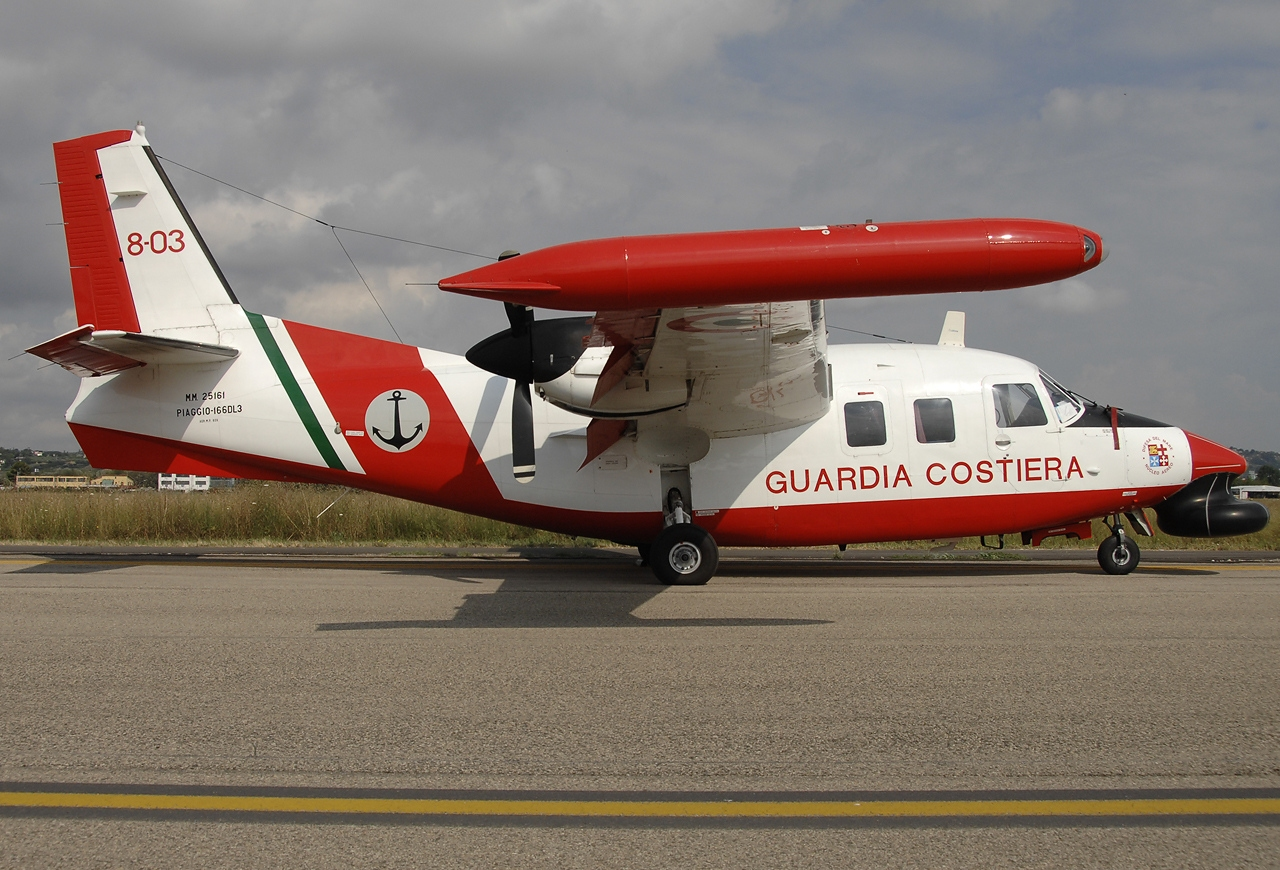
Italian Guardia Costiera

- Australian Federal Government
- Confederate Airways
- East Coast Airways
- Forrester Stephen Aviation
- GAAF Air Charter
- MacRobertson Miller Airlines
- Motif Air
- Papuan Air Transport
- Papuan Airlines
- Queensland Airlines
- South Pacific Airways - SPA
- Tasman Airlines

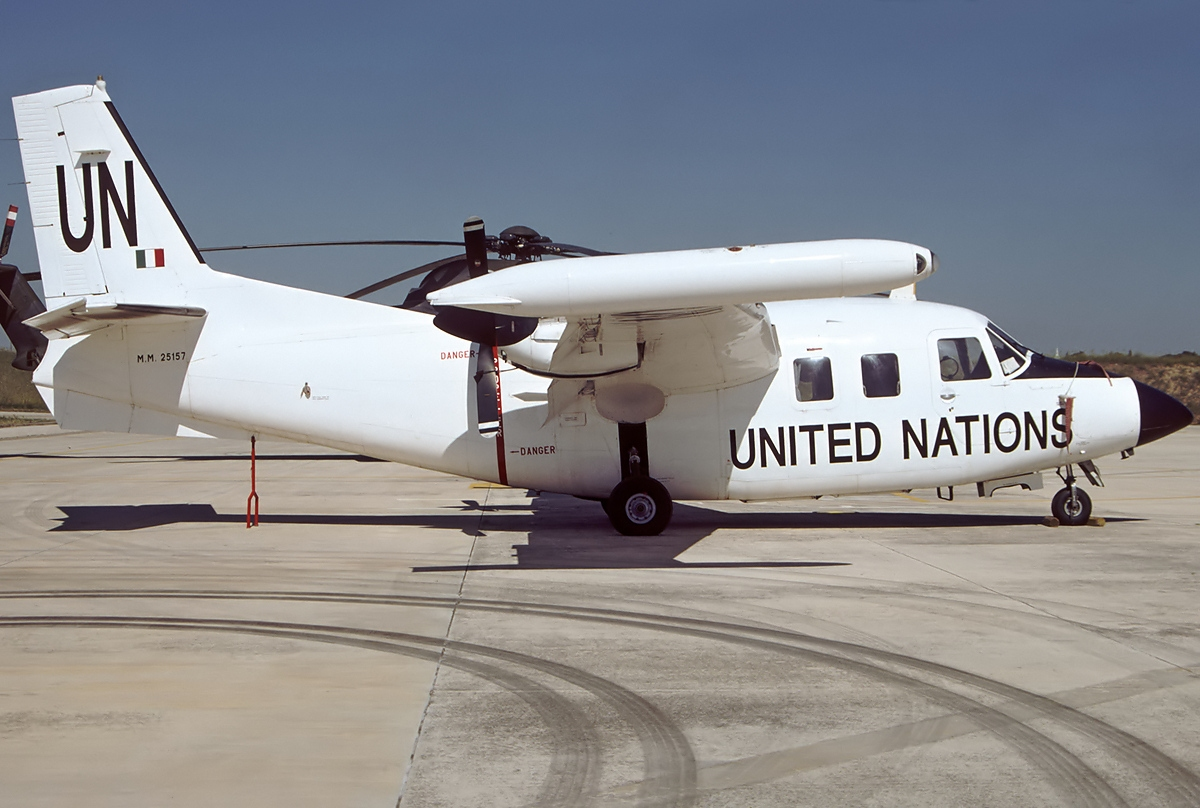
United Nations Humanitarian Air Service

Italy

- Alitalia
- Italian Air Force received 49 P.166M between 1960 and 1968, two P.166BL2/APH photo survey aircraft and six P.166-DL3/APH photo survey aircraft.
- Corps of the Port Captaincies - Coast Guard received 12 P.166-DL3/SEM between 1988 and 1990. Retired July 2017.
- Guardia di Finanza received two ex-Alitalia P.166-DL3 as trainers/utility aircraft in 1990 and ten new-built P.166-DL3/SEM between 1991 and 1995. Eight aircraft converted to P.166DP1 standard. Planned to remain in service until 2020.
- Italian Ministry of Merchant Marine

Somalia

- Somalian Aeronautical Corps purchased two P.166-DL3 utility aircraft and two P.166-DL3/MAR maritime patrol aircraft in 1980.

South Africa

- South African Air Force
  - 27 Squadron SAAF

== Notable accidents and incidents ==
- On September 1982, a Piaggio P.166 was struck by a Socata TB10 Tobago light aircraft stolen by 26-year-old student pilot Philip Henryk Wozniak, who committed suicide by intentionally crashing on Bankstown Airport, also destroying a parked Douglas DC-3 in the process.
- On 14 August 2011 two privately owned P.166s (formerly with the South African Air Force) flying in formation crashed near Tzaneen in South Africa when they both flew into a cliff face near the summit of Mamotswiri Peak in dense mist. All thirteen on board the two aircraft were killed.

== Specifications (P.166-DL3) ==
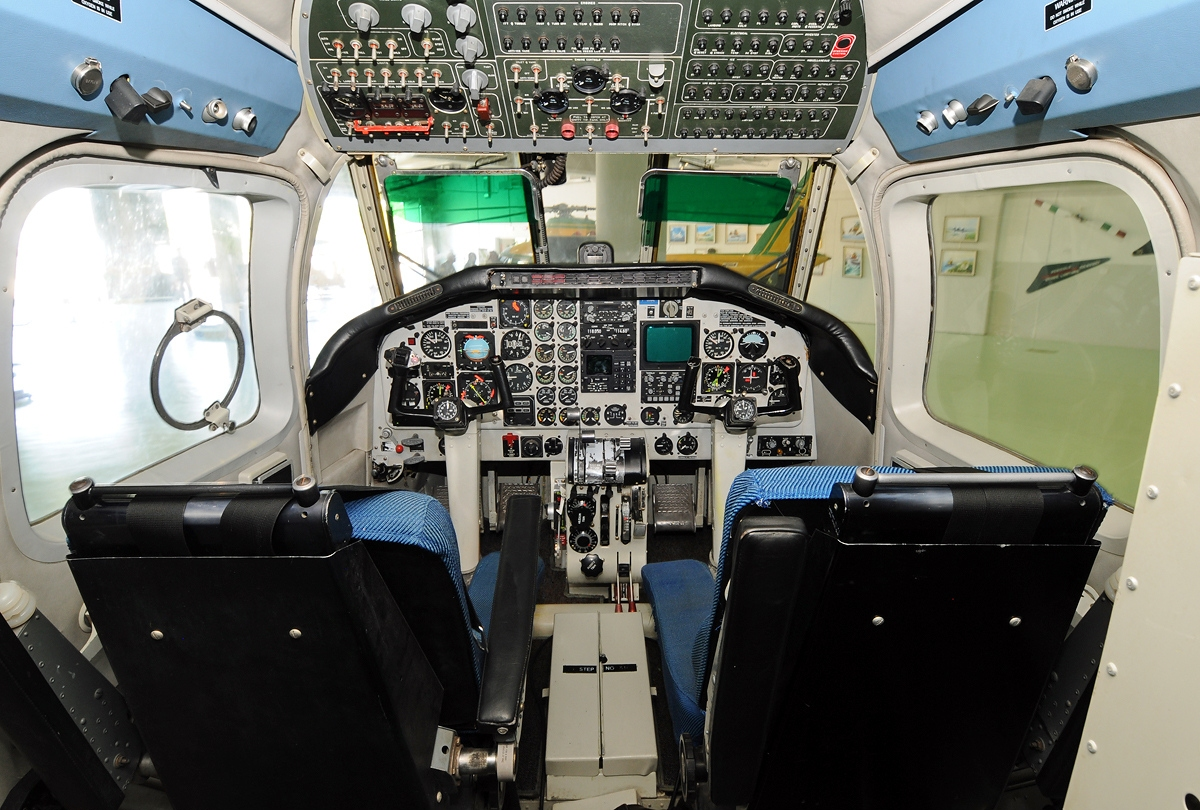
Flight deck

Data from Jane's all the World's Aircraft 1988–89

General characteristics

- Crew: 2
- Capacity: 8 passengers (standard) / mission crew
- Length: 11.88 m (39 ft 0 in)
- Wingspan: 13.51 m (44 ft 4 in) without tip-tanks

14.69 m (48 ft 2.5 in) with tip-tanks

- Height: 5 m (16 ft 5 in)
- Wing area: 26.56 m^{2} (285.9 sq ft)
- Aspect ratio: 7.3
- Airfoil: NACA 230 series
- Empty weight: 2,650 kg (5,842 lb) equipped
- Maximum zero-fuel weight: 3,800 kg (8,378 lb)
- Maximum fuel: 1,139 kg (2,511 lb)
- Maximum payload: 1,073 kg (2,366 lb)
- Maximum ramp weight: 4,320 kg (9,524 lb)
- Maximum landing weight: 3,800 kg (8,378 lb)
- Max takeoff weight: 4,300 kg (9,480 lb)
- Fuel capacity: 2 x 212 L (56 US gal; 47 imp gal) outer wing tanks + 2x 312 L (82 US gal; 69 imp gal) tip-tanks + 1x 118 L (31 US gal; 26 imp gal) fuselage collector-tank
- Auxiliary fuel system: 1 x 236 L (62 US gal; 52 imp gal) optional fuselage tank, with provision for 2x 177 L (47 US gal; 39 imp gal) or 284 L (75 US gal; 62 imp gal) under-wing drop tanks
- Powerplant: 2 × Lycoming LTP 101-700 turboprop engines, 447.5 kW (600 shp) each
- Propellers: 3-bladed Hartzell HC-B3TN-3DL/L10282-9.5, 2.36 m (7 ft 9 in) diameter constant-speed fully-feathering metal pusher propellers

Performance

- Maximum speed: 400 km/h (250 mph, 220 kn) at 3,050 m (10,000 ft)
- Cruise speed: 300 km/h (190 mph, 160 kn) at 3,660 m (12,000 ft)
- Stall speed: 160 km/h (99 mph, 86 kn) flaps up, gear up

139 km/h (86 mph; 75 kn) flaps down, gear down

- Never exceed speed: 407 km/h (253 mph, 220 kn)
- Range: 1,390 km (860 mi, 750 nmi) with maximum payload

2,084 km (1,295 mi; 1,125 nmi) with max standard fuel (wing and tip tanks)

- Service ceiling: 8,535 m (28,000 ft)

4,270 m (14,000 ft) on one engine

- Rate of climb: 11 m/s (2,200 ft/min)

3 m/s (580 ft/min) on one engine

- Wing loading: 162 kg/m^{2} (33 lb/sq ft)
- Power/mass: 0.208 kW/kg (0.127 hp/lb)
- Take-off run to 15 m (50 ft): 665 m (2,180 ft) at MTOW
- Landing run from 15 m (50 ft): 457 m (1,500 ft) at MLW

== See also ==
Related development

- Piaggio P.136
