= Piaggio P.136 =

Amphibious flying boat

P.136/Royal Gull
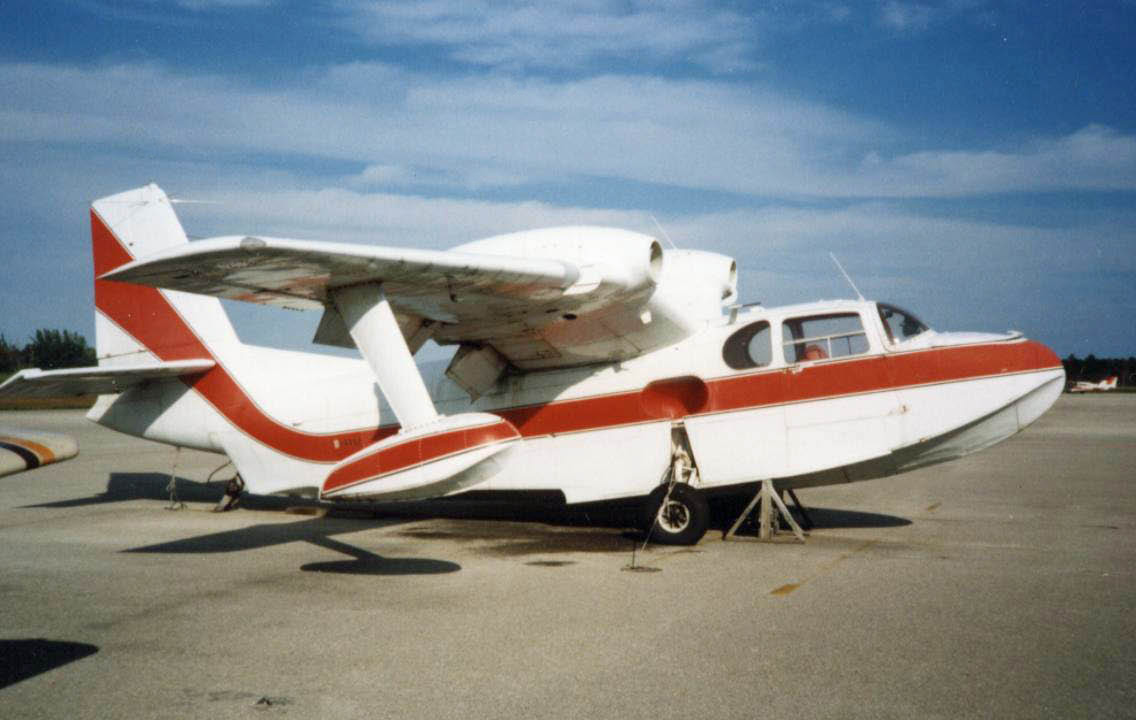
- Piaggio P.136L-2 at Tamiami Airport near Miami in 1989

General information
- Type: Amphibious aircraft
- National origin: Italy
- Manufacturer: Piaggio Aero
- Status: examples still flying in 2018
- Number built: 63

History
- Manufactured: 1948-1961
- Introduction date: 1949
- First flight: 29 August 1948
- Developed into: Piaggio P.166

The Piaggio P.136 is an Italian twin-engine amphibian flying boat designed and manufactured by aircraft company Piaggio Aero. It is furnished with an all-metal hull, pusher propellers, a gull wing, and retractable landing gear.

During late 1948, the P.136 prototype performed its maiden flight; roughly six months later, it reportedly completed certification tests, clearing the type's entry into service. The aircraft was marketed in the United States as the Royal Gull by American distributor Kearney and Trecker. During the late 1950s, a land-based utility aircraft, the Piaggio P.166, was developed from the P.136 and shares many design similarities, despite the deletion of the hull in favour of a conventional fuselage.

== Development ==
During the 1940s, barely a year following the end of the Second World War, Italian aircraft manufacturer Piaggio Aero, being keen to rebuild itself and its customer base in the post-war era, embarked upon the development of a new amphibian design. As noted by Aviation periodical Flight International, this was no simple choice, as many aviation companies had been defeated in their ambitions to develop efficient flying watercraft and required ingenuity to achieve. The design produced by Piaggio was of a relatively large aircraft, yet still being capable of operations from both relatively rough waters and fairly compact grass air strips. Furthermore, large portions of the aircraft, such as its three-bladed constant-speed propellers, was internally designed by the company.

During 1954, Francis K. Trecker, president of Kearney & Trecker Corporation, was impressed when he witnessed a P.136 in flight, and offered to bring the type to the North American market. A new entity, initially known as the Royal Aircraft Corporation, was formed to distribute the aircraft in Canada, the United States, and Mexico. Trecker secured the right to build complete aircraft, but he typically imported partially constructed P.136s from Italy and assembled them with additional American-sourced components and systems. Around 75 engineering modifications were made to the airframe to better suit North American requirements.

== Design ==
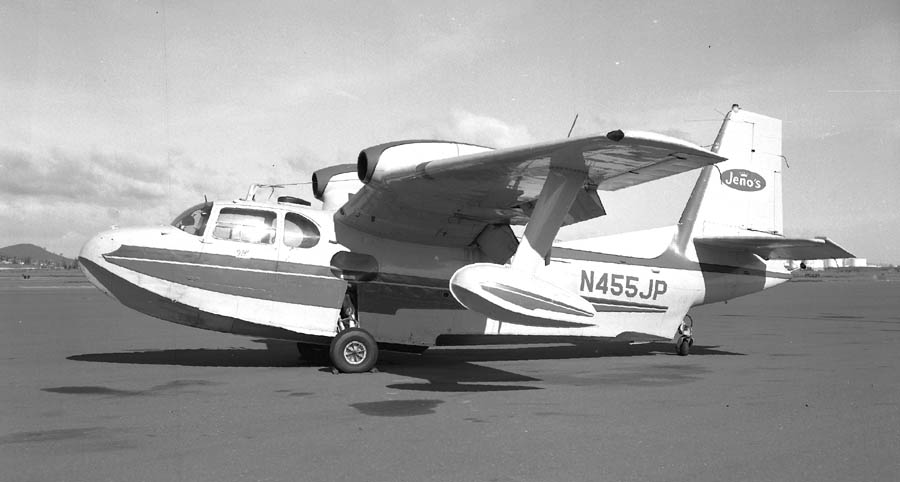
A Piaggio P.136

The Piaggio P.136 was a twin-engine pusher-type amphibian, being capable of carrying a maximum of five people with baggage, or a pair of stretchers and an accompanying medical attendant. While the general configuration and systems remained largely the same across different models, there were some customisations present in the cabin to suit its customer and intended purpose; while military aircraft would often be fitted with alternative instrumentation and radio sets, as well as additional transparent panels in locations like the doors for greater external visibility, civil P.136s would be furnished with more comfortable seating and additional panelling for sound exclusion and heat retention purposes. The aircraft's fuel is stowed in two large metal tanks housed within the hull.

The P.136's pusher configuration confers several advantages, one being that both the propellers and engines are kept well clear of spray and the cabin doors. Cooling of the engines is achieved via large scoops located above the leading edges of the wing. After passing through the engines, this heated air is then channeled at the propellers to keep them free of ice, making any special de-icing apparatus unnecessary. Reportedly, operations revealed that even prolonged taxiing in tropical climates did not lead to any instances of overheating. Another benefit of the aft positioning of the engines is that cabin noise is inherently lessened in the cabin, providing a quieter environment for passengers and pilot alike. The engines typically drove fixed-pitch propellers, although variable-pitch propellers were available as an option for greater performance.

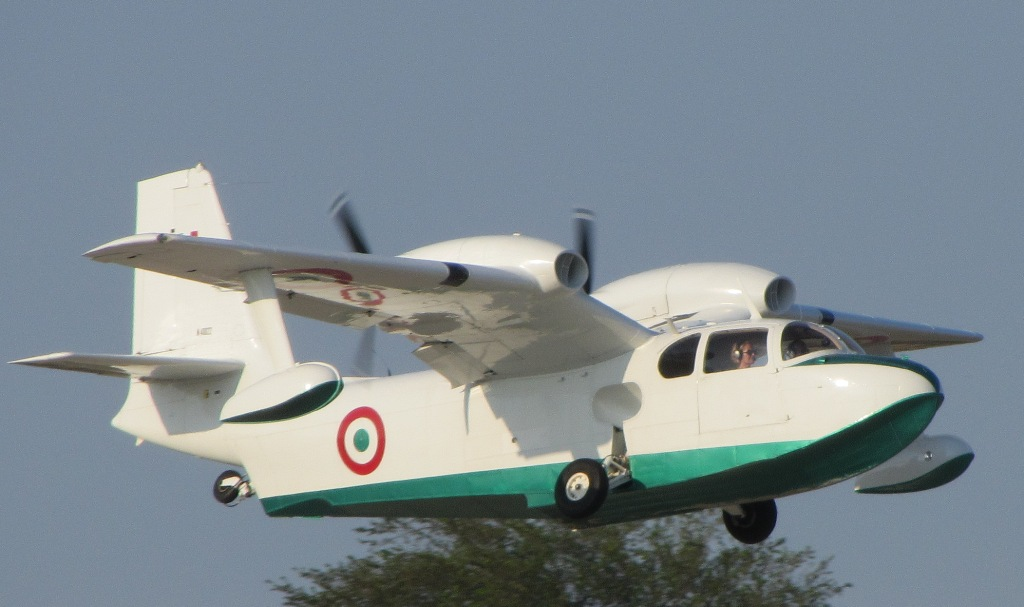
P.136 L-1 during takeoff

Several features of the P.136 are to enhance customer convenience. Access to the cabin is eased by stepping on the spray dam set upon the chine, while a spacious baggage compartment is present to the rear of this cabin; some bulky cargo may also be stowed inside a large chamber accessed via a hatch located just aft of the wing. The top of the fuselage has four hoisting points, intended for use by cranes to lifting the aircraft. For ease of maintenance, only a handful of moves are required to unclip the engine cowlings to directly access the aircraft's powerplants. A starboard windscreen panel controls all mooring and anchoring operations, while full nautical riding and navigation lights are fitted. The aircraft has a total of six sealed bilge compartments, which can be pumped dry via a single hydraulic pump; reportedly, it can remain buoyant even with two compartments flooded.

In terms of its controls and handling, Flight International observed that the P.136's boat hull makes little imposition on its flight characteristics: "As a landplane, it behaves as well as any comparable light twin, except that it pays the penalty of slightly lower cruising speed incurred by its marine capabilities"; the publication also praised its "excellent manoeuvrability" and ability to perform a "very steep approach". All of the flight control surfaces had a fabric covering, these typically being mass-balanced. As common amongst flying boats, both the control wheel and pedal travel are large, aiding in take-off runs to avoid water-based obstructions such as buoys. Water steering is achieved via a large rudder that is linked to cable of the aerodynamic rudder; it is extended by pulling a long wire out of the cabin roof. Highly-effective slotted flaps were positioned in sections on either side of the engine nacelles, full deployment of which rarely being used other than to rapidly decelerate.

== Operational history ==
According to Flight International, the Italian Air Force was the first organisation to place an order for the type. During the 1950s, the Italian Air Force opted to procure a fleet of 14 P.136s, where they were used to conduct coastal patrol and air-sea rescue missions. In addition to military sales, the P. 136 also received orders from civilian operators. A number were purchased by individuals and private operators.

American aircraft manufacturer Kearney and Trecker was appointed as a wholesaler for the type, received three Italian-built P.136s along with the partially assembled fuselages and components for the productions of another 29 examples of the type under a licensing arrangement. The company produced a handful of examples under the Royal Gull brand.

== Variants ==
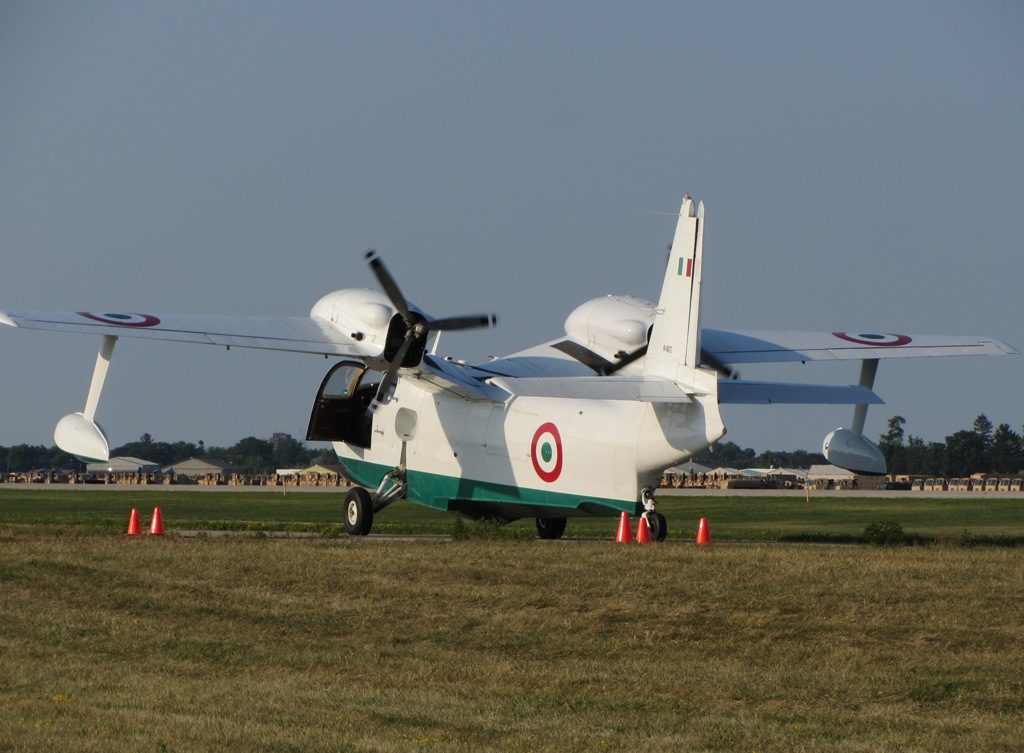
P.136L-1

P.136F
Variant with Franklin engines, mainly produced for the Italian Air Force, 18 built.
P.136L
Variant with Lycoming GO-435 engines, two built and one P.136F converted.
P.136L-1
Five-seat amphibian flying boat, powered by two 201-kW (270-hp) Avco Lycoming GO-480-B engine, 18 built.
P.136L-2
Five-seat amphibian flying boat, powered by two 254-kW (340-hp) Avco Lycoming GSO-480 piston engines, 24-assembled in the United States from Italian supplied kits.
Royal Gull
Both the P.136-L1 and P.136-L2 were marketed in the United States by the Kearney and Trecker Corporation.

== Operators ==
=== Military operators ===
Italy

- Italian Air Force operated 22 aircraft (14 Piaggio P-136F and eight Piaggio P-136L-1s) from 1951 until 1961

Peru

- Peruvian Air Force – four aircraft (one P.136 and three P.136L-2s)

Bangladesh

- Bangladesh Army – one P.136L-1 (registered AP-ALV)

=== Civilian ===
Greece

- Olympic Aviation operated two P.136 L2, including SX-BDC which crashed on take-off from Athens (Ellinikon Airport) on 22 January 1973, resulting in the death of Alexander Onassis

Hong Kong

- Macau Air Transport Company (Hong Kong) Limited operated 1 P.136 L2

== Specifications (P.136-L-2) ==
Data from Jane's All the World's Aircraft 1958-59

General characteristics

- Crew: 2
- Capacity: 3
- Length: 10.8 m (35 ft 5 in)
- Wingspan: 13.53 m (44 ft 5 in)
- Height: 3.83 m (12 ft 7 in)
- Wing area: 25.1 m^{2} (270 sq ft)
- Aspect ratio: 7.4
- Airfoil: NACA 230 series
- Empty weight: 2,110 kg (4,652 lb)
- Gross weight: 2,994 kg (6,601 lb)
- Fuel capacity: 730 L (193 US gal; 161 imp gal) in two hull tanks
- Powerplant: 2 × Lycoming GSO-480 6-cylinder air-cooled horizontally-opposed piston engines, 250 kW (340 hp) each
- Propellers: 3-bladed Piaggio P.1033 or Hartzell HC-83X20-2AL constant-speed fully-feathering propellers

Performance

- Maximum speed: 335 km/h (208 mph, 181 kn) at 2,994 kg (6,601 lb)
- Cruise speed: 268 km/h (167 mph, 145 kn) at 70% rated power at 2,800 m (9,200 ft)
- Stall speed: 110 km/h (68 mph, 59 kn) flaps down
- Range: 1,450 km (900 mi, 780 nmi) 50% power at 4,300 m (14,100 ft)
- Service ceiling: 7,800 m (25,600 ft)

3,600 m (11,800 ft) on one engine

- Wing loading: 119.3 kg/m^{2} (24.4 lb/sq ft)
- Power/mass: 0.169 kW/kg (0.103 hp/lb)

== See also ==
- Short Sealand

Related development

- Piaggio P.166
