= 2026 Butler PAC P-750 crash =

Plane crash in Missouri, United States

- A photo of the crash site

Occurrence
- Date: June 14, 2026
- Summary: Under investigation
- Site: Butler, Missouri, United States; 38.291°N 94.343°W

Aircraft
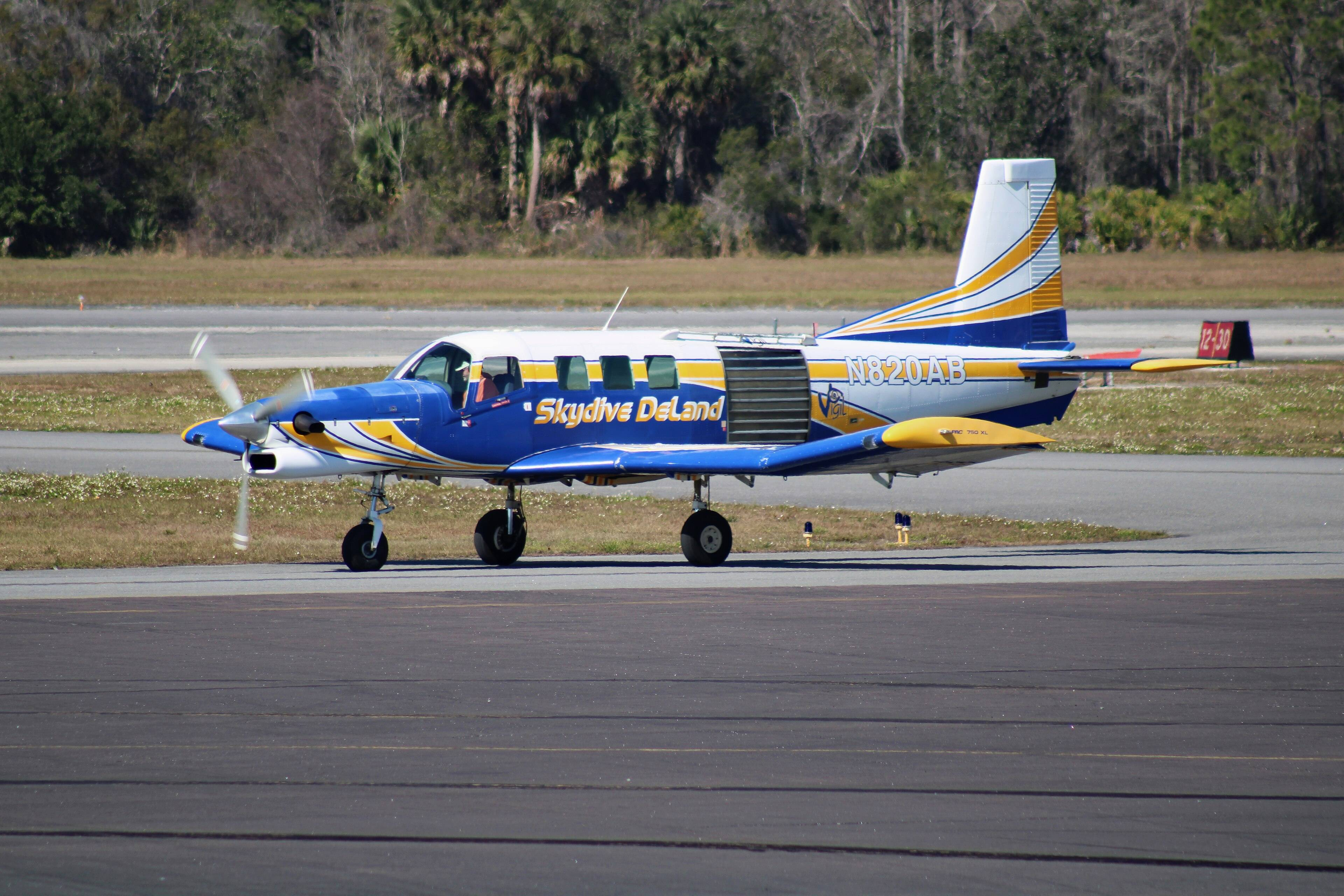
- A PAC P-750 XSTOL similar to the aircraft involved
- Aircraft type: PAC P-750 XSTOL
- Operator: Skyhi Aero LLC, operated by Skydive Kansas City
- Registration: N221BN
- Flight origin: Butler Memorial Airport, Butler, Missouri, U.S.
- Destination: Butler Memorial Airport, Butler, Missouri, U.S.
- Occupants: 12
- Passengers: 11
- Crew: 1
- Fatalities: 12
- Survivors: 0

On June 14, 2026, a PAC P-750 XSTOL skydiving aircraft crashed in Butler, Missouri, United States, killing all 12 occupants. The aircraft was a private plane operated by Skydive Kansas City, which departed from Butler Memorial Airport. The plane crashed near a highway. The accident was the deadliest skydiving plane crash in the United States since the September 1995 crash of a Beechcraft Queen Air near West Point, Virginia.

== Background ==
=== Aircraft ===
The aircraft involved was N221BN, a fixed-wing PAC P-750 XSTOL manufactured in 2010 by Pacific Aerospace in New Zealand and operated by Skyhi Aero LLC on behalf of Skydive Kansas City. The aircraft was powered by a single Pratt & Whitney Canada engine. Federal Aviation Administration (FAA) records show that the aircraft's current registration certificate had been issued in January 2023 and was set to expire in January 2030.

=== Passengers and crew ===
Eleven skydivers and a pilot were on board the aircraft. Nine of the skydivers were experienced, while two others were going to participate in tandem jumps. Among the skydivers were a North Kansas City music teacher, a father, and a Vietnam War veteran.

== Accident ==
The aircraft seconds before crashing

While climbing, at around 98 feet (30 m) of altitude, the aircraft stalled, then made a sharp left turn and impacted the ground in a nose down position. A witness said the aircraft completely shattered upon impact and the skydivers didn't have time to jump. First responders received a 911 call shortly before 11:30 a.m. that a skydiving plane crashed just after takeoff. The plane crashed on airport property and was destroyed by a post-crash fire.

== Investigation ==
The National Transportation Safety Board (NTSB) and the FAA confirmed they are investigating the crash. The NTSB said weight, balance, or engine failure on takeoff might have caused the crash.
