= 27 Squadron SAAF =

27 Squadron
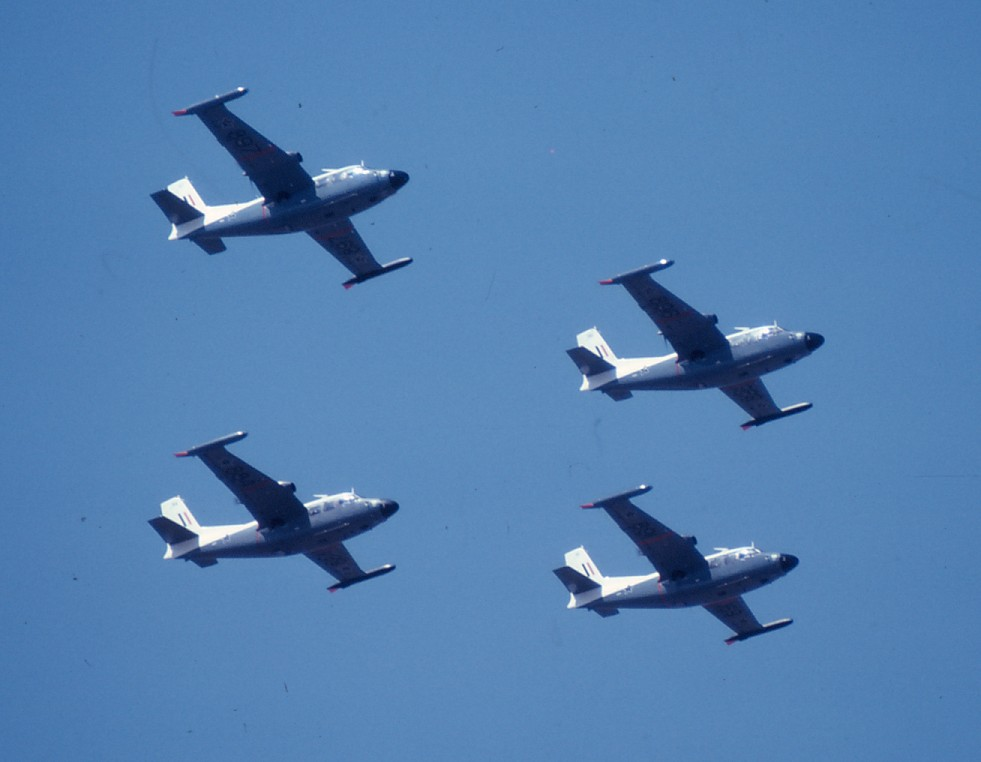
- Piaggio P166S Albatross formation of 27 Squadron
- Active: 1942–1945; 1951–1958; 1962–1990
- Country: (South Africa)
- Branch: South African Air Force
- Role: Maritime Patrol
- Motto(s): "Protegimus" We Protect

Insignia
- Squadron Identification Code: "L" and later "R" (World War II)
- Squadron Crest

27 Squadron was established as a World War II maritime patrol squadron of the South African Air Force. It was disbanded after the war and resurrected in the same role from 1951 to 1958. Its final period of service was from 1962 to 1990 when it was finally disbanded when its Piaggio Albatross aircraft were de-commissioned.

== History ==
27 Squadron was founded on 24 August 1942 at Eerste River, out of the aircrew and ground staff of 8 Squadron which had been disbanded the month before. It was placed under control of the RAF's Coastal Command and employed as a coastal reconnaissance/patrol unit, flying Lockheed Ventura Mk. IV aircraft, performing convoy escort and anti-submarine warfare patrols, or conducting operations off the South African west coast. One flight was based at Aus and the rest of the squadron flew from Walvis Bay and Rooikop in the Mandate territory of South West Africa. Between February and April 1943 a squadron detachment was deployed to Darling in the south western Cape to patrol the northern and western approaches to Cape Town harbour. (Note: On 12 April 1943, Ventura number 6457 flew into Dassenberg mountain near Darling shortly after take-off on a training flight, killing the entire crew of six. On 12 April 1988 the wreckage was discovered by members of the SAAF Museum and was airlifted off Dassenberg by a Puma helicopter of 22 Sqn. The remains are currently stored at the South African Air Force Museum. Darling Airfield in World War II)

The Commanding Officer of 27 Squadron, Colonel Thys Uys, has been lauded for leading the “Skeleton Coast” rescue when the MV Dunedin Star ran aground, and a call for aid came from the helpless men, women, and children marooned on a desert beach. The men of the South African Naval Forces, the South African Air Force, the South African Army, the South African Police, the South African Railways and Harbours Administration and, last but not least, the Royal Navy, got together and, between them, pulled off what was an amazing rescue. As Field-Marshal J.C. Smuts would write, “They overcame almost superhuman difficulties and, by sheer courage and determination, saved everyone, though two of the rescuers sacrificed their lives in doing so. We salute them, one and all. They proved themselves heroes.”

In June 1944, the squadron was moved to the Western Mediterranean Theatre, where their Venturas were upgraded to Ventura Mk.Vs. One flight was based at La Senia in Algeria and commenced anti-submarine patrols on 18 July 1944. A second flight was deployed to Hal Far in Malta, also on anti-submarine duties and re-joined the squadron in October 1944.

In November 1944, one flight returned to AFS Swartkop in South Africa via Egypt, arriving home in January 1945. The remaining flights were converted to Vickers Warwick Vs and Vickers Wellington XIVs between February and March 1945. By this time the squadron had been moved to RAF Gianaclis in Egypt and were flying air-sea rescue missions until this duty was taken over by the Royal Air Force's 621 Squadron. After handing over to the RAF, the squadron returned to South Africa and was disbanded in December 1945.

The squadron was reconstituted at AFB Ysterplaat in January 1951 as a part-time maritime patrol unit, still equipped with Venturas Vs until 1958 when it was again disbanded. It remained inactive until October 1962 when it was re-established at AFB Ysterplaat for inshore maritime reconnaissance duties. It was initially equipped with Douglas C-47s and the squadron received Piaggio P-166S Albatross maritime patrol aircraft in 1969. On receipt of the new aircraft, the squadron moved to Cape Town International Airport from which it operated, as a maritime patrol squadron, until October 1990 when it was disbanded for the last time. The Cape Town Club maintains a wall of Memorabilia in honour of SAAF aviators fallen in defence of the Empire.

== Aircraft ==
Aircraft flown by 27 Squadron
Note: Aircraft type photographs may not necessarily represent aircraft of the same mark or actual aircraft belonging to the squadron.
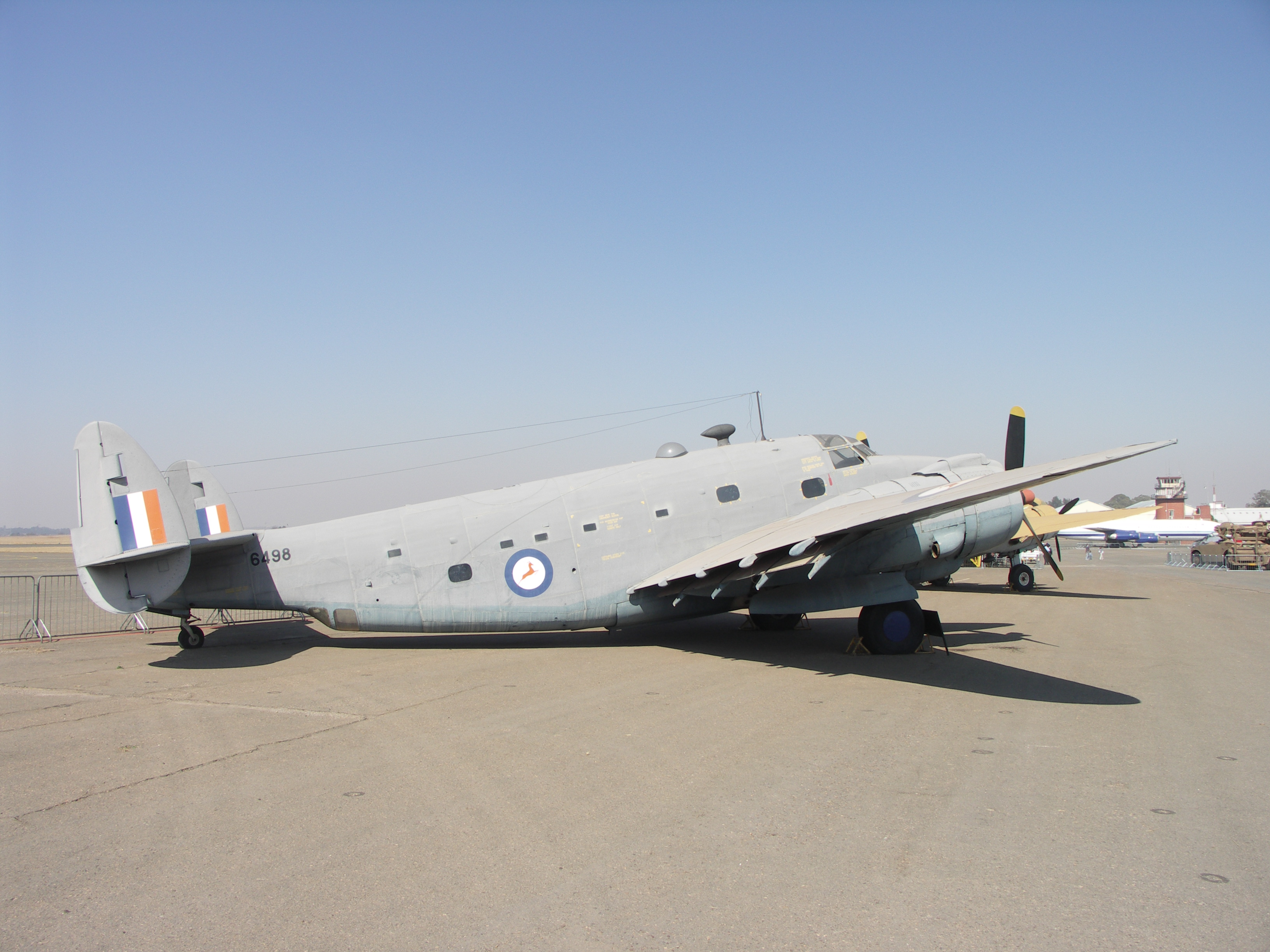
PV1 Ventura
1942-1945, 1951-1958

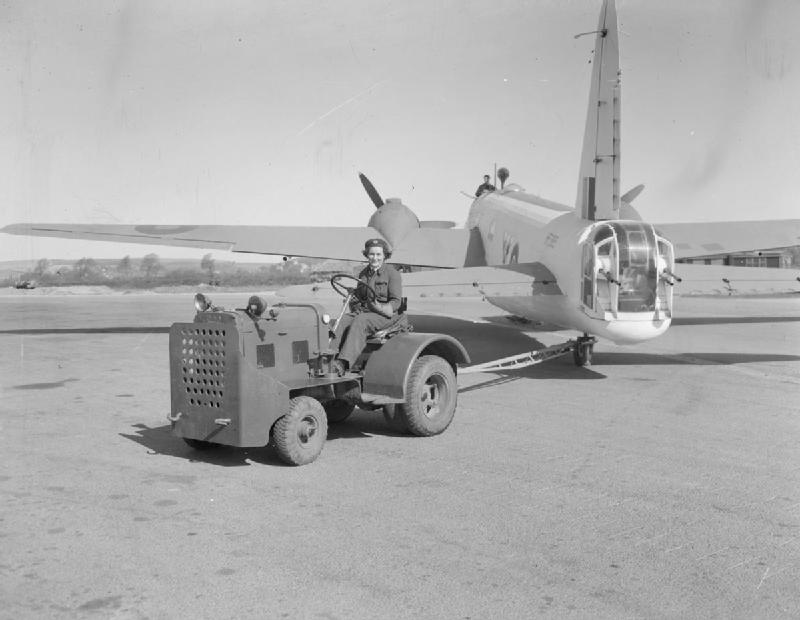
Vickers Wellington XIV
1945

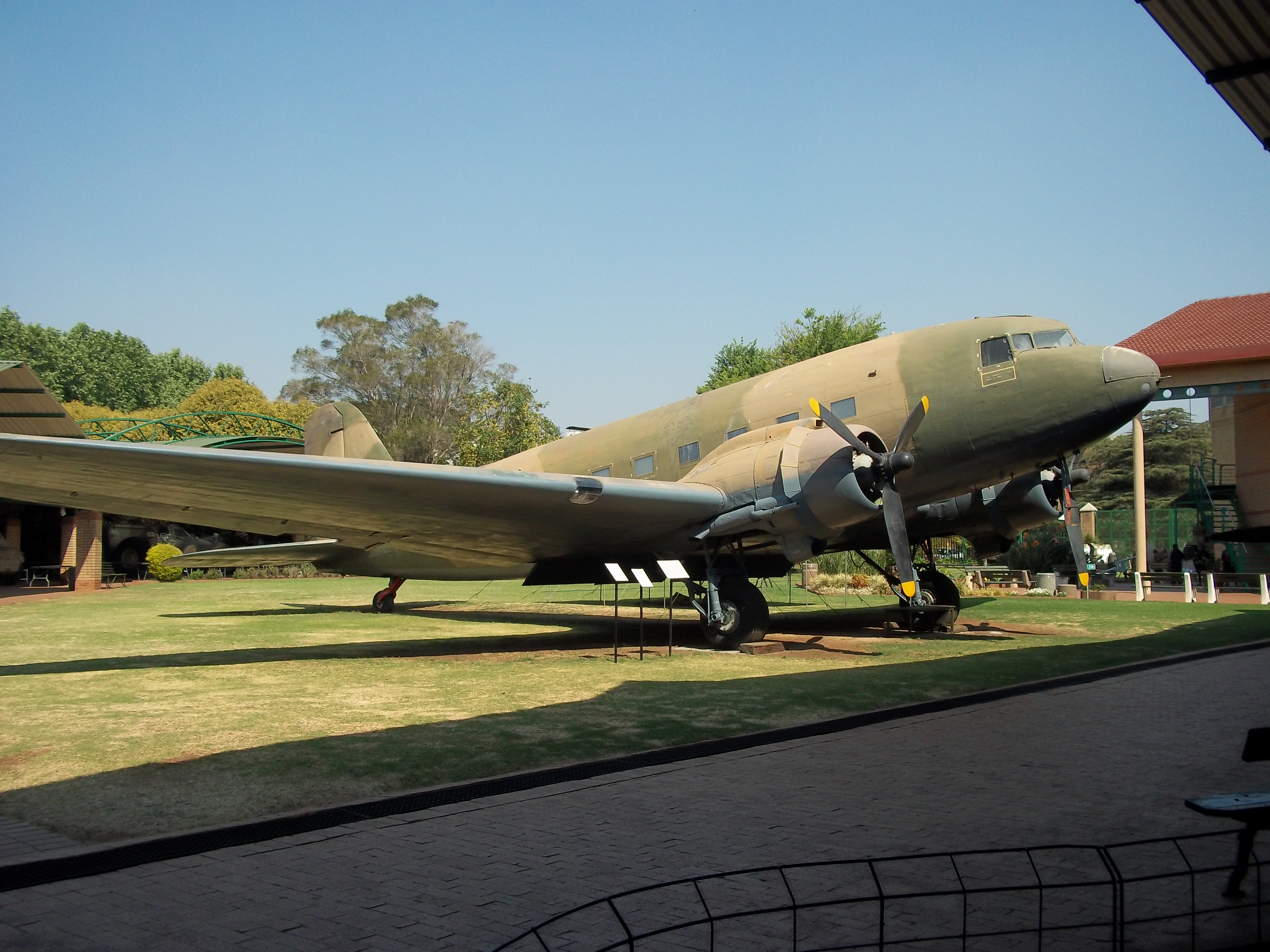
C-47 Dakota
1962-1969

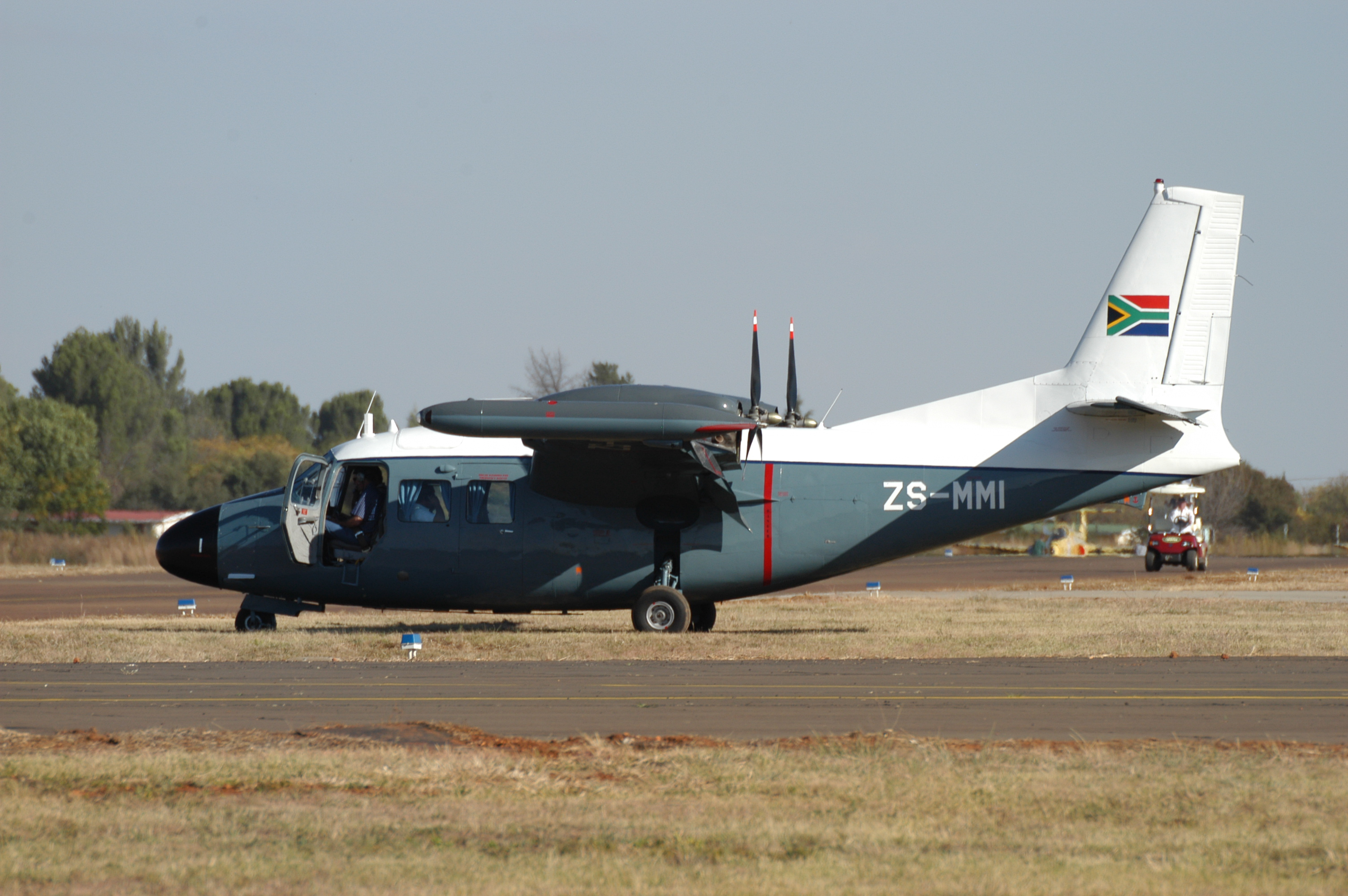
P166S Albatross
1969-1990
