= 2011 South Africa Piaggio Albatross crash =

Aviation accident

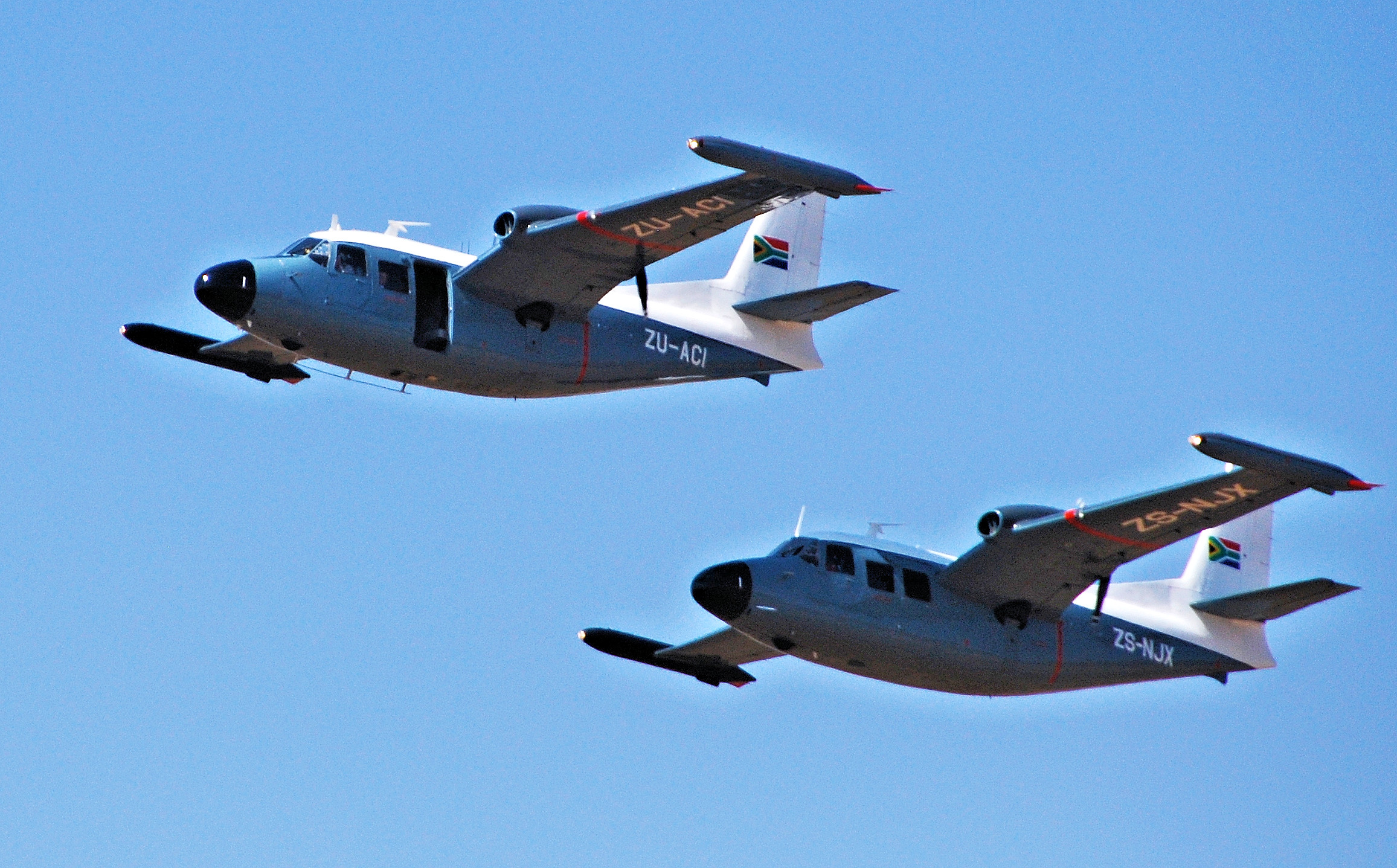
- ZS-NJX (right) in formation with another ex-SAAF Piaggio Albatross in September 2010

Accident
- Date: 14 August 2011
- Summary: Controlled flight into terrain
- Site: Mamotswiri Peak, Limpopo, South Africa; 24°05.107′S 030°11.230′E (ZS-NJX)
- Total fatalities: 13
- Total survivors: 0

First aircraft
- Type: Piaggio P.166S Albatross
- Registration: ZS-NJX
- Flight origin: Tzaneen Airfield, Tzaneen, South Africa
- Destination: Rand Airport, Germiston, South Africa
- Occupants: 6
- Passengers: 5
- Crew: 1
- Fatalities: 6
- Survivors: 0

Second aircraft
- Type: Piaggio P.166S Albatross
- Registration: ZU-MMI
- Flight origin: Tzaneen Airfield, Tzaneen, South Africa
- Destination: Rand Airport, Germiston, South Africa
- Occupants: 7
- Passengers: 6
- Crew: 1
- Fatalities: 7
- Survivors: 0

On 14 August 2011, a pair of privately owned Piaggio P.166 Albatross aircraft crashed into the Wolkberg mountains in the Limpopo province of South Africa, killing all 13 people on board both planes. The aircraft had departed minutes earlier from Tzaneen, and were flying in formation towards Johannesburg when they struck the mountain in cloud.

The subsequent investigation found no evidence of any technical problem with the aircraft and cited adverse weather and poor flight planning as factors in the accident.

== History of the flight ==
The two Albatross aircraft had participated the previous day in the Tzaneen Air Show, and in the morning of 14 August at around 10:20 local time, they took off from Tzaneen Airfield to return to Rand Airport in Johannesburg. Each aircraft had one pilot on board; one aircraft had five passengers and the other one six. The pair set off on a southerly heading flying in formation.

After failing to arrive at Johannesburg, at 13:30 the aircraft were reported missing, and a search and rescue operation was launched. No distress call was received by air traffic control or other aircraft. Hampered by adverse weather and by the fact that no flight plan had been filed by either pilot, search teams were able to locate the wreckage of the aircraft only two days later.

Both aircraft had collided with a north-facing, near-vertical escarpment on the slopes of Mamotswiri Peak, in the Wolkberg mountain range, and were completely destroyed by the impact and subsequent fire. The two wreckages were found 75 metres (250 feet) apart at the foot of the cliff, at an altitude of 5,030 ft (1,530 m), around 300 ft (90 m) below the top of the ridge. There were no survivors.

On the day of the accident, a witness in the Lekgalameetse Valley reported seeing both aircraft overflying the valley before disappearing into low clouds. A loud bang was heard shortly after.

== Aircraft ==
The aircraft involved were both twin-engined Piaggio P.166S Albatross, with registrations ZS-NJX and ZU-MMI, serial numbers 446 and 462. They were built in 1973 as coastal patrol, search and rescue aircraft for the South African Air Force, but subsequently retired and sold to private owners.

The accident investigation found that both aircraft were properly maintained, and that no major problems had emerged during their recent mandatory periodic inspections. None of the aircraft was fitted with either flight data recorders or emergency locator transmitters, and there was no regulatory requirement to fit such equipments.

== Crew and passengers ==
The pilot of ZS-NJX held a commercial pilot licence and had logged around 4,300 hours of flight in total. He also held an instrument rating, and during the accident flight he was leading the formation. The pilot of ZU-MMI, instead, held a private pilot licence with approximately 2,900 hours, and was not instrument-rated. Both pilots had flown in and out of Tzaneen on numerous occasions before.

The 11 passengers were South African nationals, some returning to the country for a holiday, and included two children.

== Investigation ==
The South African Civil Aviation Authority (SACAA) was in charge of the accident investigation. In its final report, it concluded that the probable cause of the crash was controlled flight into terrain, and cited as contributory factors "lack of proper flight planning" and low clouds present in the Wolkberg area at the time of the flight. No evidence was found of any pre-existing defects or mechanical problems with either aircraft.
