= PAC P-750 XSTOL =

Utility transport aircraft

P-750 XSTOL
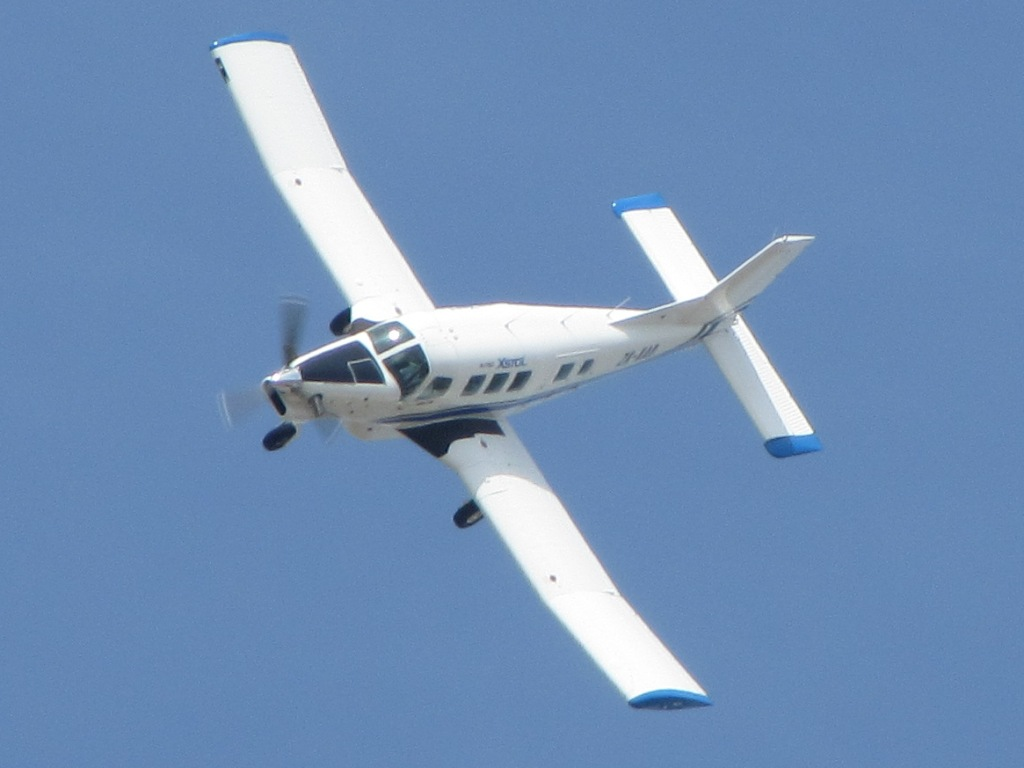

General information
- Type: Utility aircraft
- National origin: New Zealand
- Manufacturer: Pacific Aerospace
- Status: Active, in production
- Number built: 120

History
- Manufactured: 2001–present
- First flight: 2001
- Developed from: PAC Cresco

The PAC P-750 XSTOL (formerly known as the PAC 750XL) is a utility aircraft manufactured by Pacific Aerospace of a conventional all-metal low-wing monoplane design, with fixed tricycle gear/undercarriage. Combining the engine and wings of the PAC Cresco with a new larger fuselage and modified tail, all versions to date have been powered by a 560 kW (750 shp) Pratt & Whitney Canada PT6 turboprop. It is designed and manufactured in Hamilton, New Zealand, by Pacific Aerospace Limited.

== Development ==
The PAC 750XL made its maiden flight in 2001. As with the Cresco, horizontal tail surfaces presented difficulties, and these were redesigned before the type entered production. The aircraft received full US FAA certification in March 2004 and was subsequently renamed "P-750 XSTOL".

In 2008, the manufacturer stated production was increasing from 12 to 24 per year. In 2008, there was some New Zealand media criticism of government assistance for the manufacturer following cancellation of a large order. By February 2016, 100 aircraft had been produced, and over 120 by January 2019.

In 2012, Pacific Aerospace achieved certification for the P-750 XSTOL against ICAO Annex 6 for Single Engine IFR Commercial Passenger Transport Operations.

Pacific Aerospace has allowed licence production in China. A civil cargo PAC750XL UAV with minimal changes to enable remote piloting has been flown in China. This UAV is not endorsed by the New Zealand manufacturer and is a separate entity.

In March 2018, Pacific Aerospace launched an updated variant, the SuperPac 750XL-II, with a 670 kW (900 shp) PT6A-140A, and a four-blade 270 cm (108 in) Hartzell propeller. It competes with the Supervan 900 re-engined Cessna 208 Caravan with a 670 kW (900 shp) Honeywell TPE331 and 280 cm (110 in) four-blade Hartzell propeller.

To increase payload, a weight-reduction programme for 2020 replaces flight-control surfaces in aluminium with composite, installs lighter seating, and strips out cabin components. The passenger and utility aircraft markets account for 70% of its sales.

=== F-25 ===
Financed by UK start-up Arcus Fire, the F-25 is an aerial firefighting variant, scheduled to secure its supplemental type certificate in 2021. The $2.2 million aircraft competes against other types like the Polish PZL Dromader, targeting a 100 units market within five years. The conversion includes a new hydraulics pack, fire gate and a 300 kg (600 lb) increase in payload.

== Design ==
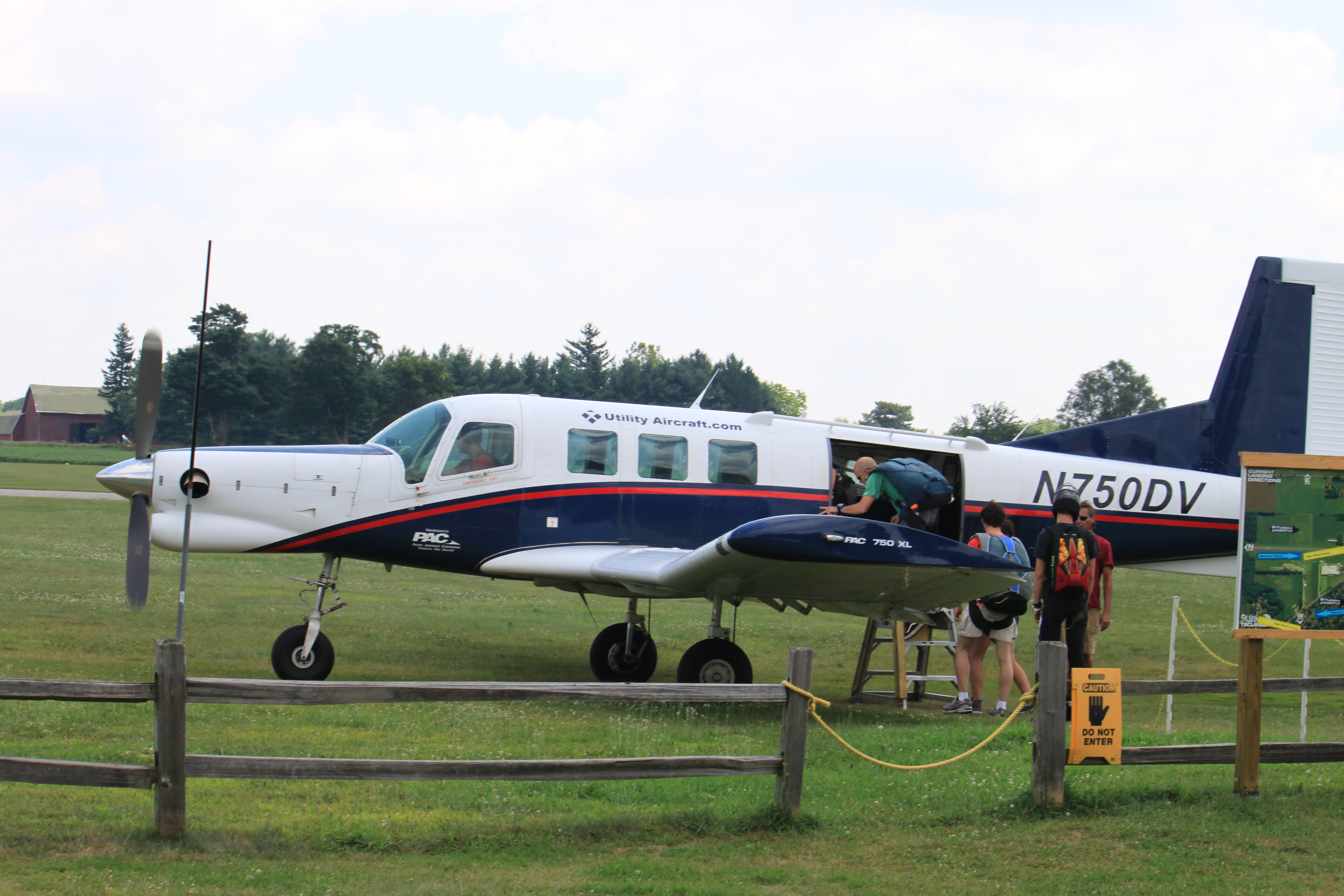
PAC-750 XL used for skydiving. Meyers-Diver's Airport, Tecumseh, Michigan

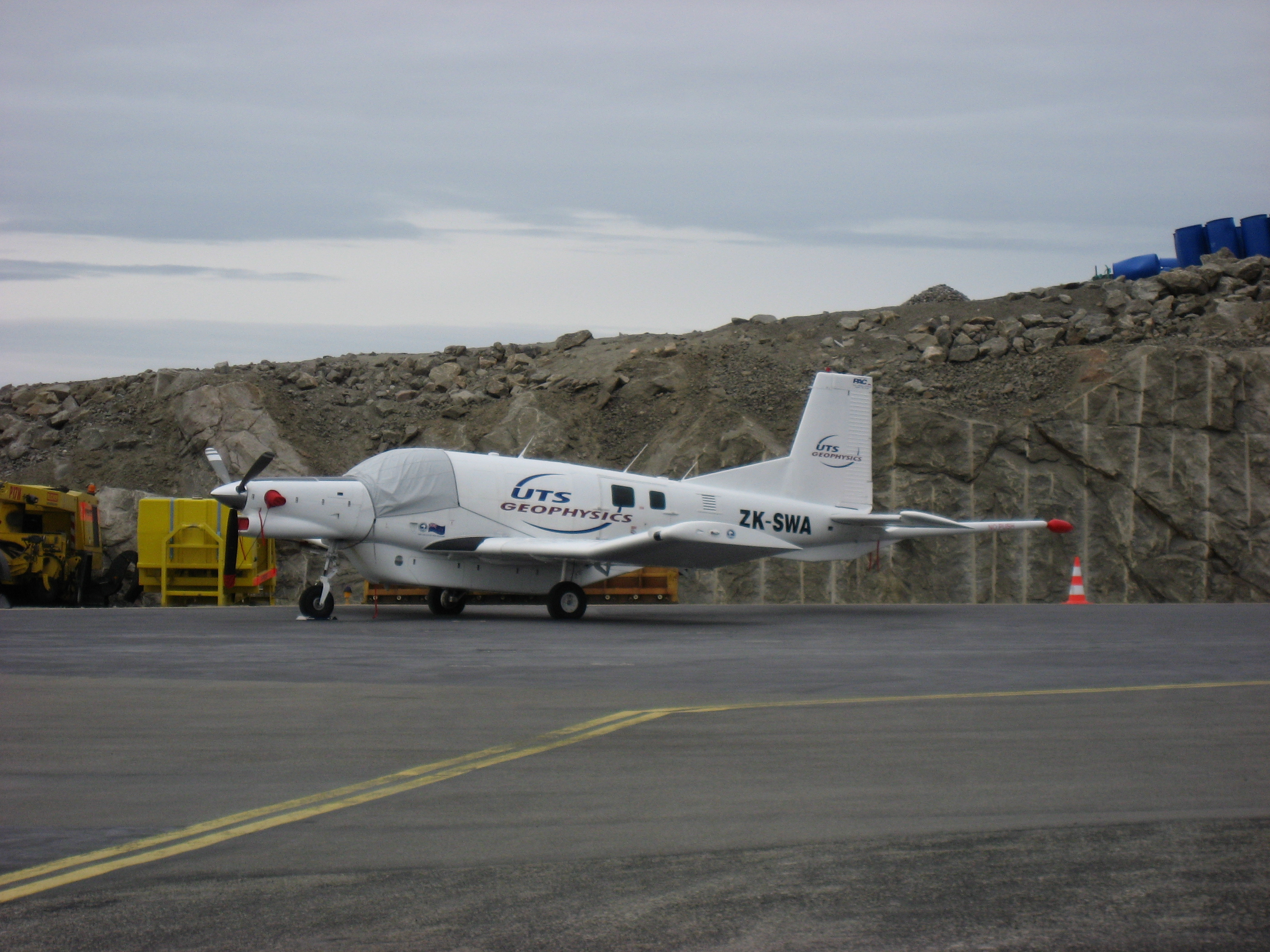
PAC-750 XL geosurvey aircraft with Magnetic anomaly detector (MAD) stinger in Upernavik, Greenland

The type was targeted initially to the narrow market of skydiving. In the parachuting role, the high-lift wings from the Cresco and relatively high power-to-weight ratio enable the PAC 750 to take a load of parachutists to 12,000 feet (3,700 m) and return to land in 10 minutes.

A wider market was subsequently sought, and examples have been sold for use in utility roles, including freight, agricultural applications, passenger operations, aerial photography and surveying. Twelve aircraft have now been extensively modified for geo-survey work, by fitting a magnetic anomaly detector sting tail. Proposed ski and float conversions have yet to fly. The P-750 XSTOL is used in South Africa by NatureLink on United Nations Humanitarian Air Services / World Food Programme contracts. While the manufacturer claims lower single-engine running costs than many other utility types, for example, the twin-engined DHC-6 Twin Otter, the type has less usable volume (large cargo panniers provide a partial solution). Due to the unique wing design the P-750 is capable of carrying a higher payload than the larger Cessna 208 Caravan.

The aircraft is currently marketed as the P-750 XSTOL. Pacific Aerospace offers the P-750 XSTOL in many configurations - passenger, freight/cargo, skydive, agricultural, aerial survey and surveillance. The aircraft is marketed as excelling on rough, unpaved airstrips and is available with a wide tyre modification for this purpose. A modified version is being developed for counter-insurgency and light attack.

For passenger and cargo operations, the cabin can be outfitted with up to nine passenger seats or with cargo holds. There is also an optional 450 kg (1,000 lb) capacity cargo pod available which attaches to the belly of the aircraft. The aircraft can be configured as all-passenger, all-cargo or a combination of both. All variants have double cargo doors at the rear of the cabin.

== Military use ==
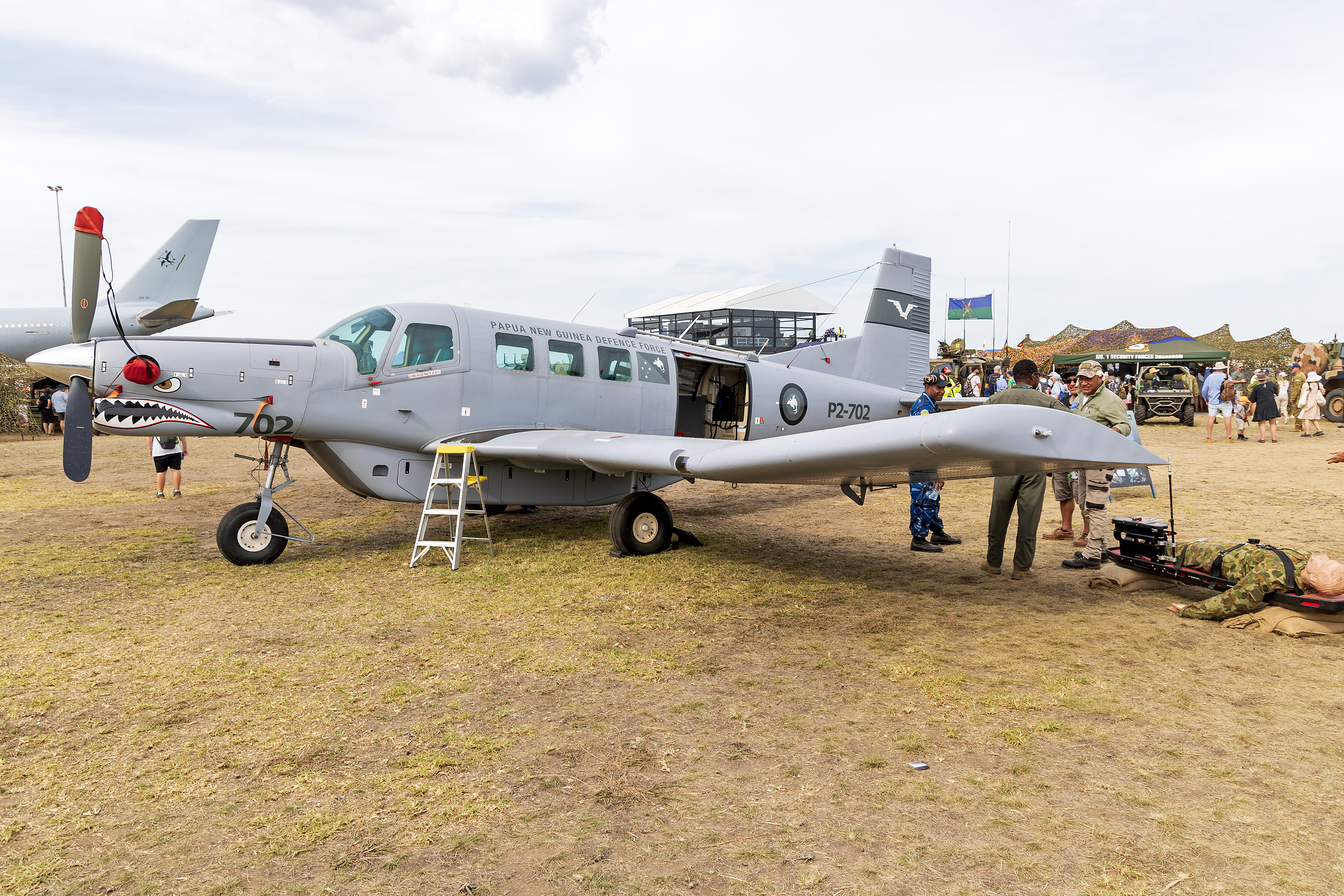
A Papua New Guinea Defence Force PAC-750 XSTOL at the 2025 Avalon Airshow.

In February 2016, the Papua New Guinea Defence Force (PNGDF) signed an agreement to purchase four aircraft. The PNGDF purchased one P-750 for the Air Transport Wing which was delivered in 2018. In 2023, the Australian government gifted two new P-750s to the PNGDF.

== North Korean appearance incident ==
A P-750 XSTOL in the markings of the North Korean state airline was photographed during the Wonsan Air Festival on September 24–25, 2016. The aircraft had been sold to China in September 2015 and then illegally exported to North Korea. Pacific Aerospace expressed surprise, however New Zealand Customs discovered that even after the company was aware the aircraft was in North Korea some of the company staff had planned to sell replacement parts for the aircraft to a Chinese company. In October 2017, Pacific Aerospace pleaded guilty to three charges of planning to export aircraft parts indirectly to North Korea, and another charge relating to incorrect completion of export documentation.

== Operators ==
=== Military ===
Papua New Guinea

- Papua New Guinea Defence Force

North Korea

- Korean People's Army Air Force (acquired illegally)

United Arab Emirates

- United Arab Emirates Air Force

== Accidents and incidents ==
- On 26 February 2016, an Air Kasthamandap PAC 750XL aircraft with eleven people on board crashed at Chilkhaya in Kalikot District, Nepal, killing two crew members and injuring all nine passengers on board.
- August 11, 2018 - A PAC 750XL aircraft of Dimonim Air registration PK-HVQ was reported missing on a flight between Tanah Merah Airport and Oksibil Airport, Papua, Indonesia. The flight should have had a duration of 42 minutes but failed to arrive at Oksibil. Search operations were conducted. Some people in a village reported they heard loud sounds and an explosion. There were two pilots and seven passengers aboard. The wreckage of the plane was located near Oksibil Airport. Eight occupants died in the crash; a boy was the only survivor.
- On June 14, 2026, a PAC 750XL, registration N221BN, crashed at the Butler, Missouri airport (KBUM), killing all 12 onboard (11 skydivers and the pilot).
- On September 7, 2026, a PAC750XL operated by Niugini Aviation crashed during a flight from Mount Hagen Airport to Simbai Airport in the Highlands of Papua New Guinea killing all 4 on board.

== Specifications ==
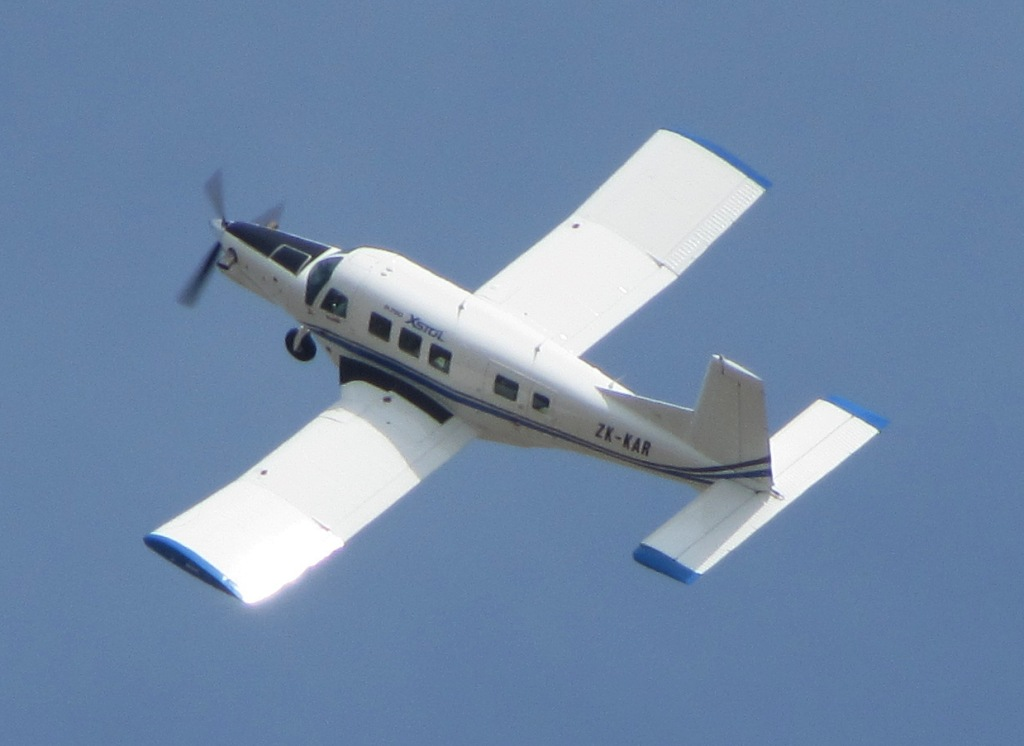
PAC-750 on a Standard Takeoff Procedure

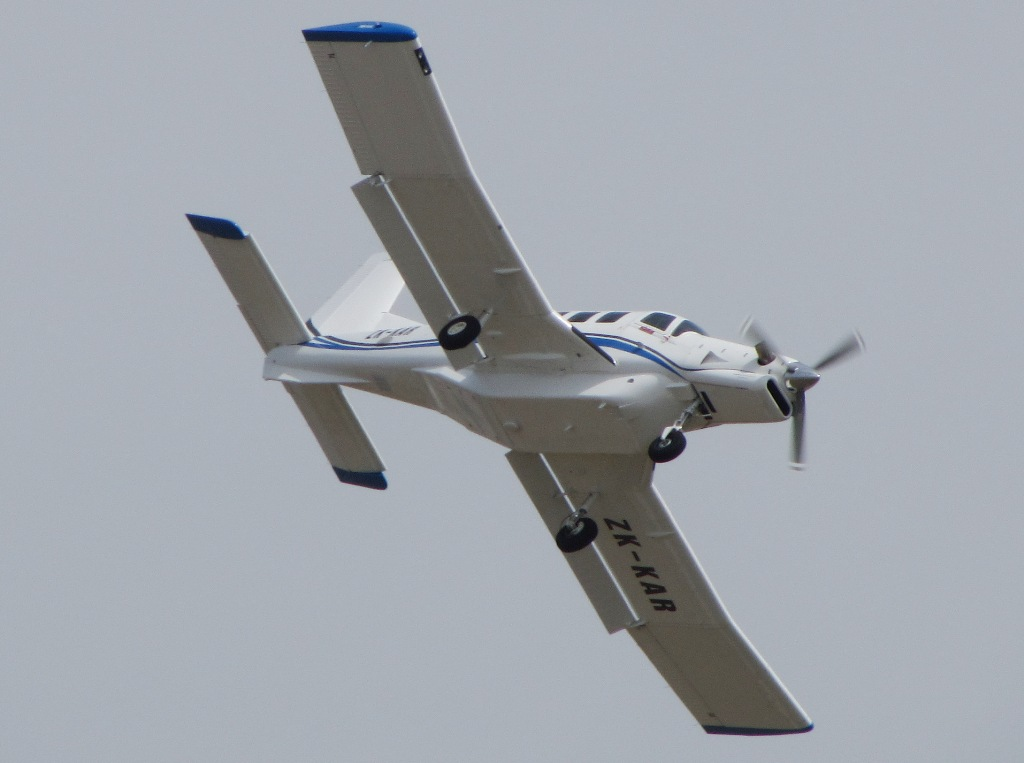
PAC-750 on an Air Demonstration Flyby

Data from Pacific Aerospace

General characteristics

- Crew: one (pilot)
- Capacity: Pilot + nine passengers or 17 parachutists
- Length: 11.11 m (36 ft 5 in)
- Wingspan: 12.8 m (42 ft 0 in)
- Height: 3.88 m (12 ft 9 in)
- Wing area: 24.88 m^{2} (267.8 sq ft)
- Aspect ratio: 6.59
- Empty weight: 1,633 kg (3,600 lb)
- Max takeoff weight: 3,402 kg (7,500 lb)
- Powerplant: 1 × Pratt & Whitney Canada PT6A-34 turboprop, 560 kW (750 hp)

Performance

- Maximum speed: 315 km/h (196 mph, 170 kn)
- Cruise speed: 259 km/h (161 mph, 140 kn)
- Stall speed: 107 km/h (66 mph, 58 kn) Idle Power, Flaps Down
- Range: 2,183 km (1,356 mi, 1,179 nmi)
- Endurance: 8h
- Service ceiling: 6,096 m (20,000 ft)
- Rate of climb: 5.42 m/s (1,067 ft/min)
- Take-Off Ground Roll: 220 m (720 ft) (ISA, SL)
- Landing Ground Roll (excl. approach from 15 m AGL): 166 m (545 ft) (SL)

== See also ==
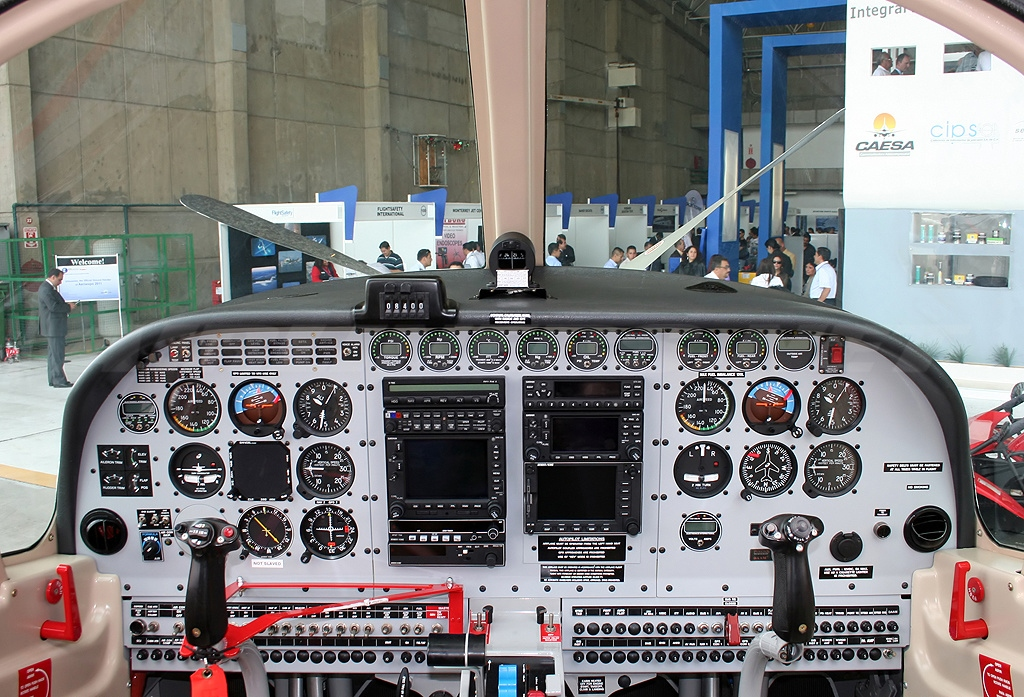
Flight deck of the PAC-750

Related development

- PAC Cresco
- Fletcher FU-24

Aircraft of comparable role, configuration, and era

- Cessna 208 Caravan
- Daher Kodiak
- Pilatus PC-6 Porter
- Socata TBM
