= NZAero =

Aircraft manufacturing company based in New Zealand

- Type: Private
- Industry: Aerospace
- Founded: 1982
- Headquarters: Hamilton, New Zealand
- Area served: Worldwide
- Website: www.aerospace.co.nz

NZSkydive Ltd, trading as NZAero, is an aircraft manufacturing company based in Hamilton, New Zealand. Along with its predecessors, it has sold more than 700 utility, training and agricultural aircraft. The company replaced Pacific Aerospace Ltd, which became insolvent and was liquidated in 2021.

== History ==
Pacific Aerospace was formed from two companies, Air Parts (NZ) Ltd and Aero Engine Services Ltd. Air Parts imported Fletcher FU-24s in kit form during the mid-1950s and began manufacturing a significantly-modified variant, known as the PAC Fletcher, in 1965. Aero Engine Services Ltd diversified from maintenance work into taking over production of the Victa Airtourer, a light aircraft it developed into a military trainer, the PAC CT/4 in the early 1970s. The two firms joined in 1973 as New Zealand Aerospace Industries, which became Pacific Aerospace Corporation in 1982.

Shortly afterward, Pacific Aerospace won contracts to provide components to Boeing and Airbus. Pacific Aerospace took over NZAI's work on a replacement for the Fletcher, which became the PAC Cresco and has in turn developed this into utility and skydiving variants. A new utility aircraft, the P-750 XSTOL, first flew in 2001. The company has also continued low-level CT4 production for over 30 years.

In September 2005, an American firm's order for 12 PAC 750s was dishonoured, leading to controversy about government assistance to Pacific Aerospace.

In 2006, a consortium of aviation professionals purchased the assets of the company and Pacific Aerospace Corporation became Pacific Aerospace Limited.

In 2012, the Pacific Aerospace P-750 XSTOL aircraft was certified against ICAO Annex 6 for Single Engine IFR Passenger Transport Operations.

In 2017, the company pleaded guilty to breaching United Nations Security Council Resolution 1718 against North Korea after a PAC P-750 XSTOL was observed flying at the Wonsan International Friendship Air Festival in September 2016.

In February 2021, the company notified the CAA that it is insolvent, whilst it was unable to meet its obligations under the Civil Aviation Act. The New Zealand civil aviation authority suspended Pacific Aerospace's AOC.

In April 2021, the company was bought out of administration by NZSkydive Ltd, continuing to trade under the Pacific Aerospace name. The trading name changed to NZAero on 1 November 2023.

== List of aircraft ==
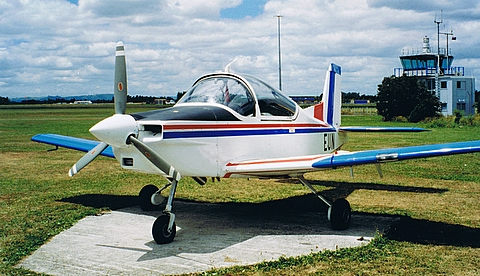
Prototype CT-4E circa 1994

- Fletcher FU-24 – (1954) Single-engine two-seat (side-by-side) low-wing with fixed landing gear. Piston-engined aerial-application aircraft
- AESL Airtourer – (1961) Single-engined light utility aircraft.
- PAC CT/4 Airtrainer – (1972) Single-engine two-seat (side-by-side) low-wing with fixed landing gear. Piston-engined military basic trainer
- PAC Cresco – (early 1980s) Single-engine low-wing with fixed landing gear. Turboprop-engined aerial application aircraft
- P-750 XSTOL – (2001) Single-engine low-wing passenger transport with fixed landing gear. Turboprop skydive/utility/aerial application aircraft. Formerly known as the PAC 750-XL.
- E-350 Expedition – (2019) Single-engine high-wing five-seat STOL aircraft that first flew in December 2019
- SuperPac 750XL-II XSTOL – new 900hp 750XL version with increased performance and lower fuel burn
