= PAC Cresco =

New Zealand agricultural aircraft

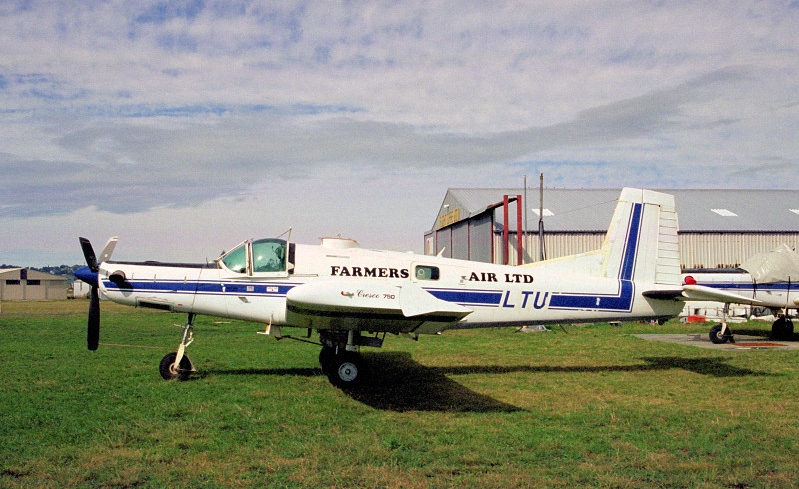

General information
- Type: Turboprop agricultural aircraft
- Manufacturer: Pacific Aerospace Corporation.
- Status: In service
- Number built: 40

History
- Manufactured: 1979-2003, 2019-present
- Introduction date: 1979
- First flight: 28 February 1979
- Developed from: Fletcher FU-24
- Developed into: PAC P-750 XSTOL

The PAC Cresco is a turboprop-powered derivative of the Fletcher FU-24 (later called the PAC Fletcher) aerial topdressing aircraft, manufactured by the Pacific Aerospace Corporation in Hamilton, New Zealand. The Cresco was superseded by the PAC P-750 XSTOL in the early 21st century, but in 2019 was returned to production with the first new aircraft being completed 3 December 2020.

== Design and development ==
The Cresco is a low-wing monoplane which, like the Fletcher but unlike most topdressers, has tricycle undercarriage and places the cabin forward of the hopper, at the leading edge of the wing - which gives the pilot of the Cresco a good field of vision. The high-lift wing has pronounced dihedral on the outer span. The prototype Cresco (ZK-LTP) had an all-moving tailplane, but was lost when the tailplane separated in flight, (the pilot parachuting to safety). Subsequent aircraft have had conventional tails.

Sales of the Cresco were not as impressive as those of the piston-engine powered Fletcher, with only 39 examples being built before production was terminated. The Cresco has been sold in several countries and has pioneered new utility roles not explored by the Fletcher. Although used primarily to spread superphosphate fertiliser, the Cresco is also used in the utility role, especially as a skydiving platform, where its fast rate of climb (1,560 ft/min, 7.9 m/s) has made it popular, and as a firefighting water bomber, a role it can perform with little alteration from its standard agricultural layout. One aircraft has been converted for aeromagnetic survey. A disadvantage in the utility role is the low internal volume available for the relatively high-powered engine.

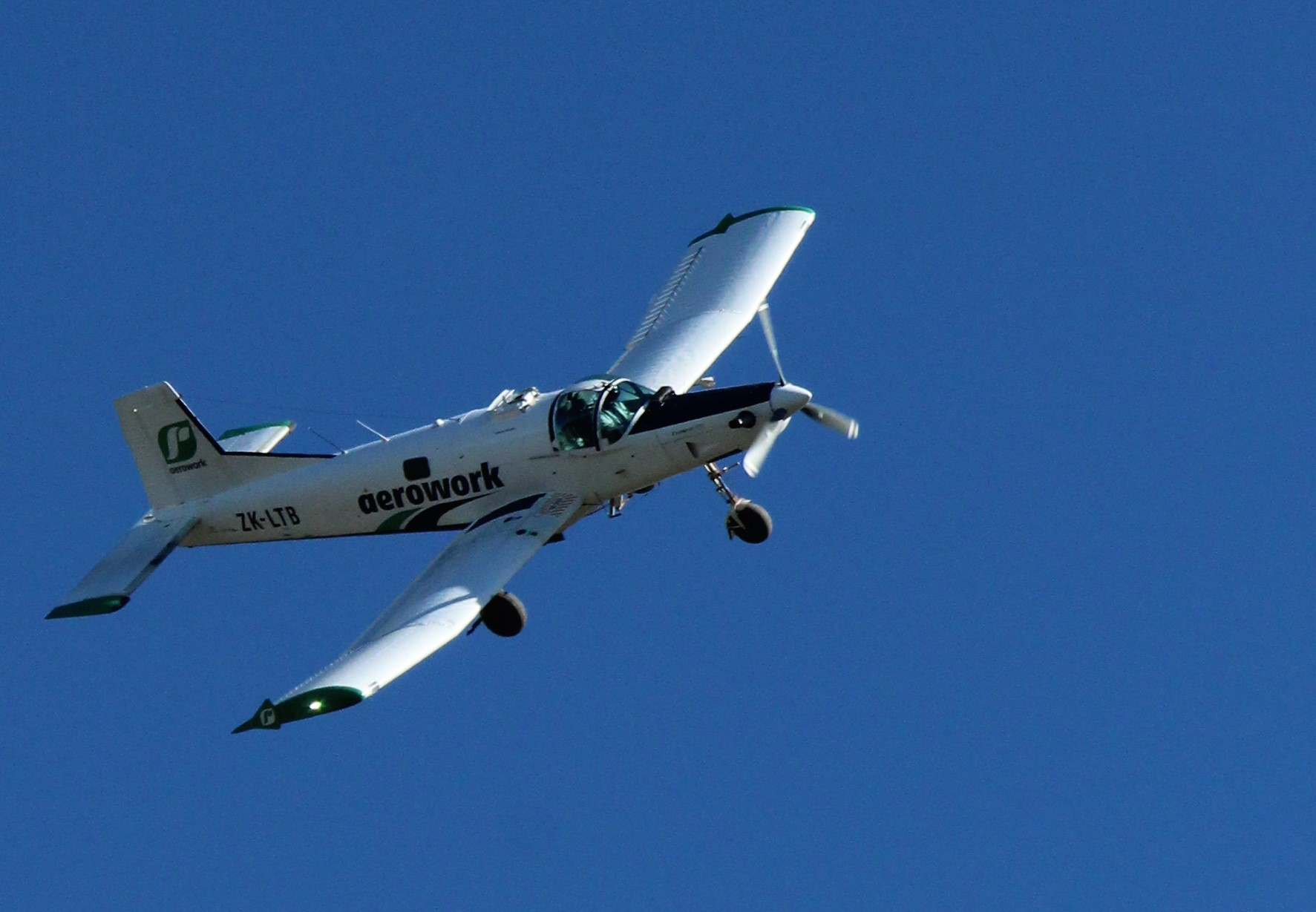
PAC Cresco in flight in topdressing duty

The Cresco is normally flown by a single pilot, but has a second seat in all versions. It can carry nine sky divers. Usual powerplant is a 750 hp (560 kW) Pratt & Whitney Canada PT6-34AG.

The PAC 750XL, a utility aircraft was derived from the Cresco, and retains its high-lift wing. As of January 2019 120 PAC 750XL's have been produced and it remains in high demand as an uncompromising utility aircraft able to operate in hot and high conditions.

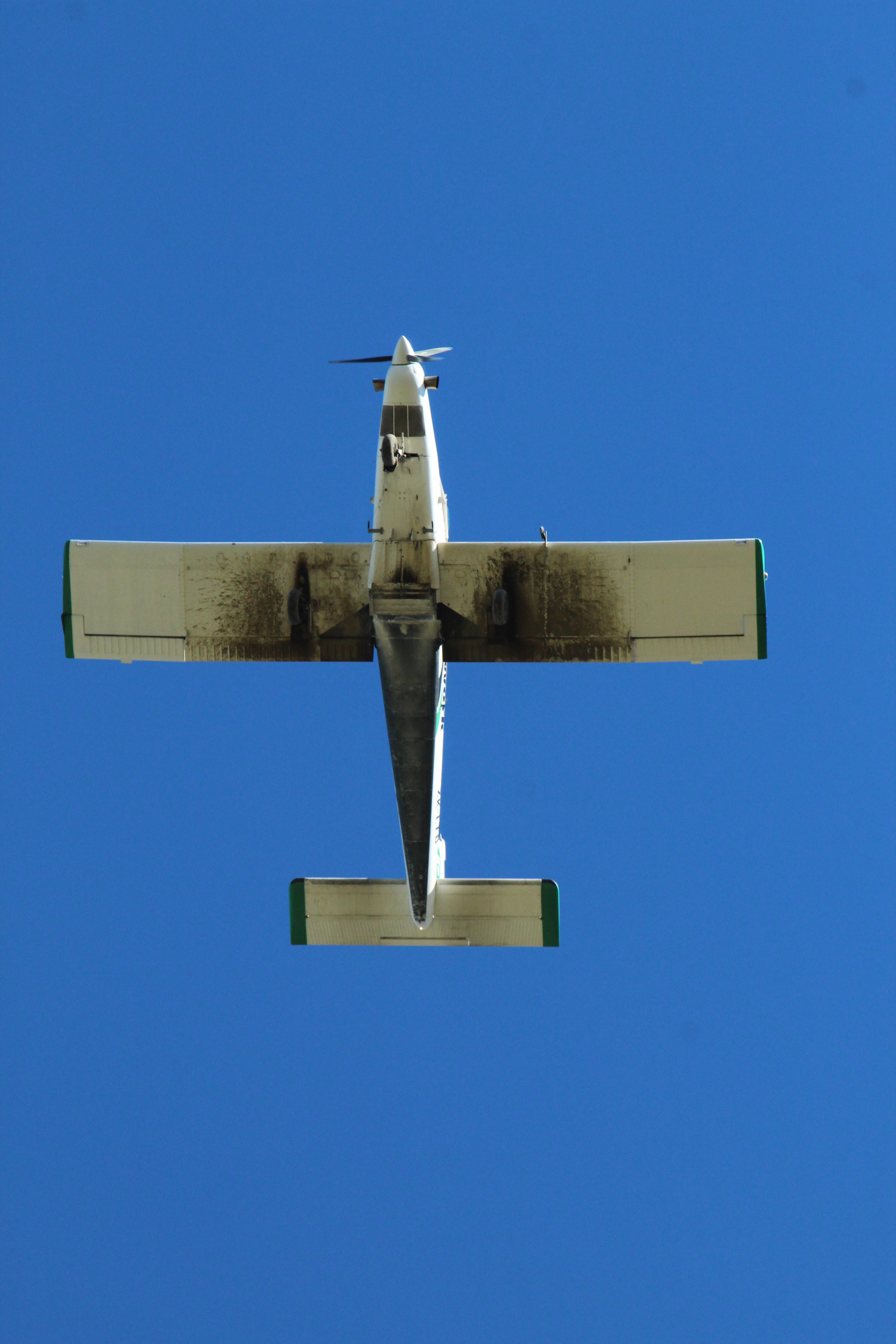
Underside plan view of PAC Cresco, during topdressing work.

== Cresco II ==
On 17 December 2019 Pacific Aerospace posted on Facebook an announcement by CEO Mark Crouch that the type would return to production as the Cresco II, with some modifications regarding pilot safety and comfort, for the New Zealand customer Rural Air Work Ltd.

== Variants ==
Cresco 08-600
Initial production version, powered by 447 kW (600 shp) Lycoming LTP 101-700A-1A engine.
Cresco 08-750
More powerful version with 559 kW (750 shp) Pratt & Whitney PT6A-34AG engine. Production from 1992.
Cresco II
Improved cockpit sealing and air conditioning, more use of P-750 components, a carbon fiber engine cowl, and an EFIS avionics setup. Production from 2019.

== Specifications (Cresco 08-600) ==
Data from Jane's All the World's Aircraft 1988-89

General characteristics

- Crew: 2
- Capacity:
  - Up to seven passengers (utility configuration) or
  - 1,779 L (391 imp gal; 470 US gal) liquid chemicals or
  - 1,860 kg (4,100 lb) dry chemicals
- Length: 11.07 m (36 ft 4 in)
- Wingspan: 12.81 m (42 ft 0 in)
- Height: 3.63 m (11 ft 11 in)
- Wing area: 27.31 m^{2} (294.0 sq ft)
- Empty weight: 1,270 kg (2,800 lb)
- Max takeoff weight: 3,175 kg (7,000 lb) (agricultural)
- Fuel capacity: 545.5 L (120 imp gal; 144 US gal)
- Powerplant: 1 × Lycoming LTP101-700A-1-A turboprop, 450 kW (600 shp)
- Propellers: 3-bladed Hartzell HC-B2TN-3D/T10282 constant-speed propeller, 2.59 m (8 ft 6 in) diameter

Performance

- Maximum speed: 274 km/h (170 mph, 148 kn) at sea level
- Cruise speed: 250 km/h (160 mph, 130 kn) (75% power)
- Stall speed: 97 km/h (60 mph, 52 kn) (flaps down, power off)
- Never exceed speed: 328 km/h (204 mph, 177 kn)
- Range: 852 km (529 mi, 460 nmi)
- Service ceiling: 5,500 m (18,000 ft) (absolute ceiling)
- Rate of climb: 6.32 m/s (1,245 ft/min)
- Take-off run to 15 m (50 ft): 436 m (1,430 ft)
- Landing run from 15 m (50 ft): 500 m (1,640 ft)

== See also ==
Related development

- Fletcher FU-24
- PAC P-750 XSTOL
