= Lycoming LTS101 =

Turboshaft engine family

LTS101 / LTP101
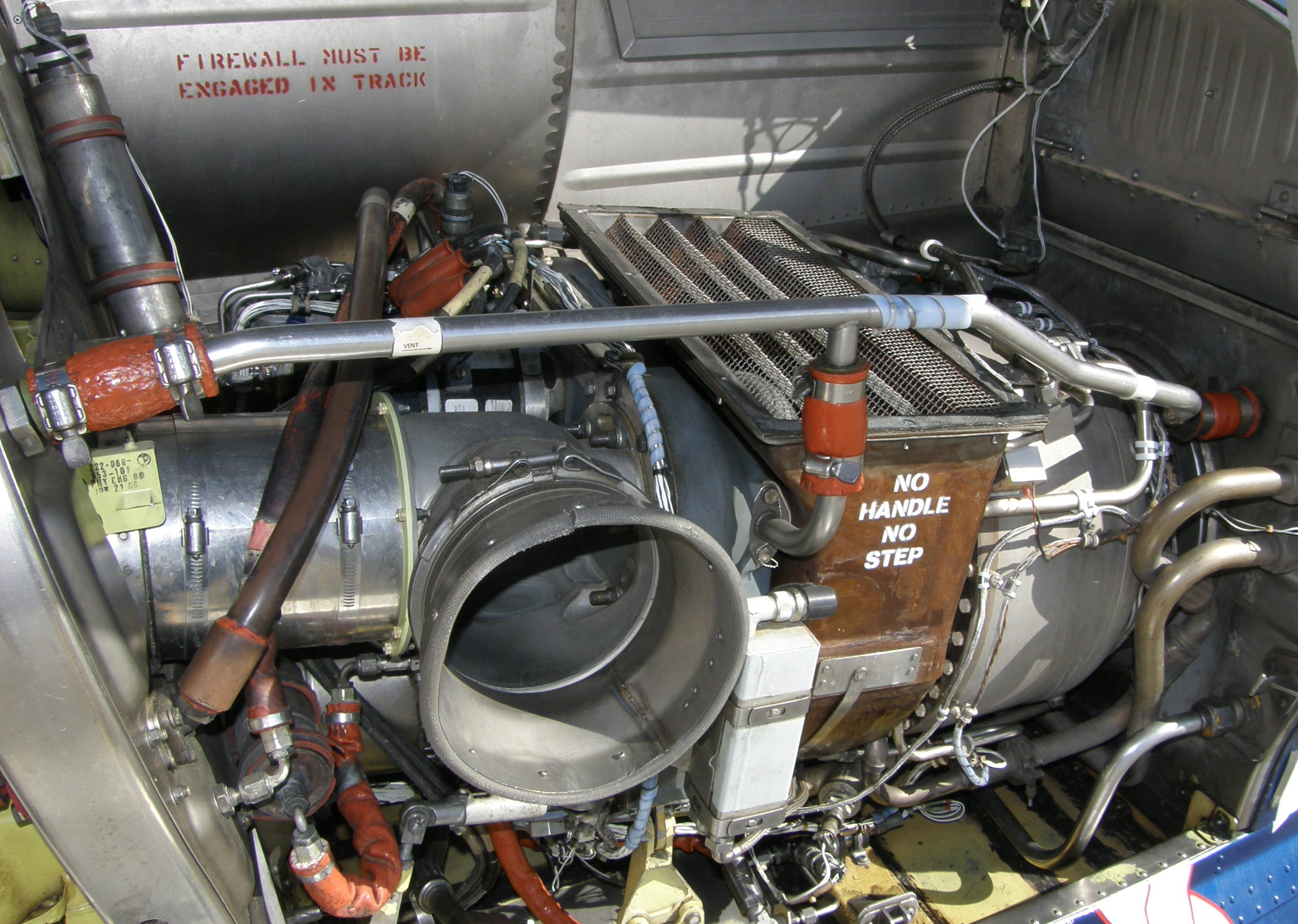
- LTS101-750C engine installation (left engine) in a Bell 222UT
- Type: Turboprop / turboshaft
- National origin: United States
- Manufacturer: Lycoming Engines; Honeywell Aerospace; Intermountain Turbine Services, Inc.
- First run: 1960
- Major applications: Aérospatiale HH-65 Dolphin; MBB/Kawasaki BK 117; Bell 222; Eurocopter AS350 AStar

The Lycoming (now Honeywell) LTS101 is a turboshaft engine family ranging from 650 to 850 shaft horsepower, used in a number of popular helicopters, and, as the LTP101 turboprop, light aircraft. Both models carry the US military designation T702. The engine was originally designed at the Lycoming Turbine Engine Division in Stratford, Connecticut, but is now produced by Honeywell Aerospace.

== Variants ==
LTP101-600
LTP101-700
LTS101-600A-2
LTS101-600A-3
LTS101-600A-3A
LTS101-650B-1
LTS101-650B-1A
LTS101-650C-2
LTS101-650C-3
LTS101-650C-3A
LTS101-700D-2
LTS101-750A-1
LTS101-750B-2
LTS101-750C-1
LTS101-850B-2
T702

== Applications ==
- Aérospatiale HH-65A/B Dolphin
- Air Tractor AT-302
- Bell 222
- Cessna 421C Golden Eagle (turbine conversion)
- EcoJet concept car built under the direction of General Motors
- Eurocopter AS350 AStar
- MBB/Kawasaki BK 117
- PAC Cresco
- Piaggio P166
- High Survivability Test Vehicle (Light) (AAI proposal)

== Specifications (LTS101-650C-3/3A) ==
Data from

==== General characteristics ====
- Type: Turboshaft
- Length: 31 in (78 cm)
- Diameter: 23 in (58 cm)
- Dry weight: 241 lb (109 kg)

==== Components ====
- Compressor: 1 stage low pressure axial compressor, 1 stage high pressure centrifugal compressor
- Combustors: Annular
- Turbine: 1 stage high pressure turbine, 1 stage low pressure turbine

==== Performance ====
- Maximum power output: 675 shp (503 kW)
- Overall pressure ratio: 8.4:1
- Specific fuel consumption: 0.57 lb/(lbf h)
- Power-to-weight ratio: 2.8:1 hp/lb

== See also ==
Related development

- Honeywell HTS900

Comparable engines

- Allison Model 250

Related lists

- List of aircraft engines
