= Fletcher FU-24 =

1954 agricultural aircraft family

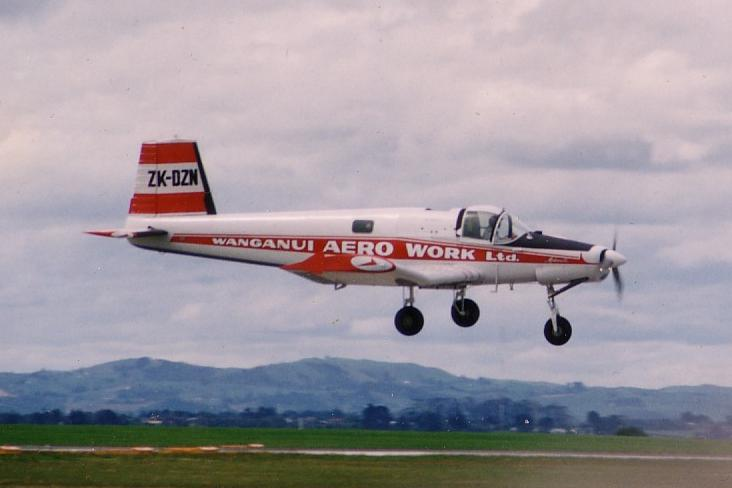
- Fletcher FU-24 in Wanganui Aero Work colours

General information
- Type: Agricultural aircraft
- National origin: United States / New Zealand
- Manufacturer: Fletcher Aviation; Pacific Aerospace
- Designer: John Thorp
- Status: In active service
- Number built: 297

History
- Introduction date: 1954
- First flight: 14 June 1954
- Developed into: PAC Cresco

The Fletcher FU-24 is an agricultural aircraft made in New Zealand. Being one of the first aircraft designed for aerial topdressing, the Fletcher has also been used for other aerial applications as a utility aircraft, and for sky diving.

== Design and development ==
In the early 1950s New Zealand topdressing operators were in the U.S. seeking a replacement for war surplus de Havilland Tiger Moths which formed the backbone of the industry. To answer the New Zealand request US aeronautical engineer and light aircraft enthusiast John W. Thorp, working for the Fletcher Aviation Corporation, conceived the T.15 with design elements taken from his earlier T.11 Sky Scooter including an all-moving horizontal tailplane but with a wing design similar to that of his Fletcher FD-25 Defender. Further design work was carried out by Gerald Barden of the Fletcher Aviation Corporation under Thorp's direction. A group of New Zealand top dressing operators gathered a hundred purchase options for the design, now marketed as the Fletcher FU-24, off the drawing board and New Zealand farming company Cable Price Corporation funded the construction of two prototypes (one for static stress tests which never received a constructor's number and the second, c/n1, to fly) in the U.S. with the New Zealand Meat Producers Board acting as financial guarantor.

The Fletcher is a conventional low-wing monoplane with tricycle undercarriage, side-by-side seating in front of the wing and hopper and pronounced dihedral on the outer wing panels. A door aft of the wing's trailing edge on the port side allows access to a cargo compartment. The Fletcher's airframe is constructed entirely of aluminium, heavily treated to prevent corrosion.

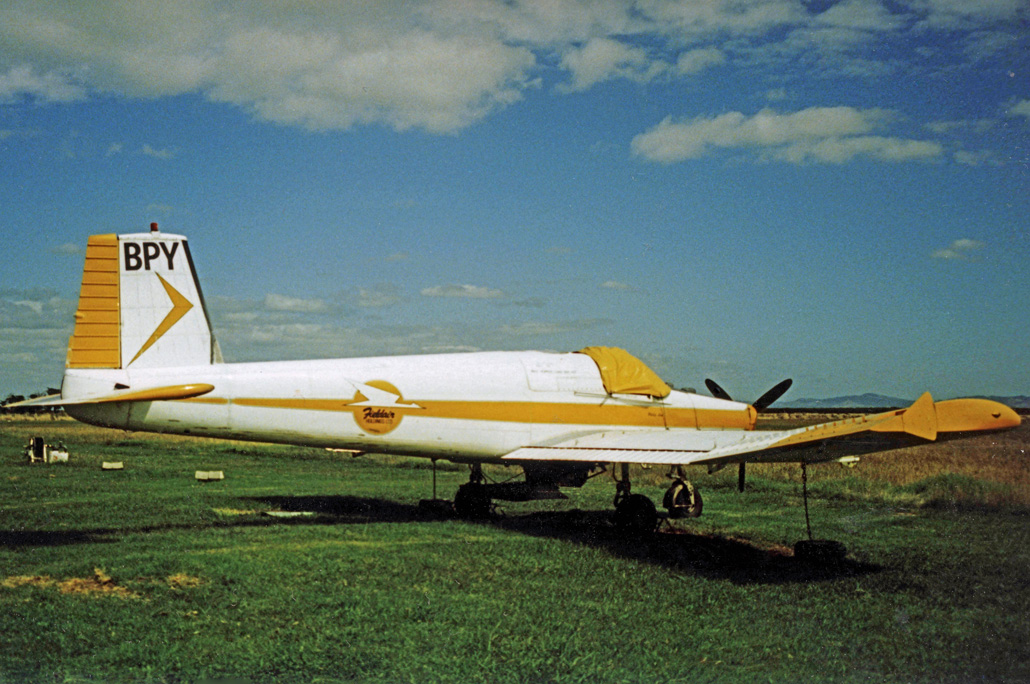
Fletcher FU-24-950M of Fieldair at Thames airfield New Zealand in 1992

FU-24 c/n1 flew on 14 June 1954 in the United States as N6505C, then was disassembled for shipment to New Zealand where it flew as ZK-BDS. This original prototype had a 225 hp (168 kW) engine and open cockpit. Prior to production commencing the design was altered to add an enclosed cockpit and more powerful 260 to 310 hp (230 kW) Continental engines.

The next 70 aircraft were delivered to New Zealand in kit form and assembled at Hamilton airport by operator James Aviation and later at Tasman Empire Airways Limited's Mechanics Bay factory under contract from a new firm, Air Parts (NZ) Limited. From 1961 full production was undertaken locally by Air Parts which later became part of AESL. It was during Air Parts' production that detail improvements and the option of dual controls were added, becoming the FU-24 Mark II.

After the 257th aircraft the engine was changed to a 400 hp (300 kW) Lycoming IO-720 horizontally opposed eight-cylinder engine (over a hundred earlier aircraft were re-built and re-engined by the factory). In 1967 a PT6 turboprop version was built by James Aviation as ZK-CTZ, a 530 hp (400 kW) Garrett TPE 331-powered version followed in 1968 and a 665 hp (496 kW) Garrett-powered version in 1971, both for Robertson Air Service. Several others were converted aftermarket with these or Walter turbines, (including the first prototype, which flew until recently with a Walter). Two aircraft were also converted to Garrett TPE 331-10 engines by the Scone (NSW Australia) operator Airpasture. These aircraft have since flown many thousands of hours without incident.

In the mid 1990s operator Fieldair experimented with a turbocharged small block Chevrolet 402 V-8 producing 550 hp, although the project was cancelled before it flew, and in the early 2000s Super Air flew a Fletcher powered by a 550 hp Ford V-8 diesel which was replaced by a Walter turbine after trials were completed. In 2018 another Fletcher was fitted with a RED A03/V12 diesel engine and trials are ongoing as of 2022.

At least nineteen different engines have been fitted to the Fletcher.

In the mid 1970s, Pacific Aerospace decided the Fletcher design was reaching the limits of redevelopment and introduced the larger and stronger PAC Cresco. Despite the similar appearance this is a new aircraft, though sharing a few components. For several years production of the two continued side by side, but the type is now effectively out of production, (new Fletchers remain nominally available from the manufacturer, but no new aircraft have been built since a batch of five for Syria was completed in 1992).

Although Fletcher was the name of the manufacturer in the U.S. and the aircraft was called the FU-24, over time the type has become colloquially known as the Fletcher.

Fletchers have been sold to most parts of the world, although they are rare in Europe and the US. Government orders came from many developing countries including Iraq, Sudan, Syria Thailand and Pakistan.

== Variants ==
- FU-24 : Single-seat agricultural top dressing aircraft.
- FU-24A Utility : Six-seat utility transport aircraft. One prototype built in the United States.
- FU-24-1060 : James Aviation turbine conversion with a 500 hp Pratt & Whitney Canada PT6A-20. One built.
- FU-24-1160 : Robertson Air Service turbine conversion with a 530 hp Garrett TPE331-57A. One built.
- FU-24-1284 : Robertson Air Service turbine conversion with a 665 hp Garrett TPE331-101A. One built.
- FU-24-950 : Two-seat agricultural top dressing aircraft. Also known as the Task Master in the United States.
- FU-24-954 : Improved version of the -954.
- Pegasus 1 : proposed military version developed by Frontier Aerospace, of Long Beach, California, not built.
- Fletcher Falcon : Wanganui Aero Work conversion with Lycoming LTP101 engine and Cresco wing and main landing gear. One built.
- Fletcher FU24-550GT Crusader : Flight Care of Napier conversion fitted with 550 hp Pratt & Whitney PT6A-15AG. One built.

== Operators ==
New Zealand

- Mount Cook Airline

== Aircraft on display ==
Three examples are held by aviation museums in New Zealand:

- c/n 72 ZK-BWV is under restoration by the Gisborne Aviation Preservation Society for display in the Tairāwhiti Aviation Museum, after having been used as a gate guardian for several years at Gisborne Airport
- c/n 124 ZK-CRY is on display at Classic Flyers NZ in Tauranga painted as ZK-BDS
- c/n 1001 ZK-CTZ, the first turbine-powered Fletcher, is on display at the Museum of Transport and Technology in Auckland

== Specifications (FU-24-954) ==
Data from Jane's All The World's Aircraft 1993–94

General characteristics

- Crew: two
- Capacity:
  - Six passengers or
  - 320 US gal (1,200 L; 270 imp gal) liquid or 2,350 lb (1,070 kg) powder hopper
- Length: 31 ft 10 in (9.70 m)
- Wingspan: 42 ft 0 in (12.80 m)
- Height: 9 ft 4 in (2.84 m)
- Wing area: 294.0 sq ft (27.31 m^{2})
- Airfoil: NACA 4415
- Empty weight: 2,620 lb (1,188 kg)
- Gross weight: 4,860 lb (2,204 kg) normal maximum
- Max takeoff weight: 5,430 lb (2,463 kg) agricultural
- Fuel capacity: 67 US gal (56 imp gal, 254 L)
- Powerplant: 1 × Textron Lycoming IO-720-A1A air-cooled flat-eight engine, 400 hp (300 kW)

Performance

- Maximum speed: 145 mph (233 km/h, 126 kn) at sea level
- Cruise speed: 130 mph (210 km/h, 110 kn) 75% power
- Stall speed: 57 mph (92 km/h, 50 kn) flaps down
- Never exceed speed: 165 mph (266 km/h, 143 kn)
- Range: 441 mi (710 km, 383 nmi)
- Service ceiling: 16,000 ft (4,900 m)
- Rate of climb: 805 ft/min (4.09 m/s)

== See also ==
- Aerial application

Related development

- Fletcher FD-25
- PAC Cresco
- Thorp T.11 Sky Scooter

Aircraft of comparable role, configuration, and era

- Auster Agricola
