= Sikorsky S-72 =

US experimental compound helicopter (hybrid helicopter/fixed-wing aircraft)

S-72 RSRA
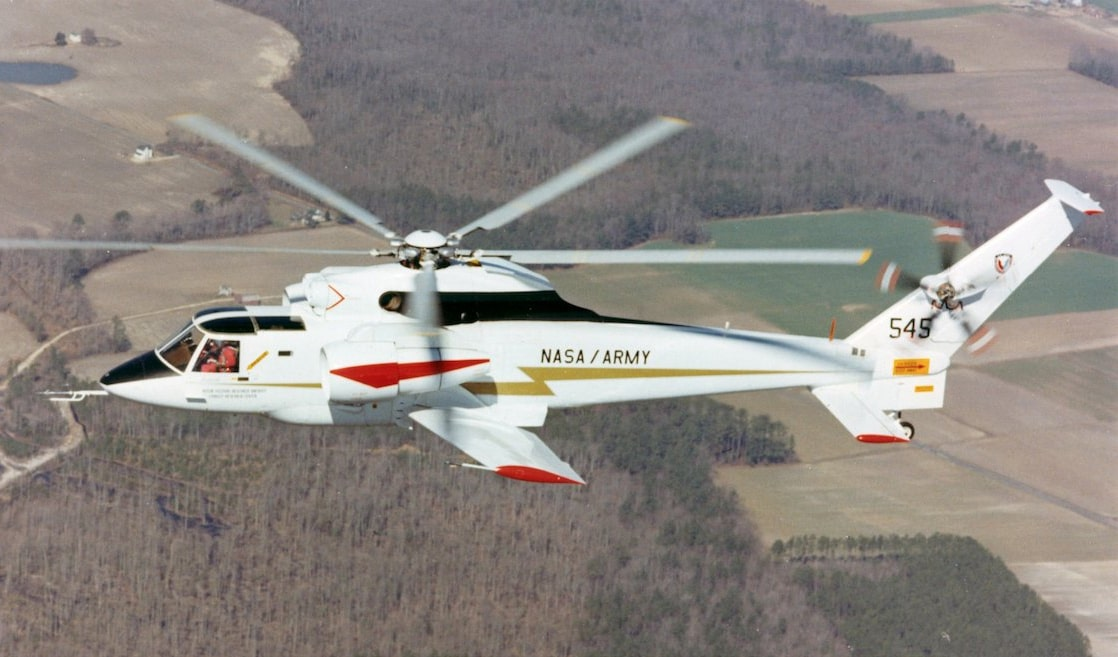
- The S-72 in flight with a main rotor

General information
- Type: Experimental compound helicopter
- Manufacturer: Sikorsky Aircraft
- Number built: 2

History
- First flight: 12 October 1976

The Sikorsky S-72 was an experimental Sikorsky Aircraft compound helicopter developed as the Rotor Systems Research Aircraft (RSRA) for the National Aeronautics and Space Administration (NASA) and the United States Army. The RSRA was a testbed for rotor and propulsion systems for high-speed.

== Design and development ==
=== RSRA ===
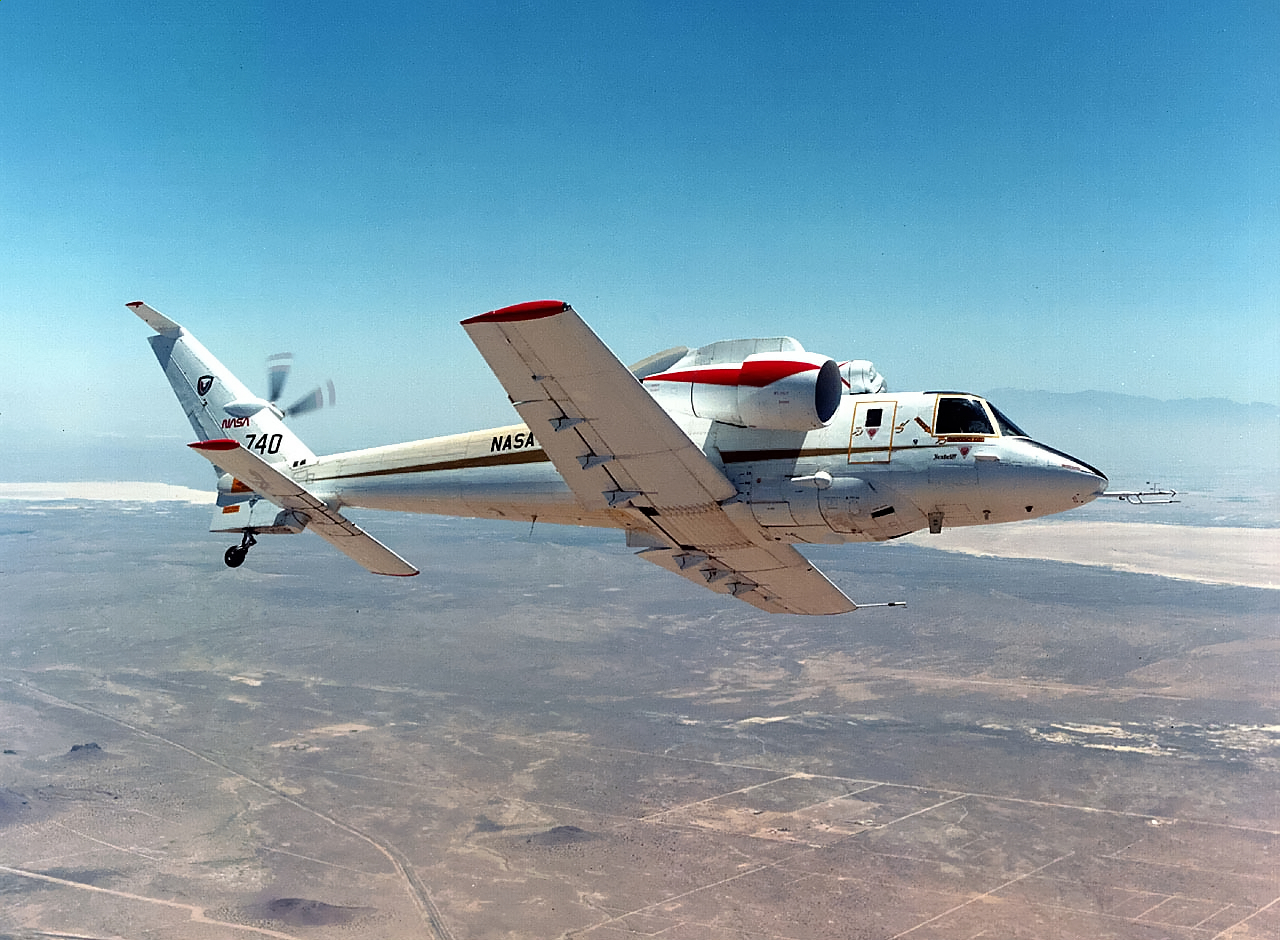
The S-72 in flight without a main rotor in 1984

Sikorsky and Bell Helicopters competed for the RSRA contract. Bell's preferred proposal was the "Bell 646A" with rotors based on the Bell 240 UTTAS; the alternative was the smaller "Bell 646B" based on the Bell 309 KingCobra. Sikorsky proposed either a new aircraft or a modified Sikorsky S-67 Blackhawk with the rotor and gearbox from the Sikorsky S-61. Sikorsky won the contract for two aircraft in January 1974. The modified S-67 became the S-72.

The S-72 could be fitted with wings and General Electric TF34 turbofans to allow compound helicopter configurations to be experimentally investigated at speeds up to 300 knots (560 km/h; 350 mph). In addition, it could fly as a fixed-wing aircraft without a main rotor.

Unique among helicopters of its time, it was fitted with a crew emergency extraction system. This system, when activated, fired explosive bolts that severed the main rotor blades, escape panels were blown off the roof of the aircraft. The crew was then extracted using rockets, rather than by a traditional ejection seat as on fixed-wing aircraft.

The RSRA was a pure research aircraft developed to fill the void between design analysis, wind tunnel testing, and flight results of rotor aircraft. The joint NASA/Army project began in December 1970, with first flight on October 12, 1976. The first of two aircraft arrived from Sikorsky to NASA on February 11, 1979. One notable test performed with the RSRA was the use of the main and tail rotor load measurement system to determine the vertical drag of the airframe.

In 1981, NASA and the US Army solicited proposals for fitting a four-bladed main rotor to the RSRA. Sikorsky proposed fitting a UH-60A main rotor to the RSRA in their proposal, while Hughes Helicopters proposed fitting a YAH-64A main rotor, and Boeing Vertol proposed fitting a YUH-61A or BV-347 main rotor. In the end, this program did not proceed.

=== X-Wing ===
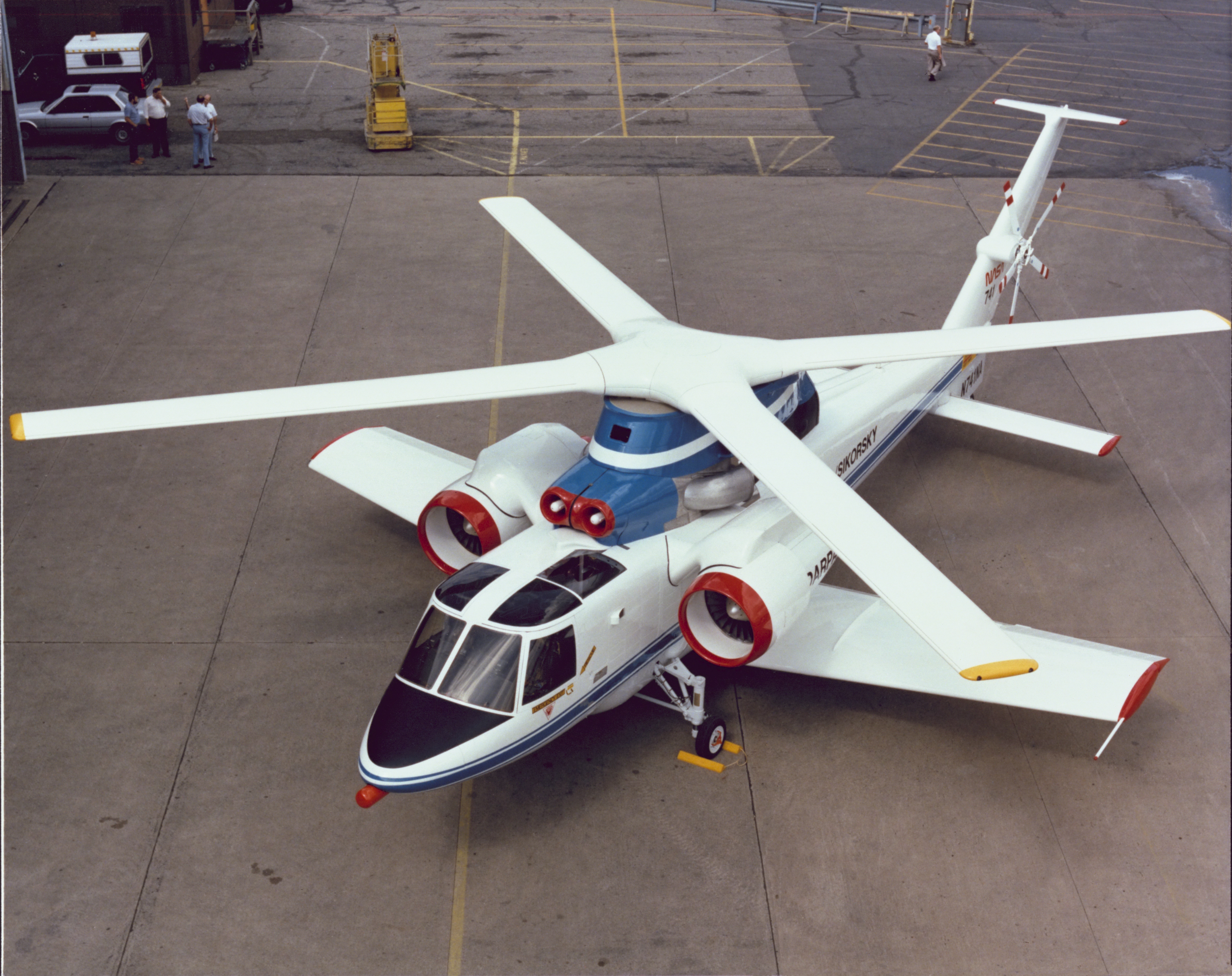
Sikorsky S-72 modified as the X-Wing testbed

The X-Wing Circulation Control Rotor Concept was developed in the mid-1970s by the David W. Taylor Naval Ship Research and Development Center under DARPA funding. In October 1976, Lockheed Corporation won a DARPA contract to develop a large-scale rotor to test the concept.

The X-Wing was conceived to complement rather than replace helicopters and fixed-wing aircraft. The X-Wing was intended to be used in roles such as air-to-air and air-to-ground operations, as well as airborne early warning, search and rescue and anti-submarine warfare. These roles could take advantage of the aircraft's ability to hover and maneuver at low speeds and to cruise at high speeds.

Intended to take off vertically like a helicopter, the craft's rigid rotors could be stopped in mid-flight to act as X-shaped wings to provide additional lift during forward flight, as well as having more conventional wings. Instead of controlling lift by altering the angle of attack of its blades as more conventional helicopters do, the craft used compressed air fed from the engines and expelled from its blades to generate a virtual wing surface, similar to blown flaps on a conventional platform. Computerized valves made sure the compressed air came from the correct edge of the rotor, the correct edge changing as the rotor rotated.

In late 1983, Sikorsky received a contract to modify one S-72 RSRA into a demonstration testbed for the X-Wing rotor system. The modified airframe was rolled out in 1986. While many of the aircraft's technical issues had been resolved, with plans for it to begin flight tests with the rotor/wing system, it never flew. Budgetary requirements led to the program being canceled in 1988.

== Specifications (S-72) ==
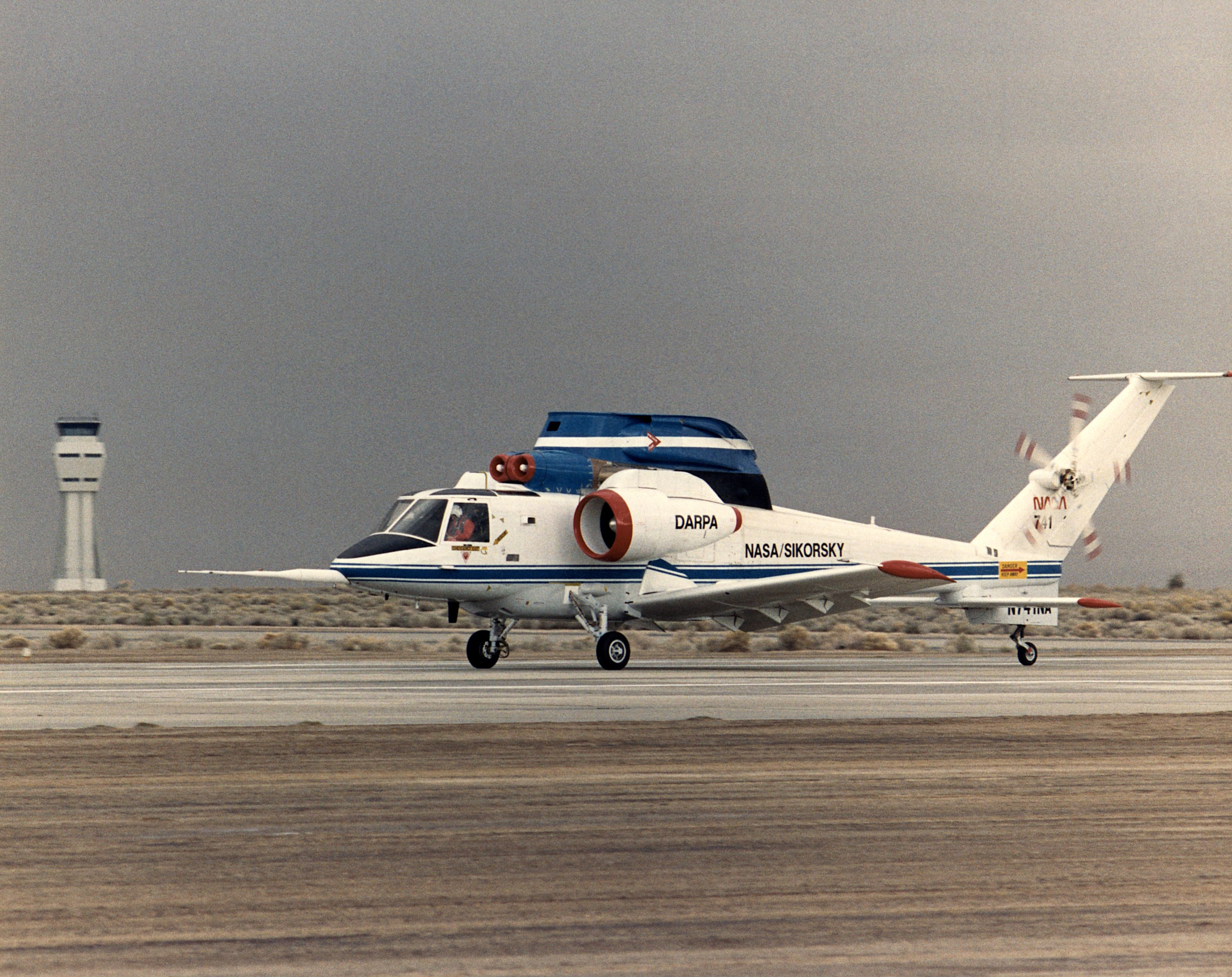
Rotor Systems Research Aircraft / X-Wing aircraft during a 1987 high speed taxi test

Data from Jane's all the World's Aircraft 1977–78

General characteristics

- Crew: 3
- Length: 70 ft 7 in (21.51 m)
- Wingspan: 45 ft 1 in (13.74 m)
- Height: 14 ft 6 in (4.42 m) to top of rotor hub
- Wing area: 370 sq ft (34 m^{2})
- Airfoil: NACA 63-415
- Empty weight: 21,022 lb (9,535 kg) (compound helicopter configuration)
- Gross weight: 26,200 lb (11,884 kg) (compound helicopter configuration)
- Powerplant: 2 × General Electric T58-GE-5 turboshaft, 1,400 shp (1,000 kW) each
- Powerplant: 2 × General Electric TF34-GE-400A turbofan, 9,275 lbf (41.26 kN) thrust each
- Main rotor diameter: 62 ft 0 in (18.9 m)
- Main rotor area: 3,019 sq ft (280.5 m^{2})

Performance

- Maximum speed: 300 kn (350 mph, 560 km/h)

== See also ==
Related development

- Sikorsky SH-3 Sea King – American anti-submarine helicopter/Sikorsky S-61 – Series of civil transport helicopters

Aircraft of comparable role, configuration, and era

- Boeing X-50 Dragonfly – US experimental drone aircraft
- Sikorsky S-69 – US experimental co-axial compound helicopter
- Sikorsky XV-2 – American VTOL aircraft proposal

Related lists

- List of rotorcraft
