= List of United States attack aircraft =

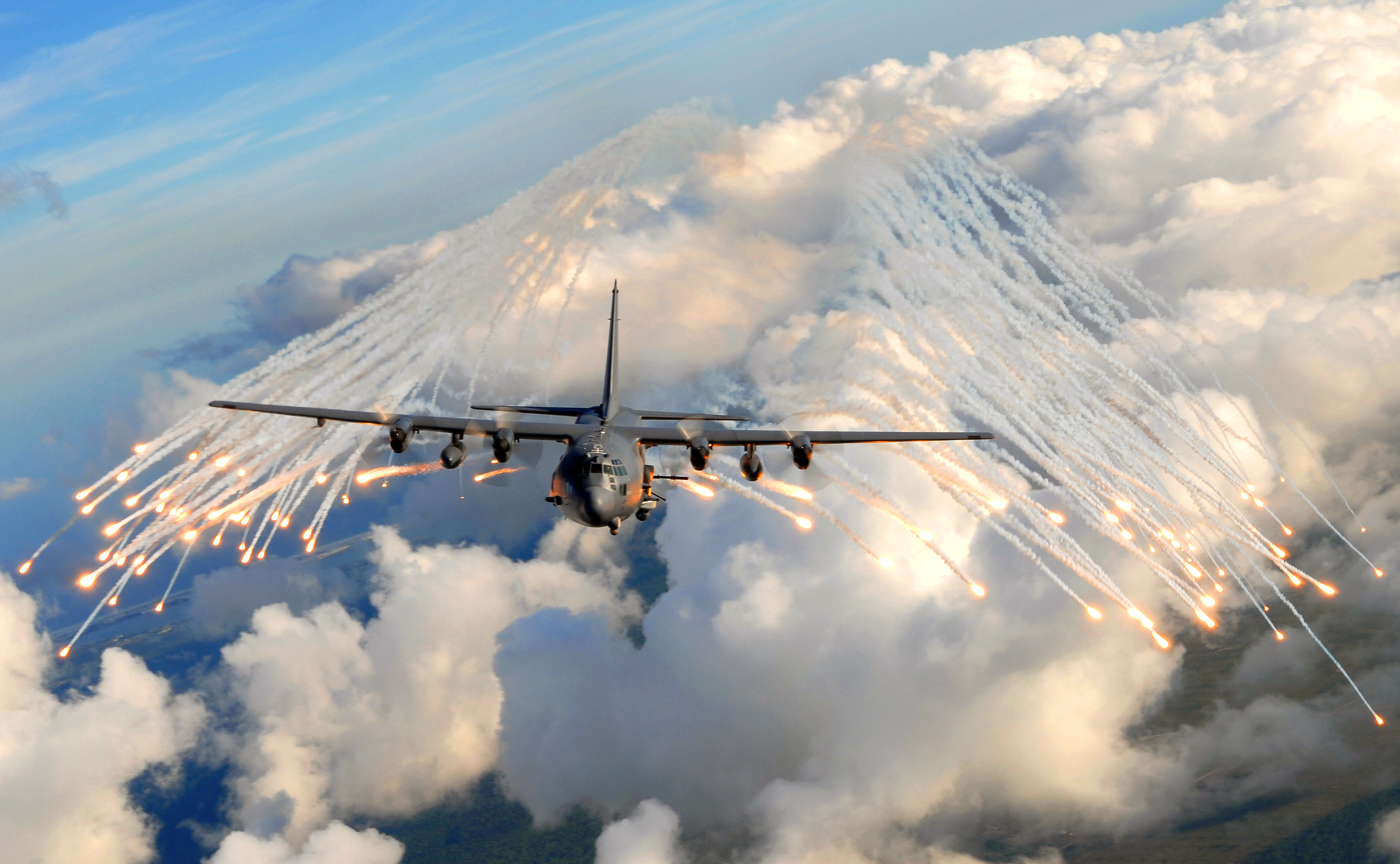
An AC-130U "Spooky", a type of attack aircraft, over Hulburt Field

This is a list of United States-used attack aircraft, which typically perform tactical bombing and close air support against ground targets.

== 1924-1962 ==
Name	Role	Manufacturer	Image	Notes	Year of first flight	Introduction	Number built
Douglas XA-2		Douglas Aircraft Company		Converted from a Douglas O-2 in 1926.		N/A	1
Curtiss Falcon		Curtiss Aeroplane and Motor Company		Family of observation and attack aircraft; composes of the A-3, the main attack version, XA-4, and A-5 and A-6 with more powerful engines.			
Fokker XA-7		Fokker-America			1931		1
Curtiss A-8		Curtiss Aeroplane and Motor Company			1931	1932	13
Lockheed Y1A-9		Detroit Lockheed		A version of the Lockheed YP-24 that specialized in ground attack.	1931		1
Curtiss YA-10 Shrike		Curtiss/Curtiss-Wright			1932	1933	2
Consolidated A-11		Consolidated Aircraft		Production attack version of the Consolidated P-30 fighters.			
Curtiss A-12 Shrike		Curtiss				1933	46
Northrop YA-13/XA-16		Northrop		Attack version of the Northrop Gamma. A single example was built as a prototype. It was also known as XA-16 after an engine refit.	Never	N/A	1
Curtiss XA-14		Curtiss Aeroplane and Motor Company			1935		1
Martin A-15		Glenn L. Martin Company		Proposed attack variant of the Martin B-10; contract fell to the Curtiss XA-14.	Never	N/A	0
Northrop A-17 / Nomad		Northrop				1935	411
Curtiss A-18 Shrike		Curtiss Aeroplane and Motor Company		Developed from the Curtiss XA-14.	1935	N/A	13
Douglas A-20 Havoc	Medium bomber; Attack aircraft; Night fighter	Douglas Aircraft Company			1938	1941	7,478
Stearman XA-21		Stearman Aircraft			1938	N/A	1
North American NA-40	Attack bomber			Developed from the North American XB-21 and into the North American B-25 Mitchell.	1939	N/A	1
Douglas SBD Dauntless / A-24 Banshee	Dive bomber	Douglas Aircraft			Unknown	Unknown	~953
Curtiss SB2C Helldiver / A-25 Shrike	Dive bomber	Curtiss-Wright			1940	1942	7,140
Martin A-30 Baltimore	Light bomber /reconnaissance	Glenn L. Martin Company			1941	1941	1,575
Douglas A-33				Developed from the Northrop A-17	Unknown	1941	36
Vultee A-31 / A-35 Vengeance	Dive bomber	Vultee Aircraft			1941	Unknown	1,931
North American A-36	Ground attack/dive bomber	North American Aviation		Developed from the North American P-51 Mustang.	1942	1942	500
Douglas A-26 Invader	Ground attack Light bomber	Douglas Aircraft Company		Originally designed A-26, then designated B-26 between 1948 and 1965 after the Martin B-26 Marauder was retired, then redesignated to A-26.	1942	1944	2,503
Brewster XA-32		Brewster Aeronautical Corporation			1943	N/A	2
Beechcraft XA-38 Grizzly		Beechcraft			1944	N/A	2
Vultee XA-41	Ground attack	Vultee Aircraft			1944	N/A	1
Curtiss XBTC / A-40	Torpedo/dive bomber	Curtiss Aeroplane and Motor Company			1945	N/A	2
Convair XA-44 / XB-53		Convair		Project cancelled before two prototypes were built	N/A	N/A	0
Douglas A-1 (AD) Skyraider		Douglas Aircraft Company		Formerly designated AD before the 1962 unification of Navy and Air Force designations; served during the Korean War and Vietnam War; had an unusually long career.	1945	1946	3,180
North American A-2 (AJ) Savage	Medium bomber	North American Aviation		Formerly designated AJ prior to the 1962 unification of Navy and Air Force designations.	1948	1950	143
Vought F7U Cutlass	Naval multirole fighter	Chance Vought			1948	1951	320
Douglas A2D Skyshark	Prototype carrier-based attack aircraft	Douglas Aircraft Company			1950	N/A	12
Douglas A-3 (A3D) Skywarrior	Carrier-based strategic bomber	Douglas Aircraft Company		Largest aircraft regularly operated from aircraft carriers.	1952	1956	282
Douglas A-4 (A4D) Skyhawk	Attack aircraft, fighter, aggressor aircraft	Douglas Aircraft Company / McDonnell Douglas			1954	1956	2,960
North American A-5 (A3J) Vigilante	Carrier-based nuclear bomber /reconnaissance aircraft	North American Aviation			1958	1961	167
Grumman A-6 Intruder	Attack aircraft	Grumman			1960	1963	693

== 1962 - Present ==
Name	Role	Manufacturer	Image	Notes	Year of first flight	Introduction	Number built
Douglas AC-47 Spooky	Ground-attack aircraft and close air support gunship	Douglas Aircraft Company		Developed from the Douglas C-47 Skytrain, it itself developed from the acclaimed Douglas DC-3. Succeeded by the Fairchild AC-119 & the Lockheed AC-130. First deployed over Vietnam in 1964.	1964	1965	53
Bell AH-1 Cobra	Attack helicopter	Bell Helicopter		Developed from the UH-1 Iroquois/ "Huey." World's first dedicated armed attack helicopter.	1965	1967	1,116
LTV A-7 Corsair II		Ling-Temco-Vought		Replacement for the Douglas A-4 Skyhawk. Its design was derived from the Vought F-8 Crusader.	1965	1967	1,545
Fairchild AC-119	Ground-attack aircraft and close air support gunship	Fairchild Aircraft		Replaced the Douglas AC-47 Spooky.	Unknown	1968	52
Lockheed AC-130	Ground-attack aircraft and close air support gunship for SOF teams	Lockheed Martin/Boeing		Modified C-130 Hercules.	1967 (AC-130A)	1968 (AC-130A)	???
Lockheed AH-56 Cheyenne	Attack compound helicopter	Lockheed Corporation		Cancelled due to the winding down of the Vietnam War.	1967	N/A	10
Grumman EA-6B Prowler	Electronic warfare/attack aircraft	Grumman		A converted electronic warfare version of the Grumman A-6 Intruder	1968	1971	170
McDonnell Douglas A-4G Skyhawk	Fleet air defense / light attack	McDonnell Douglas		Export version of the Douglas A-4 Skyhawk.	Unknown	1967	20
Bell AH-1 SeaCobra / SuperCobra	Attack helicopter	Bell Helicopter			1969	1971	1,271+
Bell 309 KingCobra	Attack helicopter prototype	Bell Helicopter			1971 (twin-engined)/1972 (single-engined)	N/A	2
Fairchild AU-23 Peacemaker	Armed gunship, counter-insurgency, utility transport	Fairchild Aircraft		Used in the Vietnam War by the USAF and RVNAF.	1971	Unknown	Unknown
Northrop YA-9	Attack aircraft	Northrop Corporation		Developed for the United States Air Force A-X program. However, the YA-9 was dropped in favor of the A-10.	1972	N/A	2
Fairchild Republic A-10 Thunderbolt II	Close air support attack aircraft	Fairchild Republic		Known for its 30mm GAU-8/A Avenger. First production version was delivered in October 1975.	1972	October 1977	716
McDonnell Douglas A-12 Avenger II	All-weather naval stealth bomber/attack aircraft	McDonnell Douglas and General Dynamics (planned)		Planned attack aircraft for the U.S. Navy and Marine Corps; only entered mock-up stage; originally planned to replace the A-6 Intruder.	Never	N/A	0
Bell YAH-63	Attack helicopter	Bell Helicopter		Competed in and lost the Advanced Attack Helicopter to the AH-64 Apache.	1975	N/A	3
Boeing AH-64 Apache	Attack helicopter	Hughes Helicopters (1975–1984); McDonnell Douglas (1984–1997); Boeing Defense, Space & Security (1997–present)		Winner of the Advanced Attack Helicopter program.	1975	1986	2,700+
McDonnell Douglas F/A-18 Hornet	Multirole fighter	McDonnell Douglas (1974–1997) Northrop (1974–1994) Boeing (1997–2000)		Used extensively by the U.S. Navy and U.S. Marine Corps.	1978	1983	1,480
Lockheed F-117 Nighthawk	Stealth attack aircraft	Lockheed Corporation			1981	1983	64 (5 YF-117As, 59 F-117As)
Vought YA-7F	Prototype transonic attack aircraft	Ling-Temco-Vought/Vought			1989	N/A	0
LTV A-7P Corsair II		Ling-Temco-Vought		Export LTV A-7 Corsair II for the Portuguese Air Force	Unknown	Unknown	Unknown
Boeing F/A-18E/F Super Hornet	Carrier-based multirole fighter	McDonnell Douglas(1995–1997) Boeing Defense, Space & Security(1997–present)		Upgraded version of the McDonnell Douglas F/A-18 Hornet. Replaced its predecessor and the Grumman A-6 Intruder.	1995	1999 2001 (IOC)	≥632 as of April 2020
Boeing–Sikorsky RAH-66 Comanche	Reconnaissance and attack helicopter	Boeing Helicopters/Sikorsky Aircraft		Stealth helicopter as part of the cancelled Light Helicopter Experimental	1996	N/A	2
Bell AH-1Z Viper	Attack helicopter	Bell Helicopter			2000	2011 (IOC)	195
Boeing EA-18G Growler	Electronic warfare aircraft	Boeing		Developed from the Boeing F/A-18E/F Super Hornet.	2006	2009	172 as of October 2021
Lockheed Martin F/A-22 Raptor	Air superiority fighter	Lockheed Martin Aeronautics / Boeing Integrated Defense Systems		Re-designated the F-22 when it entered service in December 2005.	1997	2005	
F/A-XX	Program/project	None		Proposed for the Next Generation Air Dominance (NGAD) program.	N/A	N/A	N/A
