= List of United States military helicopters =

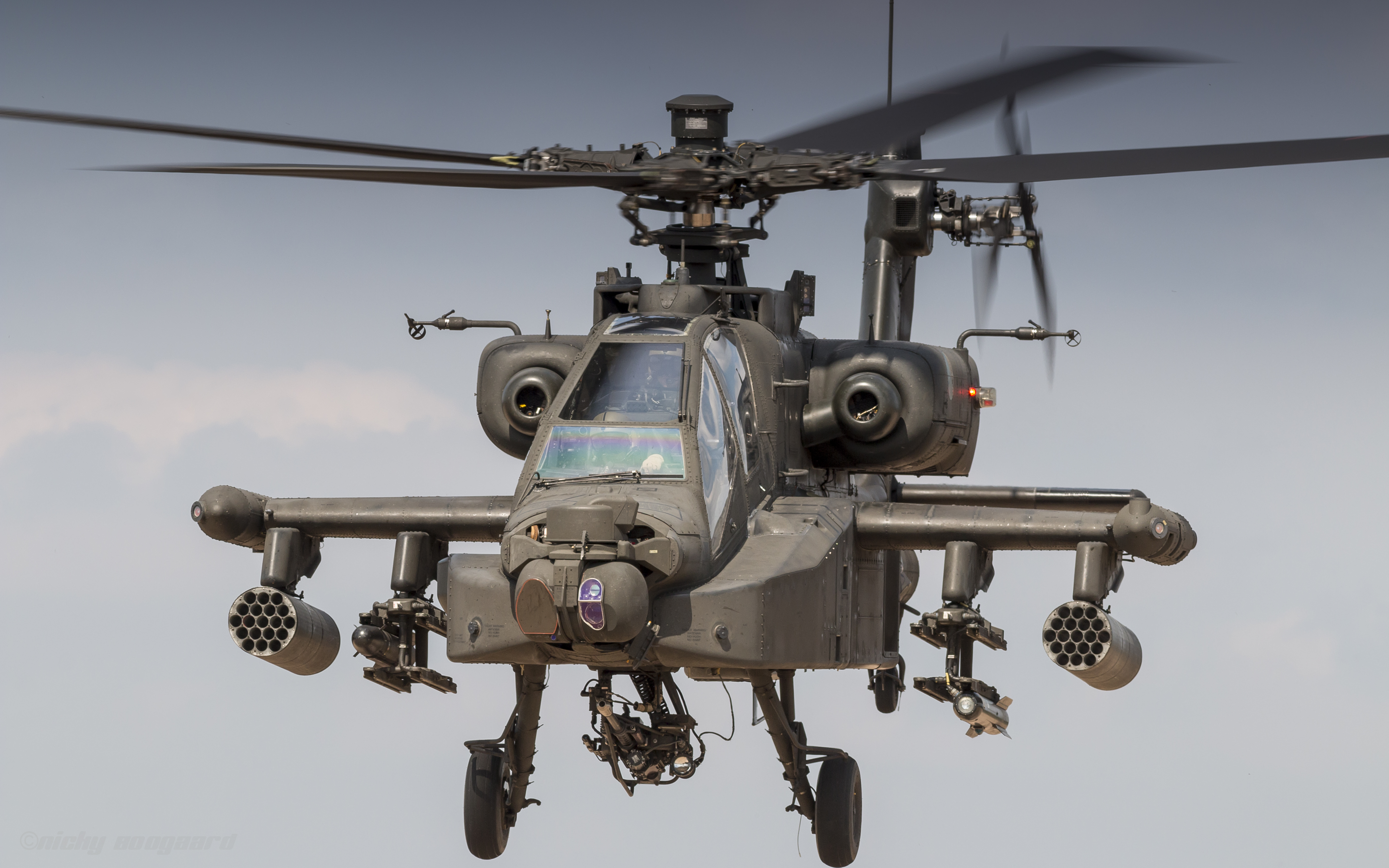
A Boeing AH-64 Apache, an attack helicopter

This is a list of United States military helicopters.

| Name | Role | Manufacturer | Notes | Year of first flight | Introduction | Number built |
|---|---|---|---|---|---|---|
| Platt-LePage XR-1 | Experimental helicopter | Platt-LePage Aircraft Company | First helicopter tested by the USAAF. | 1941 | Never | 2 |
| Sikorsky R-4 | | Sikorsky Aircraft Corporation | World's first large-scale mass-produced helicopter and the first helicopter used by the United States Army Air Forces. | 1942 | Unknown | 131 |
| Sikorsky H-5 | | Sikorsky Aircraft Corporation | | 1943 | 1945 | 300 |
| Sikorsky R-6 | | Sikorsky Aircraft Corporation | World War II | 1943 | 1945 | 225 |
| Kellett R-8 | Experimental helicopter | Kellett Autogiro Corporation | Prototype. Program canceled 1946. | 1944 | Never | 2 |
| Bell H-13 Sioux | Light observation helicopter | Bell Aircraft Corporation | Bell 47 variant. | 1945 | 1946 | 2407 |
| Bell H-12 | Military utility helicopter | Bell Aircraft | Company Model 48 | 1946 | Never | 13 |
| Kellett XR-10 | Military transport helicopter | Kellett Autogiro Corporation | Prototype. Program canceled 1949. | 1947 | Never | 2 |
| Sikorsky S-52 | Utility helicopter | Sikorsky Aircraft Corporation | | 1947 | 1951 | 93 |
| Kaman HH-43 Huskie | Firefighting/rescue | Kaman Aircraft | | 1953 | 1958 | 193 |
| Piasecki HUP | Utility helicopter | Piasecki Helicopter | The « Army Mule ». | 1948 | 1949 | 339 |
| Hiller OH-23 Raven | Multipurpose light helicopter | Hiller Aircraft | | 1948 | 1950 | 2000 |
| McCulloch MC-4 | Light helicopter | McCulloch Aircraft Corporation | Evaluated by the United States Army as the YH-30 and the United States Navy as the XHUM-1. | 1948 | Never | Unknown |
| Sikorsky H-19 | Utility helicopter | Sikorsky Aircraft Corporation | | 1949 | 1950 | 1102 |
| Vertol H-21 | Cargo helicopter | Piasecki Helicopter | | 1952 | 1954 | 707 |
| American Helicopter XH-26 Jet Jeep | Experimental tip jet observation helicopter | American Helicopter | | 1952 | Never | 5 |
| Sikorsky CH-37 Mojave | Assault Transport | Sikorsky Aircraft Corporation | Large heavy lift helicopter used by the Army designated "Mojave" and Marines nicknamed "Deuce" | 1953 | 1956 | 153 |
| Cessna CH-1 Skyhook | Light helicopter | Cessna | Only helicopter ever built by the Cessna Aircraft Company. | 1953 | 1956 | ~50 |
| De Lackner HZ-1 Aerocycle | Experimental rotorcraft | de Lackner Helicopters | Prototype. Program canceled. | 1954 | Never | 12 |
| Sikorsky H-34 | Anti-submarine warfare helicopter | Sikorsky Aircraft Corporation | | 1954 | 1954 | 2108 |
| Bell 201 | Experimental helicopter | Bell Aircraft | | 1954 | Never | 1 |
| Bell UH-1 Iroquois | Utility helicopter | Bell Aircraft | The UH-1 was in the service of the U.S. Army during the Vietnam War. Nicknamed the "Huey" because the original Army designation was HU-1. | 1956 | 1959 | >16,000 |
| Hughes TH-55 Osage | Light utility and trainer helicopter | Hughes Helicopters | Model 269/Model 300 | 1956 | 1961 | 2,800 |
| Sikorsky S-62 | SAR/utility helicopter | Sikorsky Aircraft Corporation | It was used by the United States Coast Guard. | 1958 | 1961 | 175 |
| Sikorsky SH-3 Sea King | ASW/SAR/utility helicopter | Sikorsky Aircraft Corporation | used as the official helicopters of the President of the United States Marine One | 1959 | 1961 | 1500 |
| Sikorsky S-61R | Medium-lift transport/SAR helicopter | Sikorsky Aircraft Corporation | The S-61R served in the United States Air Force and in the United States Coast Guard. | 1959 | 1961 | 173 |
| Kaman SH-2 Seasprite | Anti-submarine warfare helicopter | Kaman Aircraft | | 1959 | 1962 | 184 |
| Boeing CH-47 Chinook | Transport helicopter | Boeing | | 1961 | 1962 | 1180 |
| Sikorsky CH-54 | Heavy-lift cargo helicopter | Sikorsky Aircraft Corporation | | 1962 | 1964 | 105 |
| Boeing CH-46 Sea Knight | Cargo helicopter | Boeing | From 2004, Used only by the United States Marine Corps until 2015 retirement. | 1962 | 1964 | 524 |
| Hughes OH-6 Cayuse | Light Observation Helicopter / Utility | Hughes Helicopters | Won a prototype run off between Bell, Hiller and Hughes. The Bell prototype went on to become the OH-58. The OH-6 itself is the parent of the MD 500 and MH-6 variants. | 1963 | 1966 | 1420 |
| MD Helicopters MH-6 Little Bird | Light Observation Helicopter | MD Helicopters | Derived from OH-6 lineage; used for special operations in the United States Army. | 1963 | 1980 | ? |
| Sikorsky CH-53 Sea Stallion | Heavy-lift cargo helicopter | Sikorsky Aircraft Corporation | | 1964 | 1966 | 500 |
| Bell AH-1 Cobra | Attack helicopter | Bell Helicopter Textron | Was developed by Bell as an independent concept armed helicopter. The majority of parts are interchangeable with the UH-1 series. The AH1-W and Z are used in the US Marine Corps | 1965 | 1967 | 1116 |
| Bell 206 | Multipurpose Utility helicopter | Bell Aircraft Corporation | Common prototype with OH-58. | 1966 | 1967 | 7300 |
| Bell OH-58 Kiowa | Observation/scout helicopter | Bell Aircraft Corporation | Five versions: OH-58A, OH-58C, OH58C/S, OH-58D, OH-58D Kiowa Warrior | 1966 | 1969 | 2200 |
| Bell UH-1N Twin Huey | Utility helicopter | Bell Textron | | 1969 | 1970 | 294 |
| Lockheed AH-56 Cheyenne | Attack helicopter | Lockheed Corporation | Prototype. Program canceled 1972. | 1967 | Never | 10 |
| Sikorsky MH-53 | Heavy-lift helicopter | Sikorsky Aircraft | U.S. Air Force variant of the CH-53. | 1967 | 1968 | 72 |
| Sikorsky CH-53E Super Stallion | Heavy-lift cargo helicopter | Sikorsky Aircraft Corporation | | 1974 | 1981 | ~170 |
| Sikorsky UH-60 Black Hawk | Utility helicopter | Sikorsky Aircraft Corporation | Black Hawks have served in combat during conflicts in Grenada, Panama, Iraq, Somalia, the Balkans, Afghanistan, and other areas in the Middle East. | 1974 | 1979 | 2600 |
| Sikorsky HH-60 Pave Hawk | Combat Search and Rescue helicopter | Sikorsky Aircraft Corporation | This is another variant of the U.S. Army's UH-60 Blackhawk. | 1974 | 1982 | 101 |
| Bell YAH-63 | Attack helicopter | | Bell Model 409. Particaped in the Advanced Attack Helicopter (AAH) competition. Lost to the YAH-64. | 1975 | Never | 3 |
| Boeing AH-64 Apache | Attack helicopter | Boeing | Manufactured by McDonnell-Douglas after buyout of Hughes Helicopters. | 1975 | 1984 | 1174 |
| MD 500 Defender | Light multi-role helicopter | MD Helicopters | Based on the Hughes OH-6 Cayuse light utility helicopter. Originally developed by Hughes Helicopters. Purchased by McDonnell-Douglas, eventually sold to MD Helicopters. | 1976 | 1976 | 471 |
| Sikorsky SH-60 Seahawk | Multimission maritime helicopter | Sikorsky Aircraft Corporation | Sikorsky UH-60 Black Hawk variant. | 1979 | 1984 | 344 |
| Sikorsky HH-60H | U.S. Navy Special Operations and Combat Search and Rescue (CSAR) helicopter | Sikorsky Aircraft Corporation | Sikorsky UH-60 Black Hawk variant. | Unknown | 1982 | 112 |
| Eurocopter MH-65 Dolphin | Search and rescue helicopter | Aérospatiale Helicopter Corporation American Eurocopter | Used by the United States Coast Guard | 1980 | 1985 | 102 |
| Kaman SH-2G Super Seasprite | ASW helicopter | Kaman Aircraft | | 1985 | 1993 | Unknown |
| Boeing-Sikorsky RAH-66 Comanche | Reconnaissance and attack helicopter | Boeing/Sikorsky | Prototype. Program canceled 2004. | 1996 | Never | 5 |
| Eurocopter UH-72 Lakota | Utility helicopter | Eurocopter | Adapted from the Eurocopter EC145 and built in Columbus, Mississippi. | 1999 | 2006 | 250 |
| Bell AH-1Z Viper | Attack helicopter | Bell | | 2000 | 2010 | 229 |
| Bell UH-1Y Venom | Utility helicopter | Bell Aircraft Corporation | The UH-1Y Venom is currently in full-rate production to replace the UH-1N Twin Huey | 2001 | 2008 | 92 |
| Boeing AH-6 | Light attack/reconnaissance helicopter | Boeing Rotorcraft Systems | | ULB: September 8, 2004 MELB: September 20, 2006 | In development | Unknown |
| Bell ARH-70 Arapaho | Armed reconnaissance helicopter | Bell Aircraft Corporation | Prototype. Program canceled 2008. | 2006 | Never | 4 |
| Piasecki X-49 | Experimental high-speed compound helicopter | Piasecki Helicopter | Prototype under development. | 2007 | | 1 |
| Lockheed Martin VH-71 Kestrel | Executive transport helicopter | Lockheed Martin; AgustaWestland; Bell Helicopter (assembly) | Variant of the AgustaWestland AW101 designed to replace the United States Marine Corps' Marine One presidential transport fleet. In January 2005, the US101 was selected for the VXX Presidential Helicopter Replacement Program, and was promptly re-designated as the VH-71. However, development was subject to delays, cost overruns, and engineering issues. | 2007 | Canceled | 9 |
| X2 | Experimental compound helicopter | Sikorsky Aircraft / Schweizer Aircraft | | 2008 | Never | 1 |
| Sikorsky CH-53K King Stallion | Heavy-lift cargo helicopter | Sikorsky Aircraft Corporation | Developed from the Sikorsky CH-53E Super Stallion. | 2015 | 2022 | 9 |
| Sikorsky VH-92 Patriot | Medium-lift transport/utility helicopter | Sikorsky Aircraft | Developed to replace the United States Marine Corps' Marine One U.S. presidential transport fleet. It is a militarized variant of the Sikorsky S-92. | 2017 | In development | Unknown |
| Sikorsky-Boeing SB-1 Defiant | Compound helicopter | Sikorsky Aircraft / Boeing | Sikorsky Aircraft and Boeing entry for the United States Army's Future Long-Range Assault Aircraft program to replace the Sikorsky UH-60 Black Hawk. Army selected the rival Bell V-280 Valor as the winner of the program. | 2019 | Never | ? |

== See also ==
- List of U.S. military equipment named for Native Americana
- U.S. DoD aircraft designations table
- List of military aircraft of the United States

== Notes ==
The U.S. Air Force (USAF) did not exist until September 1947. Therefore the Sikorski R4 of 1942 "notes" indicate USAF. Possibly it was meant to be USAAF (U.S. Army Air Force).

== Bibliography ==
- Andrade, John M. (1979). U.S. Military Aircraft Designations and Serials Since 1909. Midland Counties Publications. ISBN 978-0-904597-22-6.
- (in French) Philippe Poulet et Frédéric Ogeret, La fabuleuse histoire de l'hélicoptère, Éditions Mission Spéciale, 2007, 312 p. ISBN 978-2-916357-14-0
- (in French) Ouvrage collectif, L'Atlas des hélicoptères, Éditions Atlas, Éditions Glénat, 2002, 240 p. ISBN 2-7234-3368-4
