= Cobra gunship =

Cobra gunship may refer to a number of helicopters of the Bell Huey family:

- Bell AH-1 Cobra
- Bell 309 KingCobra
- Bell AH-1 SuperCobra
