= Boeing Vertol YUH-61 =

Utility helicopter in the US Army

YUH-61
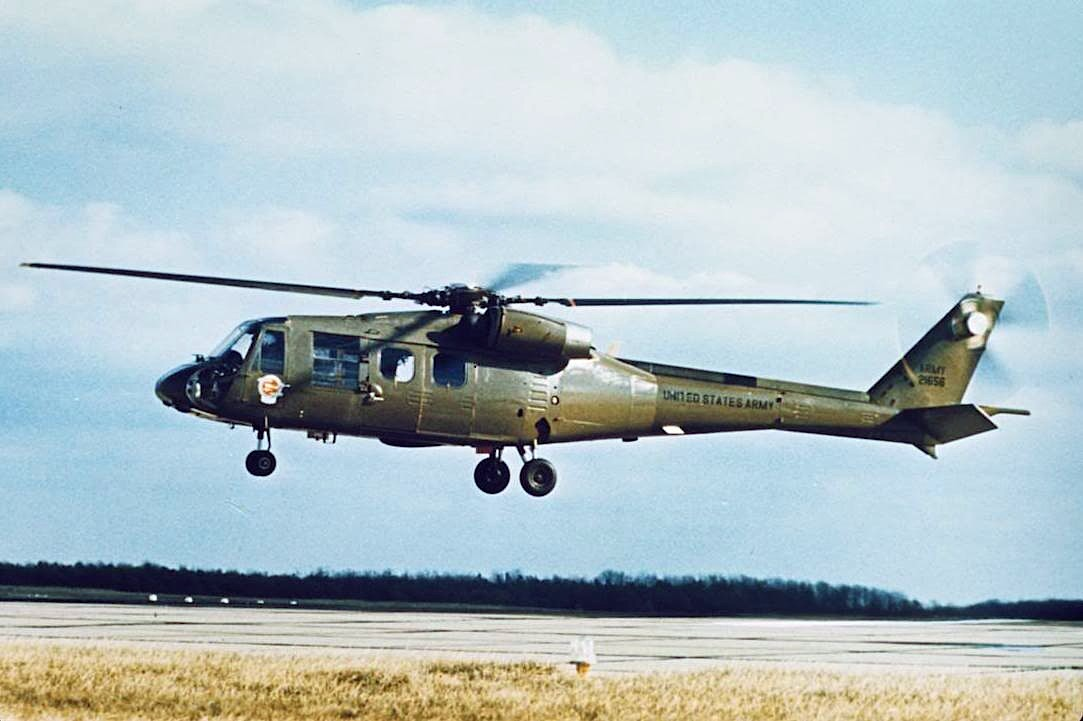
- Boeing Vertol YUH-61A

General information
- Type: Utility transport helicopter
- Manufacturer: Boeing Vertol
- Status: Program terminated
- Primary user: United States Army
- Number built: 3

History
- First flight: 29 November 1974

The Boeing Vertol YUH-61 (company designation Model 179) is a twin turbine-engined, medium-lift, military assault/utility helicopter. The YUH-61 was the runner-up in the United States Army Utility Tactical Transport Aircraft System (UTTAS) competition in the early 1970s to replace the Bell UH-1 Iroquois helicopter. At the end of the flyoff program, Sikorsky Aircraft was awarded a contract to develop and build its UH-60A entry.

== Development ==
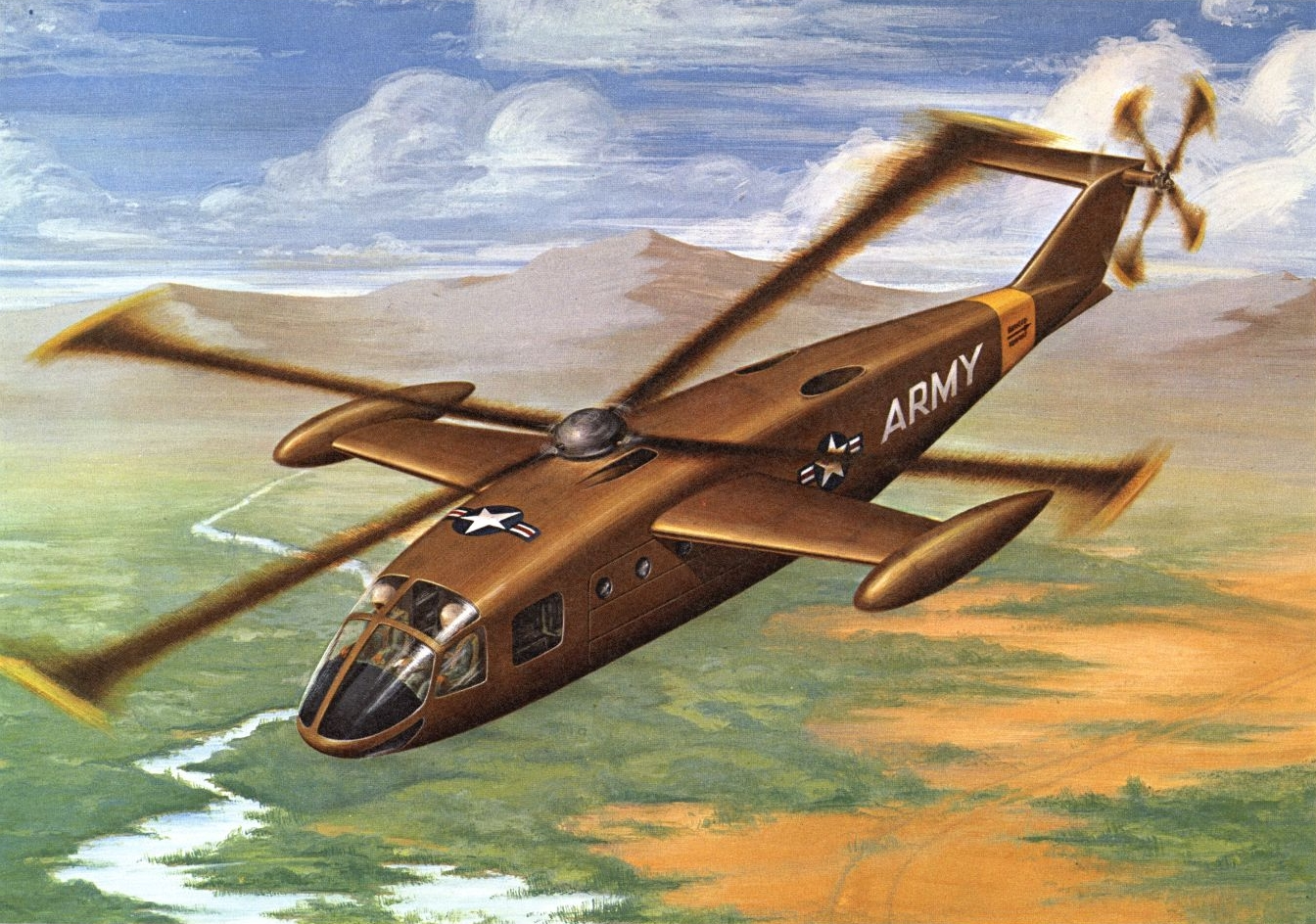
Early concept for a winged UTTAS

Under a contract awarded in August 1972, Boeing Vertol designed and delivered three prototypes to compete UTTAS program. When Boeing Vertol failed to win the Army competition, it pinned its hope on winning civil orders and the US Navy's LAMPS III program. In the end, a variant of the Sikorsky design, the SH-60B, won the Navy contract, and the civil orders received were canceled.

Three aircraft were built and a further two were cancelled and not completed. An attack helicopter design, using the YUH-61's dynamic system (engines, rotor systems and gearboxes), was proposed for the Advanced Attack Helicopter (AAH) competition, but did not make the downselect that resulted in the Bell YAH-63 and Hughes YAH-64 being built. The Boeing Vertol AAH design was unique in that the crew were seated in a laterally staggered tandem configuration.

== Design ==
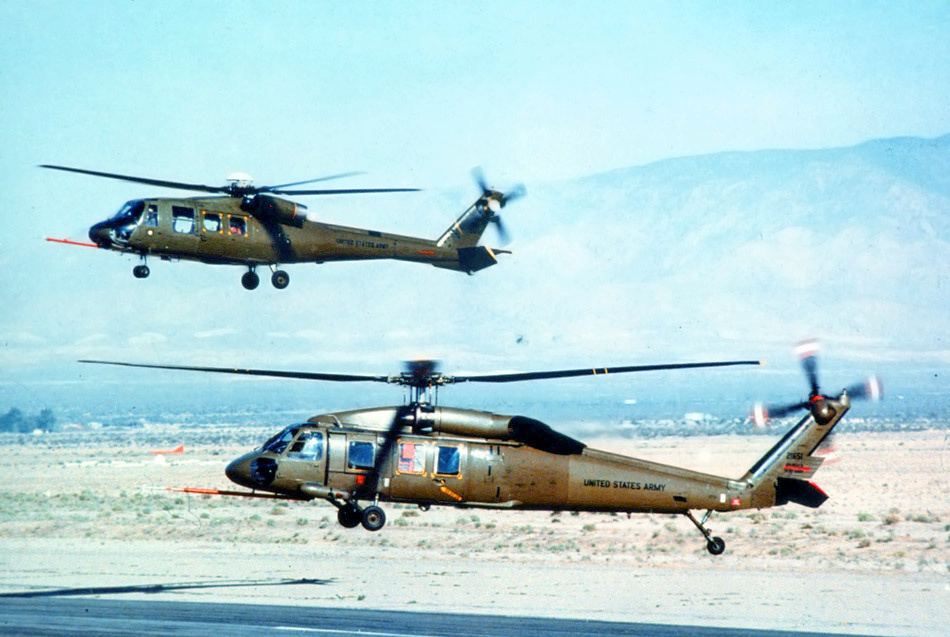
The flyoff competition in the mid-1970s between the Sikorsky YUH-60A (in front) and Boeing Vertol YUH-61A prototypes

The YUH-61 was designed to meet the UTTAS requirements for improved reliability, survivability and lower life-cycle costs, resulting in features such as dual-engines with improved hot and high altitude performance, and a modular design (reduced maintenance footprint); run-dry gearboxes; ballistically tolerant, redundant subsystems (hydraulic, electrical and flight controls); crashworthy crew (armored) and troop seats; dual-stage oleo main landing gear; ballistically tolerant, crashworthy main structure; quieter, more robust main and tail rotor systems; and a ballistically tolerant, crashworthy fuel system.

Transport aboard the C-130 limited the UTTAS cabin height and length. This also resulted in the main rotor being mounted very close to the cabin roof.

While Sikorsky chose a fully articulated rotor head with elastomeric bearings, Boeing Vertol chose a rigid main rotor design, based upon technology supplied by MBB, which was partnered with Boeing Vertol at the time. Boeing Vertol also selected to use a tricycle landing gear and a pusher tail rotor, as opposed to the tail wheel configuration and canted tractor tail rotor that Sikorsky chose, meaning that the vector of lift produced by the tail rotor was directed towards the vertical stabilizer, while the Sikorsky's was away from it.

== Variants ==
- Model 237: naval version of the YUH-61 for the USN's LAMPS II competition (ship-based multi-purpose helicopter) and lost out to Sikorsky SH-60 Seahawk; no models built
- Model 179: civilian 14–20 passenger utility helicopter later canceled; 1 model built

== Surviving aircraft ==
The four build machines with serial numbers:

- 73-21656 - was tested and flown, is now a exhibit in the United States Army Aviation Museum in Fort Rucker, Alabama.
- 73-21657 - was tested and flown, later got sold to TV and Movie production company in Las Vegas, Nevada.
- 73-21658 - was tested and flown, is now part of the Fire Department Training Grounds in Fort Rucker, Alabama.
- 73-21659 - remains property of Boeing, remain and status unknown

== Specifications (YUH-61A) ==
Data from Modern Military Aircraft

General characteristics

- Crew: Minimum 2 pilots
- Capacity: 14–20 passengers
- Length: 60 ft 8.5 in (18.504 m)
- Height: 15 ft 6 in (4.72 m)
- Empty weight: 9,750 lb (4,423 kg)
- Max takeoff weight: 17,700 lb (8,029 kg)
- Powerplant: 2 × General Electric T700 turboshaft engines, 1,536 hp (1,145 kW) each
- Main rotor diameter: 49 ft (15 m)
- Main rotor area: 1,885 sq ft (175.1 m^{2})

Performance

- Maximum speed: 155 kn (178 mph, 286 km/h)
- Combat range: 320 nmi (370 mi, 600 km)

== See also ==
- US Helicopter Armament Subsystems

Aircraft of comparable role, configuration, and era

- Sikorsky S-70
- Sikorsky UH-60 Black Hawk
- Sikorsky SH-60 Seahawk

Related lists

- List of helicopters
