= Bell YAH-63 =

Pre-production attack helicopter

YAH-63A
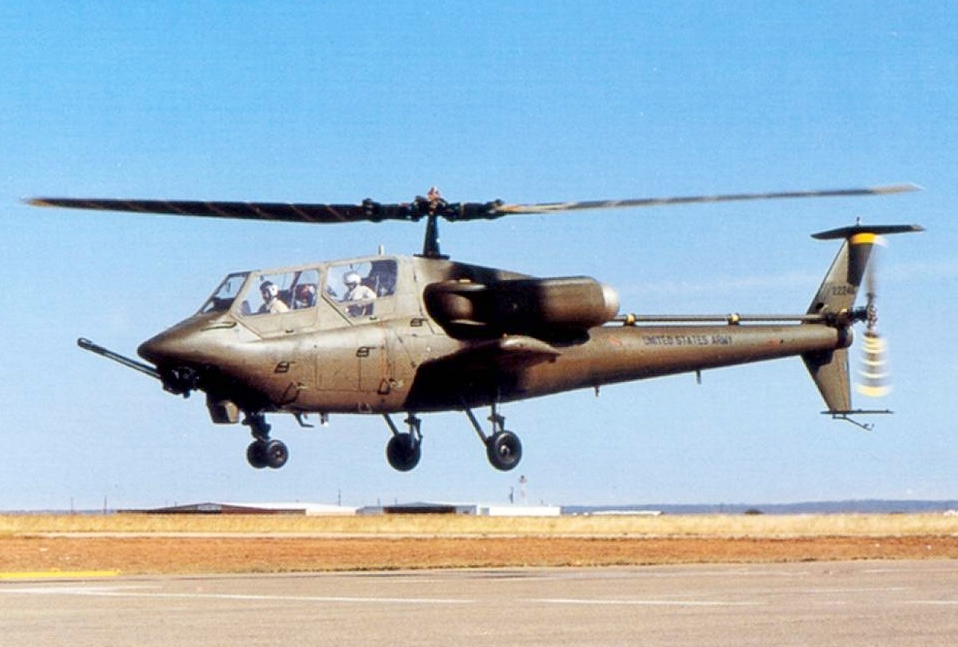
- A YAH-63A prototype

General information
- Type: Attack helicopter
- National origin: United States
- Manufacturer: Bell Helicopter
- Status: Canceled
- Primary user: United States Army
- Number built: 3

History
- First flight: 1 October 1975

The Bell YAH-63 (Model 409) was an experimental attack helicopter for the Advanced Attack Helicopter (AAH) competition. The Hughes Model 77/YAH-64, later developed into the AH-64 Apache, was selected over Bell's entry.

== Design and development ==
=== Background ===
During the mid-1960s, United States Army initiated the Advanced Aerial Fire Support System (AAFSS) program to develop the Lockheed AH-56 Cheyenne for the anti-tank gunship role. The U.S. Army pursued the AH-1G HueyCobra as an interim type for the "jungle fighting" role. However the Army's broader concern was the task of protecting Western Europe from the numerous Warsaw Pact tanks to the east.

In 1972, the Army conducted an evaluation between the Bell 309 KingCobra, the Lockheed Cheyenne, and the Sikorsky S-67 in a competitive fly-off. The fly-off began in the spring 1972 and was completed in July. In August, somewhat to everyone's shock, the Army rejected all three competitors.

Difficulties delayed the AH-56 Cheyenne development. The Army canceled the Cheyenne program in August 1972. Controversy over the Cheyenne's role in combat and the political climate regarding military acquisition programs caused the Army to amend the service's attack helicopter requirements in favor of a simpler and more survivable conventional helicopter.

=== Advanced Attack Helicopter ===
The Army sought an aircraft to fill an anti-armor attack role. The Army wanted an aircraft better than the AH-1 Cobra in firepower, performance and range. The aircraft would have the maneuverability to fly nap-of-the-earth (NoE) missions. To this end, the U.S. Army issued a request for proposals (RFP) for an Advanced Attack Helicopter (AAH) in 1972.

The Army specified that the AAH was to be powered by twin General Electric T700 turboshaft engines with 1,500 shp (1,120 kW) each. This was the same powerplant fit specified for a new Army utility helicopter competition that would be won by the Sikorsky S-70 Black Hawk. The AAH would be armed with a 30 millimeter cannon and sixteen BGM-71 TOW anti-tank missiles. The missile armament specification was later modified to include an alternate load of sixteen laser-guided AGM-114 Hellfire anti-tank missiles. Hellfire was then in development and promised greater range and lethality than TOW.

Bell, Boeing-Vertol (teamed with Grumman), Hughes, Lockheed, and Sikorsky all submitted proposals for the AAH program. In June 1973, Bell and Hughes were selected as finalists, and each was awarded a contract for the construction of two prototype aircraft.

The Bell entry, the Model 409 (YAH-63), was by no means "just another Cobra design" though it utilized Cobra technology where possible. Although it had what had become by then the typical configuration for a helicopter gunship, with a sharklike fuselage, tandem crew seating, and stub wings for armament, the YAH-63 was largely a new machine.

Distinctive features included wheeled tricycle landing gear, flat canopy window plates, an unusual "tee" tail, a large ventral fin, and a three-barreled General Electric XM-188 30 mm (1.18 in) cannon. The YAH-63's rotor mast could be lowered and the landing gear could kneel to reduce its height for transport. One less noticeable feature was that the pilot occupied the front seat instead of the rear, the reverse of the AH-1's arrangement. This was believed to be more prudent since the YAH-63 was intended to fly "in the treetops" during "nap-of-the-earth" (NoE) operations, and the pilot needed to have a clear view of the aircraft's surroundings.

The first prototype of the YAH-63 (serial 73-22246) made its initial flight on 1 October 1975. This rotorcraft crashed in June 1976 but a static test prototype was brought up to flight standard and, along with the second prototype (73-22247), entered the flyoff against the Hughes entry, the Model 77 (YAH-64).

The Hughes YAH-64 was selected in December 1976 and was developed into the production AH-64 Apache version. The Army believed that the YAH-63's two-blade rotor was more vulnerable to damage than the Apache's four-bladed rotor. In addition the service did not like the YAH-63's tricycle landing gear scheme, believing it was less stable than the Apache's "taildragger" configuration. Some observers also suspected that the Army did not want to divert Bell from AH-1 production. Bell would use its experience with the T700 engine to develop the AH-1T+ design and later AH-1W.

== Operators ==
United States

- United States Army (evaluation only)

== Specifications (YAH-63) ==
Data from International Directory of Military Aircraft, 2002-2003

General characteristics

- Crew: 2
- Length: 44 ft 7 in (13.59 m)
- Height: 13 ft 5 in (4.09 m)
- Empty weight: 6,600 lb (2,994 kg)
- Max takeoff weight: 14,750 lb (6,690 kg)
- Powerplant: 2 × General Electric T700 turboshaft engines, 1,680 shp (1,250 kW) each
- Main rotor diameter: 48 ft (15 m)
- Main rotor area: 530.83 sq ft (49.316 m^{2})

Performance

- Maximum speed: 170 kn (200 mph, 310 km/h)
- Range: 317 nmi (365 mi, 587 km)
- Endurance: 3 hours 30 minutes
- Service ceiling: 12,200 ft (3,700 m)
- Rate of climb: 1,620 ft/min (8.2 m/s)

Armament

- XM188 Gatling gun 3-barreled 30 mm cannon
- 2.75 in (70 mm) rockets: 14 rockets mounted in M or M launchers
- TOW Missiles: 4 or 8 missiles mounted in two-missile launchers on each hardpoint

== See also ==
Related development

- Bell AH-1 Cobra
- Bell AH-1 SuperCobra
- Bell 309 KingCobra

Aircraft of comparable role, configuration, and era

- Boeing AH-64 Apache

Related lists

- List of attack aircraft
- List of military aircraft of the United States
- List of rotorcraft
