= Bell 309 KingCobra =

Prototype attack helicopter

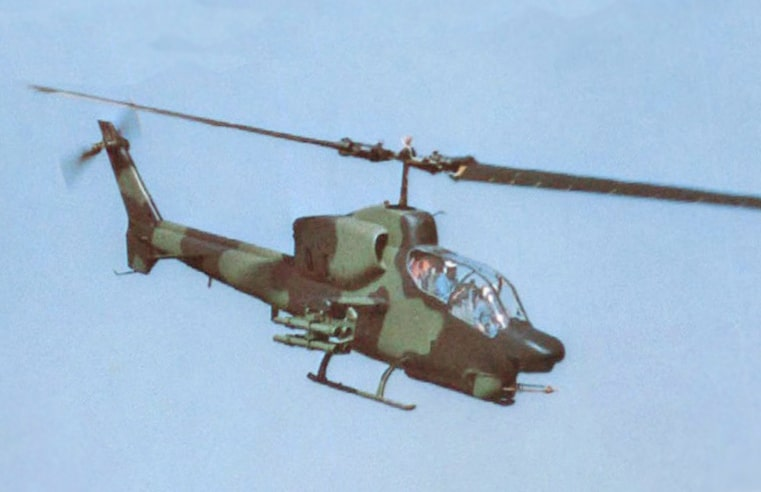
- A Bell 309 twin-engine variant

General information
- Type: Attack helicopter prototype
- Manufacturer: Bell Helicopter
- Primary user: United States Army
- Number built: 2

History
- First flight: 10 September 1971 (Twin-engine) January 1972 (Single engine)
- Developed from: Bell AH-1 Cobra

The Bell Model 309 KingCobra was an experimental attack helicopter developed by Bell Helicopter, based on the Bell AH-1 Cobra.

== Design and development ==
=== Background ===
The AH-1 Cobra was developed in the mid-1960s as an interim gunship for the U.S. Army for use in Vietnam. The Cobra shared the proven transmission, rotor system, and the T53 turboshaft engine of the UH-1 "Huey".

By June 1967, the first AH-1G HueyCobras had been delivered. Originally designated as UH-1H, the "A" for attack designation was soon adopted and when the improved UH-1D became the UH-1H, the HueyCobra became the AH-1G. Bell built 1,116 AH-1Gs for the US Army between 1967 and 1973, and the Cobras chalked up over a million operational hours in Vietnam.

The US Army purchased the AH-1G as an "interim type" for the "jungle fighting" role, but the Army's broader concern was the task of protecting Western Europe from the legions of Warsaw Pact armor to the east.

The Army had initiated the Advanced Aerial Fire Support System (AAFSS) program to develop the Lockheed AH-56 Cheyenne for the anti-tank gunship role, but development of the Cheyenne did not go smoothly, and as one writer put it, "the vultures began to gather", with Sikorsky and Bell trying to sell unsolicited alternatives to the Army. The Sikorsky offering was the S-67 Blackhawk, a sleek gunship, which despite the name had no real relation to the later UH-60 Black Hawk utility transport helicopter. The Bell offering was a refined HueyCobra, the Model 309 KingCobra.

=== KingCobra program ===
Bell announced the KingCobra program in January 1971. Two prototypes were built, one with a P&WC T400-CP-400 Twin Pac dual turboshaft engine system much like that used on the AH-1J, but with a stronger drivetrain allowing operation at full 1,800 shp (1,340 kW) power, and the other with a single Lycoming T55-L-7C turboshaft engine rated at 2,000 shp (1,490 kW).

The twin-engine KingCobra first flew on 10 September 1971. It looked much like an AH-1J, except for a longer and distinctive "buzzard beak" nose and a ventral fin like that on the original Model 209 demonstrator. However, there were significant changes that were less noticeable:

- The airframe was strengthened and the tailboom was lengthened, making the KingCobra 3 feet 7 inches (1.09 m) longer than the AH-1G.
- A new rotor was fitted, with forward swept tips and a diameter of 48 feet (15 m), compared to 44 feet (13 m) for the AH-1G. The new rotor blades improved lift and reduced noise.
- A larger 20 millimeter ammunition drum, derived from the General Dynamics F-111, was fitted, which required a deeper fuselage.
- A sensor system for night and bad weather fighting was fitted beneath the extended nose. This Stabilized Multisensor Sight (SMS) was derived from technology developed for the AH-56 Cheyenne, and included a FLIR, a low-light television (LLTV), a laser rangefinder, and a missile guidance system. The SMS could display imagery on either the gunner's sight or the pilot's head-up display (HUD). The pilot had his own LLTV, mounted in the front of the rotor fairing, to allow him to fly while the gunner hunted for targets.

New avionics were incorporated, including a Litton inertial navigation system (INS) that could store 16 different preprogrammed navigation waypoints; a radar altimeter with a ground warning system; and other improved navigation and communications gear.

The primary weapon of the KingCobra was to be the new wire-guided BGM-71 TOW anti-tank missile, which had proven highly effective in combat test firings in Vietnam from Huey gunships. This weapon could be carried in a pack of four missiles, with one pack under each stub wing for a total of eight missiles. On launch, the TOW trailed out wires to communicate command guidance updates. The missile had two infrared flares on its tail to allow the SMS to track it. All the gunner had to do was keep the target in his sight, and the missile fire control system adjusted its flight appropriately. Both the gunner and the pilot had Sperry Univac helmet-mounted sights to allow them to acquire targets for the KingCobra's missiles and gun.

A long-span "big wing", 13 feet (4.0 m) wide, was designed for the KingCobra, but apparently never fitted except as a static mockup. The "big wing" was to provide additional fuel and stores carriage capability at the wingtips.

=== Flight testing and evaluation ===
The single-engine KingCobra first flew in January 1972. Other than engine fit, it was almost identical to the twin-engine KingCobra. As it turned out, the single-engine prototype was wrecked in an accident in April, and to complete US Army evaluation the twin-engine KingCobra was modified to the single-engine configuration. The evaluation, which pitted the KingCobra against the Lockheed Cheyenne and Sikorsky S-67 in a competitive fly-off, began in the spring of 1972 and was completed in July. In August, the Army rejected all three to everyone's surprise.

=== Legacy ===
Many of the sensors and subsystems used on the 309 were years ahead of their time. The Cobra family developments after the AH-1G and AH-1J variants were connected to the Bell 309.

Based on the Model 309 and AH-1 Cobra, Bell derived a new prototype attack helicopter, the Model 409/YAH-63, for the Army's Advanced Attack Helicopter (AAH) competition beginning in 1972. Hughes' Model 77/YAH-64 was selected over Bell's Model 409/YAH-63 in 1976.

== Variants ==
- Model 249: Experimental version fitted with four rotor blades.
- Model 309 KingCobra: Experimental version powered by one Lycoming T55-L-7C engine.
- Model 309 KingCobra: Experimental version powered by two engines.

== Specifications (Bell 309) ==
Data from Verier, Bishop

General characteristics

- Crew: two (pilot and gunner)
- Length: 59 ft 3 in (18.06 m) fuselage length, 49 ft 9 in (15.16 m)
- Height: 15 ft 4 in (4.67 m)
- Empty weight: 8,926 lb (4,049 kg)
- Max takeoff weight: 15,000 lb (6,804 kg)
- Powerplant: 1 × Lycoming T55-L-7C turboshaft, 2,000 shp (1,500 kW) or alternative engine, 1 Pratt & Whitney Canada T400-CP-400 (PT6T-3 Twin Pac) turboshaft, 1,800 shp (1,300 kW)
- Main rotor diameter: 48 ft (15 m)

Performance

- Maximum speed: 183 mph (294 km/h, 159 kn)
- Never exceed speed: 230 mph (370 km/h, 200 kn)

Armament

- Guns: one M197 3-barreled 20 mm Gatling cannon
- Rockets: 2.75 in (70 mm) rockets – 7 or 19 rockets mounted in tube launchers
- Missiles: TOW Missiles – 4 or 8 missiles mounted in two-missile launchers on each hardpoint

== See also ==
Related development

- Bell AH-1 Cobra
- Bell AH-1 SuperCobra
- Bell YAH-63

Aircraft of comparable role, configuration, and era

- Boeing AH-64 Apache
- Lockheed AH-56 Cheyenne
- Sikorsky S-67 Blackhawk

Related lists

- List of attack aircraft
- List of United States attack aircraft
- List of United States military helicopters
- List of rotorcraft
