= Sikorsky S-67 Blackhawk =

Prototype attack helicopter

S-67 Blackhawk
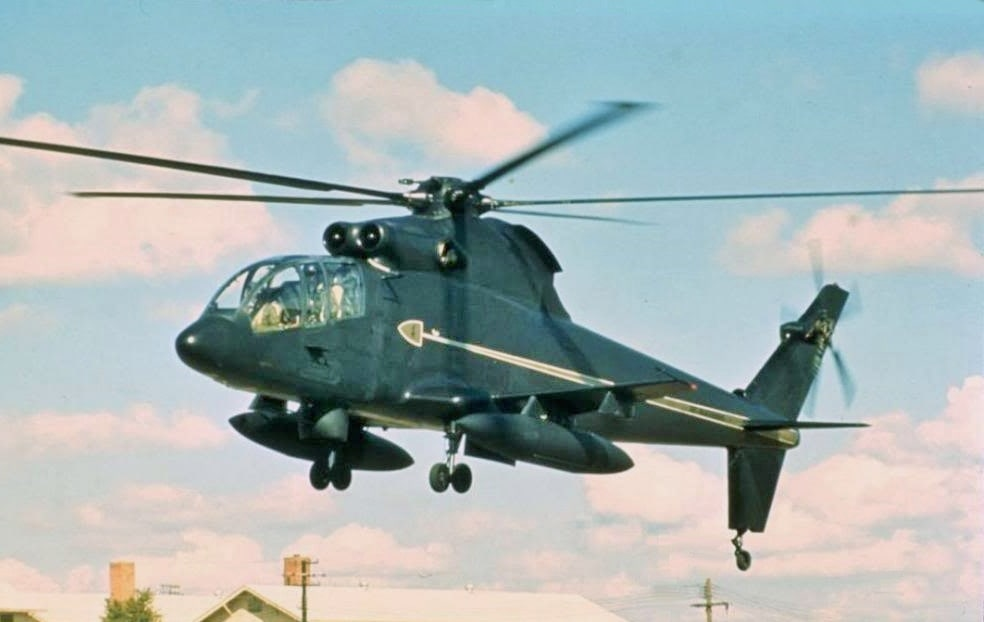
- S-67 Blackhawk in 1972

General information
- Type: Attack/assault helicopter
- Manufacturer: Sikorsky Aircraft
- Status: Destroyed (1974 crash)
- Number built: 1

History
- First flight: 20 August 1970
- Developed from: Sikorsky SH-3 Sea King

The Sikorsky S-67 Blackhawk was a private-venture, prototype attack helicopter built in 1970 with Sikorsky Aircraft research and development (R&D) funds. A tandem, two-seat aircraft designed around the dynamic drive and rotor systems of the Sikorsky S-61, it was designed to serve as an attack helicopter or to transport up to eight troops into combat.

== Design and development ==
=== AAFSS and S-66 bid ===
The United States Army issued a request for proposals (RFP) for its Advanced Aerial Fire Support System (AAFSS) program on 1 August 1964. Lockheed offered its CL-840 design, a rigid-rotor compound helicopter. Sikorsky submitted the S-66, which featured a "Rotorprop" serving as a tail rotor but as speeds increased would rotate 90° to act as pusher prop. The S-66 had short, fixed wings and was powered by a 3,400 shp (2,500 kW) Lycoming T55 turboshaft engine. The design was to have a speed of 200 knots (370 km/h) with the ability for 250 knots (460 km/h) for brief periods.

The U.S. Army awarded Lockheed and Sikorsky contracts for further study on 19 February 1965. On 3 November 1965, the Army announced Lockheed as the winner of the AAFSS program selection. The Army perceived Lockheed's design as less expensive, able to be available earlier, and that it would have less technical risk than Sikorsky's Rotorprop.

=== S-67 development ===
Lockheed's design soon ran into development problems and cost and timelines began to grow. Sensing an opportunity, Sikorsky offered an armed SH-3 Sea King (Sikorsky S-61) version. After further AAFSS problems, the company developed an intermediate, high-speed attack aircraft named the Sikorsky S-67 Blackhawk in 1970. Design work on the S-67 began in November 1969 with manufacturing following in February 1970. The Blackhawk first flew on 20 August 1970.

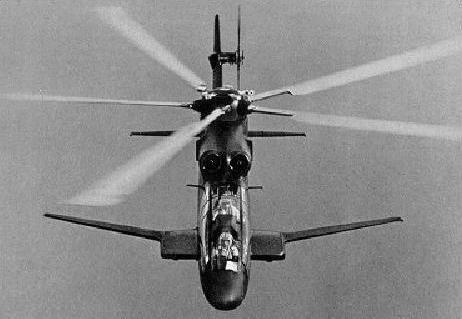
S-67 Blackhawk in head on view

The S-67 featured a five-bladed main rotor and tail rotor. The main rotor was taken from the S-61, but was modified to have a hub fairing, swept main rotor blade tips and a special "alpha-1" linkage which was added to the main rotor controls to increase collective pitch sensitivity and so extend the collective pitch range. The 20° swept main rotor blade tips help to overcome a phenomenon called sub-multiple oscillating track (SMOT) that causes variations in tip track at high Mach numbers. These allowed the S-67 to achieve and maintain high cruise speeds. To reduce drag at high speed, the main wheels retracted fully into the stub wing sponsons. It had speed brakes on the wing trailing edges that could be used to decrease speed or increase maneuverability.

The S-67 was fitted with a moving map display, a hands-on-collective radio tune control, and night vision systems. Its armament included a Tactical Armament Turret (TAT-140) with a three barrel 20 mm (0.79 in) cannon, and could carry 16 TOW missiles, 2.75-inch (70 mm) rockets, or AIM-9 Sidewinder air-to-air missiles. The Blackhawk was powered by two General Electric T58-GE-5 1,500 shaft horsepower (1,100 kW) engines.

== Operational history ==
=== Evaluation and records ===
The S-67 Blackhawk, along with the Bell 309 KingCobra, was put through a series of flight test evaluations in 1972 by the U.S. Army. Neither aircraft was selected to replace the AH-56 Cheyenne. Instead, the Army chose to create the new Advanced Attack Helicopter program, which would lead to the AH-64 Apache several years later.

The S-67 performed a series of aerobatic maneuvers during its various marketing tours, including rolls, split-S, and loops. The S-67 was reputed to be very smooth and responsive, in spite of its size and speed.

Piloted by Sikorsky Test Pilots Kurt Cannon and Byron Graham, the S-67 established two E-1 class world speed records on 14 December 1970 by flying at 348.97 km/h (217 mph) over a 3 km (1.9 mi) course, and 355.48 km/h (221 mph) on 15 to 25 km (9.3 to 16 mi) course on 19 December 1970. These records stood for eight years.

As part of internal Sikorsky R&D efforts, in 1974, the S-67 had a 3.5-foot-diameter (1.1 m) ducted fan fitted instead of its original conventional tail rotor. The S-67 with fan was tested over 29 flight hours to compare to the conventional tail. In this configuration it reached a speed of 230 mph (370 km/h) in a test dive. The original tail rotor and vertical tail fin were re-installed in August 1974.

=== Fatal crash and aftermath ===
The lone S-67 prototype crashed while conducting a low-level aerobatic demonstration at the Farnborough Airshow on 1 September 1974. The crew misjudged their pitch in a low-level roll maneuver causing the nose to drop below the horizon: they attempted to recover from their inverted position by performing a Split S maneuver, but they were too close to the ground. The aircraft struck the ground in a level attitude and immediately burst into flames. Sikorsky test pilot Stu Craig died on impact, and test pilot Kurt Cannon died nine days later from his injuries. Development work on the S-67 ceased after the accident.

The U.S. Army later assigned the name Black Hawk to the Sikorsky UH-60 Black Hawk helicopter.

== Specifications (S-67 Blackhawk) ==
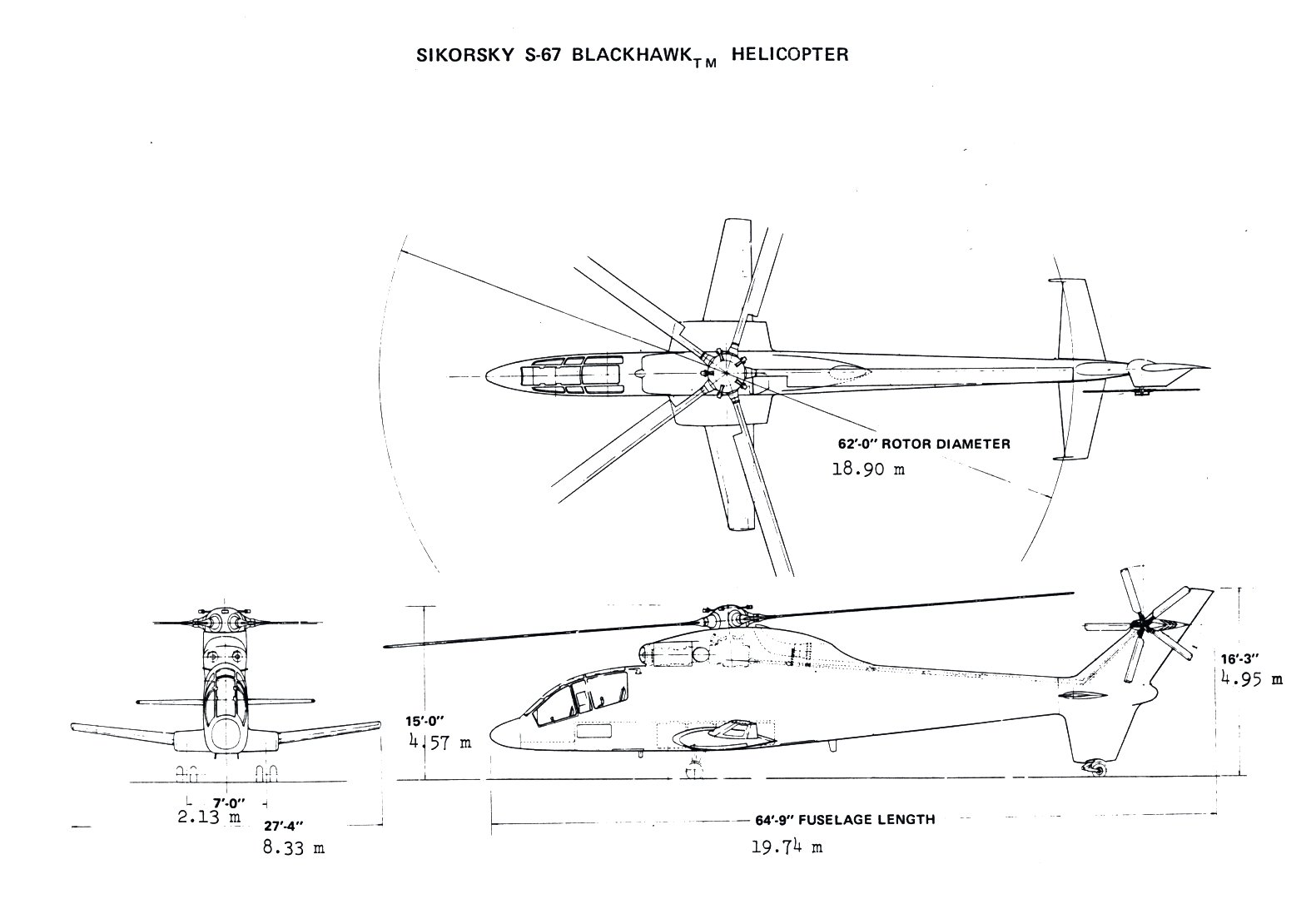
S-67 3-view

Data from Jane's all the World's Aircraft 1973–74 Illustrated Encyclopedia of Helicopters, Attack Helicopter Evaluation

General characteristics

- Crew: 2
- Capacity: (in a modified cabin up to 15 troops)
- Length: 74 ft 4 in (22.66 m) overall; 64 ft 9 in (19.74 m) fuselage only
- Wingspan: 27 ft 4 in (8.33 m)
- Height: 15 ft 0 in (4.57 m) to top of rotor hub; 18 ft 0 in (5.49 m) with rotors turning
- Aspect ratio: 8:1
- Airfoil: root: NACA 4415; tip: NACA 4412
- Empty weight: 12,514 lb (5,676 kg)
- Gross weight: 14,000 lb (6,350 kg)
- Max takeoff weight: 22,050 lb (10,002 kg)
- Fuel capacity: 400 US gal (330 imp gal; 1,500 L) in two internal tanks plus optional 2 × 200 US gal (170 imp gal; 760 L) / 2 × 300 US gal (250 imp gal; 1,100 L) / 2 × 400 US gal (330 imp gal; 1,500 L) underwing drop tanks
- Powerplant: 2 × General Electric T58-GE-5 turboshaft engines, 1,500 shp (1,100 kW) each
- Main rotor diameter: 62 ft 0 in (18.90 m)
- Main rotor area: 3,020 sq ft (281 m^{2}) 5-blade main rotor, NACA 0012 section.

Performance

- Maximum speed: 168 kn (193 mph, 311 km/h) at 18,000 lb (8,200 kg) AUW at sea level, ISA, clean
- Cruise speed: 120 kn (140 mph, 220 km/h) economical

162 kn (186 mph; 300 km/h) maximum cruise

- Never exceed speed: 200 kn (230 mph, 370 km/h)3 hours with 1,500 lb (680 kg) payload
- Service ceiling: 17,000 ft (5,200 m)
- Service ceiling one engine: 4,500 ft (1,400 m)
- Rate of climb: 2,350 ft/min (11.9 m/s)

Armament

- Guns: 1 × 30 mm (1.181 in) XM188 / 1 × 20 mm (0.787 in) XM197 / 1 × 20 mm (0.787 in) M61A2 Vulcan cannon in a TAT-140 turret under the fuselage
- Hardpoints: 4
- Rockets: 70 mm (2.8 in) Hydra rocket launchers
- Missiles: 16 × TOW missiles

== See also ==
Related development

- Sikorsky SH-3 Sea King

Aircraft of comparable role, configuration, and era

- Bell 309 KingCobra
- Boeing AH-64 Apache
- Lockheed AH-56 Cheyenne
- Mil Mi-24

Related lists

- List of rotorcraft
