= Advanced Attack Helicopter =

Family of United States attack helicopters

Advanced Attack Helicopter (AAH)
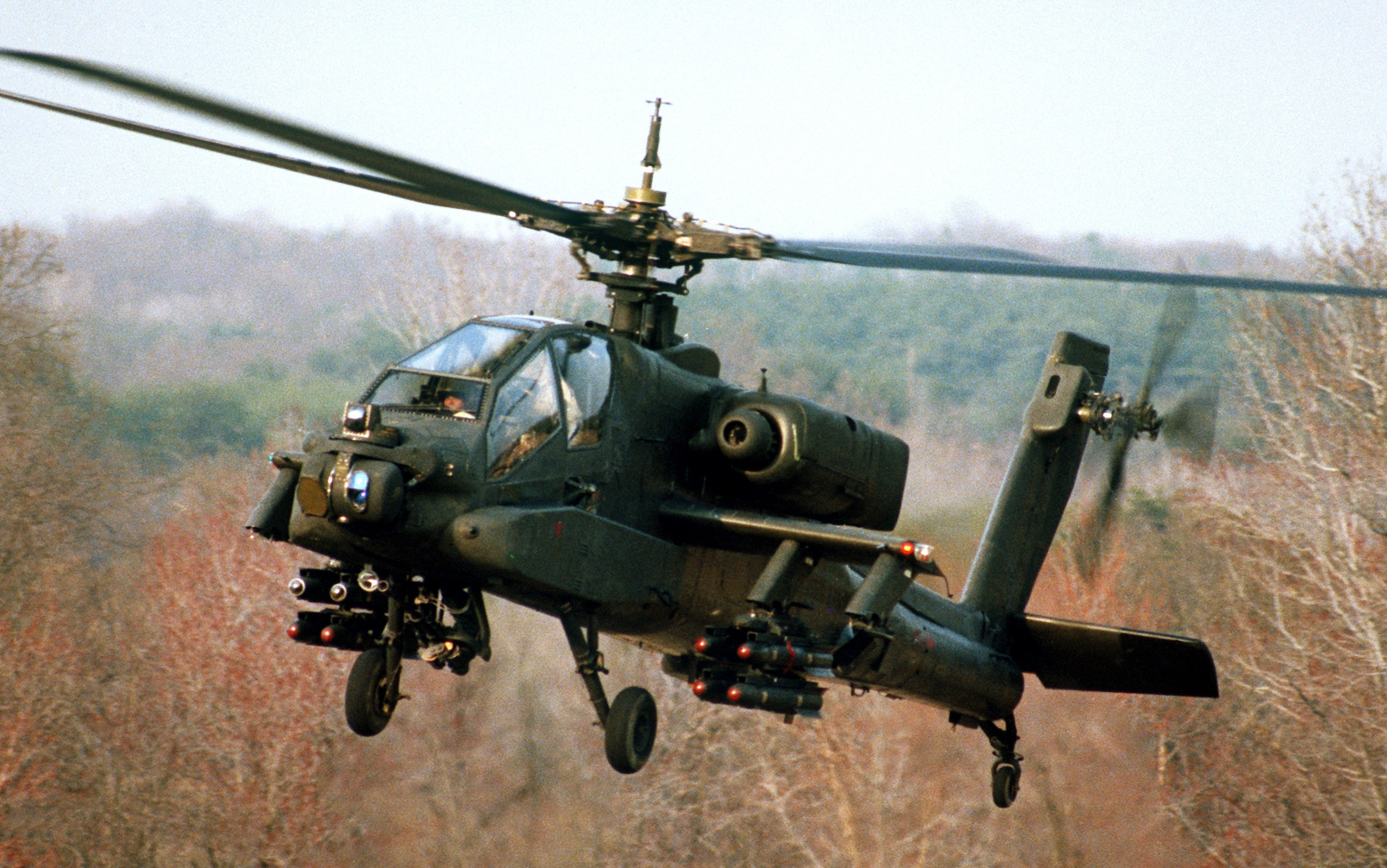
- A YAH-64A during a demonstration flight in 1982

General information
- Project for: Attack helicopter
- Issued by: United States Army
- Prototypes: Bell YAH-63; Hughes YAH-64

History
- Outcome: YAH-64 selected for production as AH-64 Apache
- Predecessors: Advanced Aerial Fire Support System
- Successors: Light Helicopter Experimental

The Advanced Attack Helicopter (AAH) was a United States Army program to develop an advanced ground attack helicopter beginning in 1972. The Advanced Attack Helicopter program followed cancellation of the Lockheed AH-56 Cheyenne. After evaluating industry proposals, the AAH competition was reduced to offerings from Bell and Hughes. Following a flight test evaluation of prototypes, Hughes' YAH-64 was selected in December 1976.

== Background ==
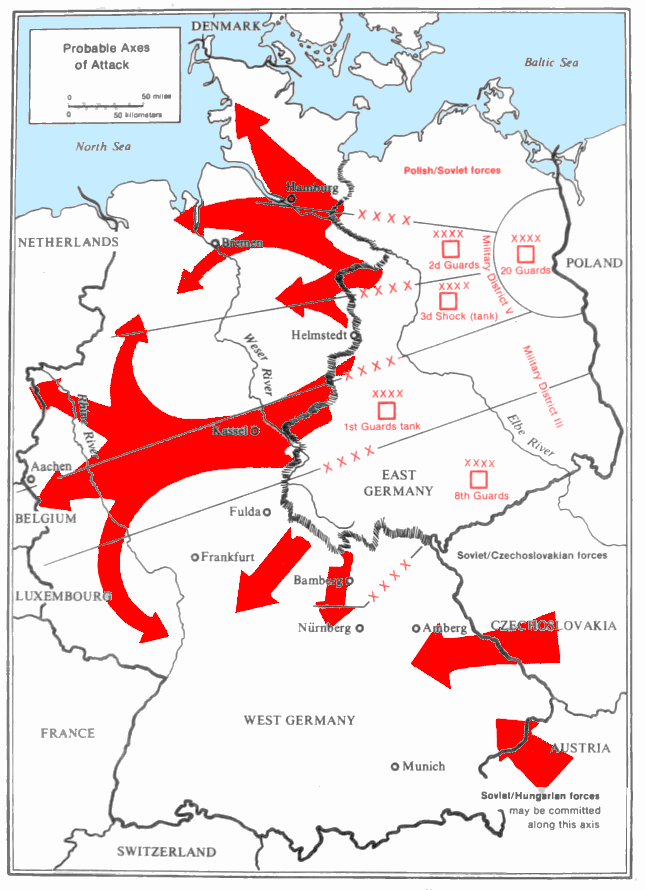
Probable axes of attack of the Warsaw Pact through the Fulda Gap and the North German Plains (according to the U.S. Army)

During the mid-1960s, the United States Army initiated the Advanced Aerial Fire Support System (AAFSS) program, which led to the development of the Lockheed AH-56 Cheyenne for use in the anti-tank gunship role. The US Army pursued the AH-1G HueyCobra as an "interim type" for the "jungle fighting" role. However, the Army's broader concern was the task of protecting Western Europe from the legions of Warsaw Pact armor to the east. The main scenario used by NATO throughout the Cold War was that, if the Soviet Union and Warsaw Pact forces were to conduct a massive tank offensive attack on Western Europe, they would probably cross either the Fulda Gap (capturing Frankfurt first and then aiming for the westward bend of the Rhine south of Wiesbaden: a total distance of just 85 miles), or cross the North German Plain (see map). The Advanced Attack Helicopter was conceived from the need to defend against such an attack.

In 1971, political friction increased between the Army and the Air Force over the close air support (CAS) mission. The Air Force asserted that the Cheyenne would infringe on the Air Force's CAS mission in support of the Army, which had been mandated with the Key West Agreement of 1948. The Department of Defense (DOD) conducted a study which concluded that the Air Force's A-X program, the Navy's proposed Harrier, and the Cheyenne were significantly different and they did not constitute a duplication of capabilities.

The Army convened a special task force under General Marks in January 1972, to reevaluate the requirements for an attack helicopter. The task force conducted flight evaluations of the AH-56, along with two industry alternatives for comparison; the Bell 309 KingCobra and Sikorsky S-67 Blackhawk. In 1972, the Army conducted a competitive fly-off of the helicopters from the spring 1972 until July 1972. The Army determined that the three helicopters could not fulfill its requirements.

In April 1972, the Senate published its report on CAS. The report recommended funding of the Air Force's A-X program, which became the A-10 Thunderbolt II, and limited procurement of the Harrier for the Navy. The report never referred to the Cheyenne by name and only offered a mediocre recommendation for the Army to continue to seek to procure attack helicopters, so long as their survivability could be improved. The Cheyenne program was canceled by the Army on 9 August 1972. The helicopter's large size and inadequate night/all-weather capability were reasons stated by the Army for the cancellation.

== Requirements, proposals, and prototypes ==
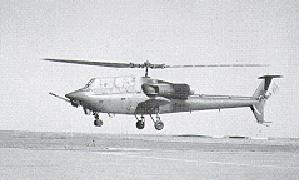
A YAH-63A prototype

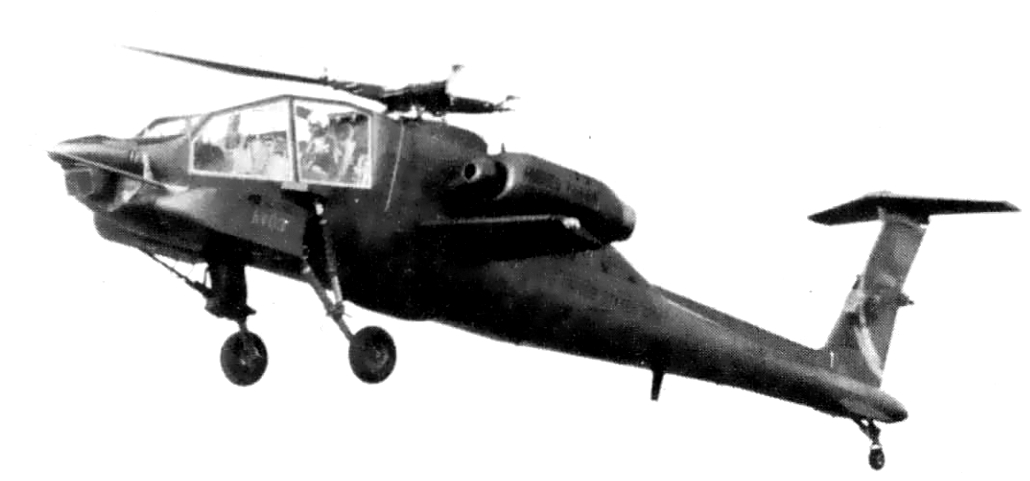
An early Hughes YAH-64A prototype with T-tail

Following the cancellation of the AH-56 Cheyenne, the US Army sought an aircraft to fill an anti-armor attack role. The Army wanted an aircraft better than the AH-1 Cobra in firepower, performance and range. It would have the maneuverability to fly nap-of-the-earth (NoE) missions. On 17 August 1972, the Army initiated the Advanced Attack Helicopter (AAH) program. AAH sought an attack helicopter based on combat experience in Vietnam, with a lower top speed of 145 knots (269 km/h) and twin engines for improved survivability. To this end, the US Army issued a Request For Proposals (RFP) for an Advanced Attack Helicopter (AAH) on 15 November 1972. The AAH requirements for reliability, survivability and life cycle costs were very similar to the UTTAS requirements.

The Army specified that the AAH was to be powered by twin General Electric T700 turboshaft engines which produce 1,500 shp (1,120 kW) each. The T700 was the same powerplant fit specified for a new Army utility helicopter competition that would be won by the UH-60 Black Hawk. The AAH would be armed with a 30 millimeter cannon and 16 TOW anti-tank missiles. The missile armament specification was later modified to include an alternate load of 16 laser-guided AGM-114 Hellfire anti-tank missiles. The Hellfire was then in development and promised greater range and lethality than TOW.

Proposals were submitted by five manufacturers: Bell, Boeing-Vertol (teamed with Grumman), Hughes Aircraft, Lockheed, and Sikorsky. In June 1973, Bell and Hughes Aircraft's Toolco Aircraft Division (later Hughes Helicopters) were selected as finalists, and were each awarded contracts for the construction of two prototype aircraft. This began the phase 1 of the competition.

Each company built two prototype helicopters for a flight test program. Bell's Model 409/YAH-63A prototype featured a three-wheel landing gear in a tricycle arrangement, and placed the pilot in the cockpit front instead of the usual rear seat, to help with nap of earth flying. Hughes' Model 77/YAH-64A prototype featured a three-wheel landing gear with the third gear at its tail. Its cockpit placed the pilot in the rear seat.

Faced with a flight deadline of the end of September, Hughes' YAH-64 first flew on 30 September 1975, while Bell's YAH-63 first flew on 1 October. The second YAH-64's first flight was on 22 November, and second YAH-63 flew on 21 December 1975. The first YAH-63 crashed in June 1976, but a static test prototype was brought up to flight standard and, along with the second prototype, entered the flyoff against Hughes' YAH-64s.

The Army put all four helicopters through a demanding program of flight testing during 1976. The Army flyoff began in June of that year.

A separate competition was conducted for the sensor and targeting suite for the AAH, with Martin Marietta and Northrop submitting proposals in November 1976.

During the prototype evaluation, the Army changed the AAH primary antitank weapon from the proven TOW wire-guided missile to the new Hellfire laser-guided missile, with over twice the effective range. This was risky because Hellfire had not even been flown at the time, with the initial development contract with Rockwell International signed in October 1976.

== Selection and afterward ==
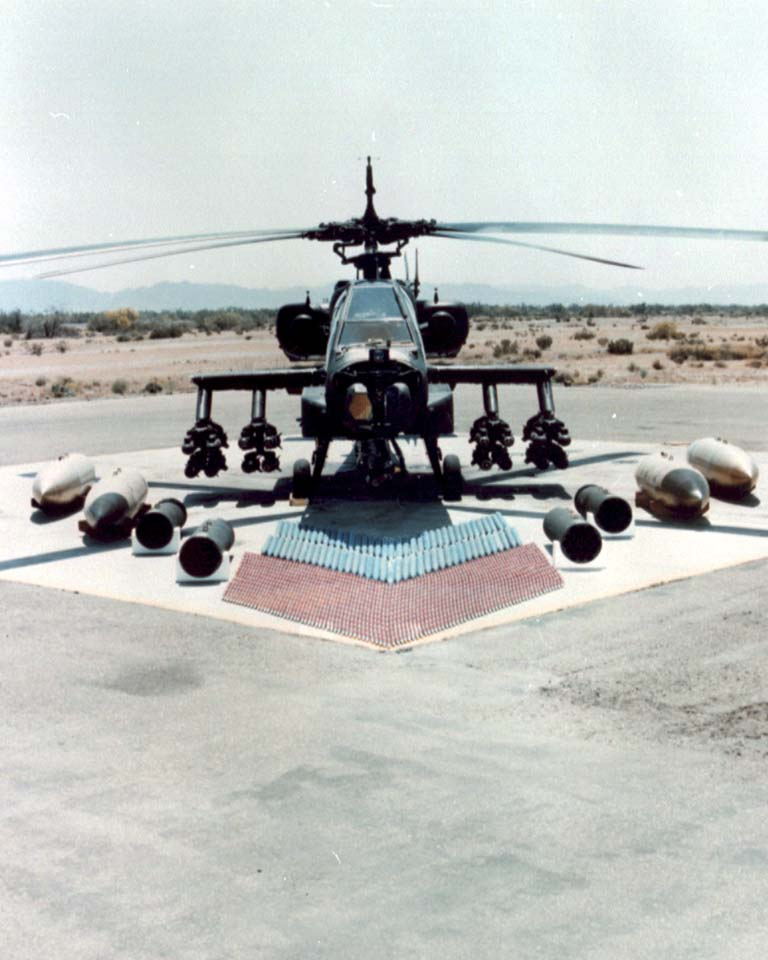
A YAH-64A

After evaluating test results, the Army selected Hughes' YAH-64A over Bell's YAH-63A on 10 December 1976. Both designs were regarded as good, but the Hughes design seemed to have an edge in survivability. Reasons for selecting the YAH-64A included its more damage-tolerant four-blade main rotor and reduced stability of the YAH-63's tricycle landing gear arrangement.

The AH-64A then entered phase 2 of the AAH program. This called for building three preproduction AH-64s, and upgrading the two YAH-64A flight prototypes and the ground test unit up to the same standard. Weapons and sensor systems were integrated and tested during this time, including the new Hellfire missile.

The Phase 2 program suffered through a number of delays for various reasons and stretched out to over five years. The first Phase 2 flight, of an upgraded initial prototype, was on 28 November 1977, with the first flight of a newbuild preproduction prototype on 31 October 1979. Initial Hellfire launches had already taken place by then, with first firings in April 1979. A competitive evaluation of preproduction helicopters, one fitted with the Martin Marietta sensor/targeting suite and the other fitted with the Northrop suite, was performed, with Martin Marietta winning the competition in April 1980. An initial production order for 11 "AH-64A Apache" attack helicopters was issued on 26 March 1982.

== See also ==
- List of attack aircraft
- List of military aircraft of the United States
- List of rotorcraft
