= Lockheed AH-56 Cheyenne =

Canceled US helicopter program

AH-56 Cheyenne
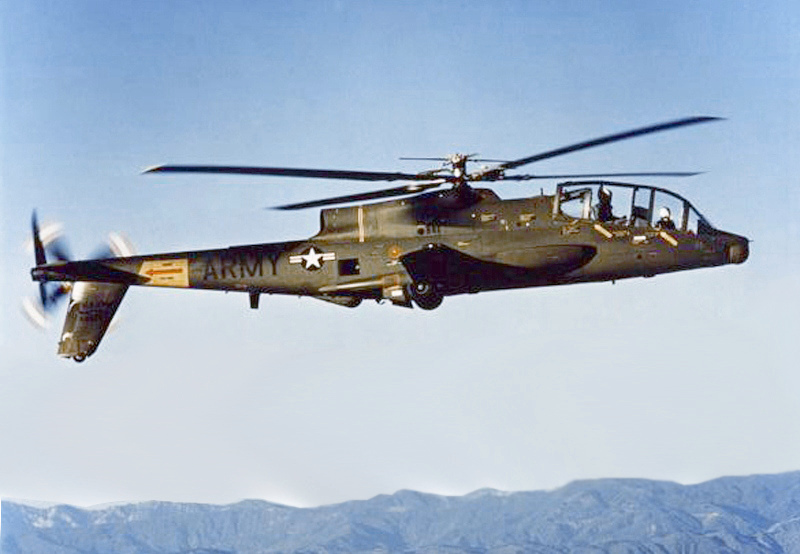
- AH-56 Cheyenne during testing

General information
- Type: Attack compound helicopter
- National origin: United States
- Manufacturer: Lockheed Corporation
- Status: Canceled
- Primary user: United States Army
- Number built: 10

History
- Manufactured: 1967–1969
- First flight: 21 September 1967

The Lockheed AH-56 Cheyenne is an attack helicopter developed by Lockheed for the United States Army. It rose from the Army's Advanced Aerial Fire Support System (AAFSS) program to field the service's first dedicated attack helicopter. Lockheed designed the Cheyenne using a four-blade rigid-rotor system and configured the aircraft as a compound helicopter with low-mounted wings and a tail-mounted thrusting propeller driven by a General Electric T64 turboshaft engine. The Cheyenne was to have a high-speed dash capability to provide armed escort for the Army's transport helicopters, such as the Bell UH-1 Iroquois.

In 1966, the Army awarded Lockheed a contract for ten AH-56 prototypes, but as a stopgap also ordered the less complex Bell AH-1G Cobra as an interim attack aircraft for combat in the Vietnam War. The AH-56's maiden flight took place on 21 September 1967. In January 1968, the Army awarded Lockheed a production contract, based on flight testing progress. A fatal crash and technical problems affecting performance put the helicopter's development behind schedule, resulting in the cancellation of the production contract on 19 May 1969. Development of the Cheyenne continued in the hope that the helicopter would eventually enter service.

As American involvement in the Vietnam War was winding down, the Army canceled the Cheyenne program on 9 August 1972. By this time, the AH-1 Cobra was widely deployed by the Army in South Vietnam and equipped with the TOW anti-tank missile. Controversy with the United States Air Force over the Cheyenne's role in combat as well as the political climate regarding military acquisition programs had caused the Army to amend the service's attack helicopter requirements in favor of a twin-engine conventional helicopter, viewed as less technical and more survivable. The Army announced a new program for an Advanced Attack Helicopter (AAH) on 17 August 1972, which led to the development of the Hughes AH-64 Apache.

== Development ==
=== Background ===
Prior to the development of the AH-56, all armed helicopters had been modifications to existing aircraft designed for unarmed uses. In 1962, then U.S. Secretary of Defense Robert McNamara convened the Howze Board to review Army aviation requirements. The board recommended an airmobile division supported by 90 armed helicopters. The recommendation of the Howze Board came at the same time the Army was preparing to deploy its first armed escort helicopters to Vietnam; 15 UH-1A Iroquois were modified with systems for mounting machine guns, grenade launchers, and rocket pods.

In June 1962, Bell Helicopter presented a new helicopter design to Army officials, in the hopes of soliciting funding for further development. The D-255 Iroquois Warrior was envisioned as a purpose-built attack aircraft based on the UH-1B airframe and dynamic components, with a nose-mounted ball turret, a belly-mounted gun pod, and stub wings for mounting rockets or SS.10 anti-tank missiles.

=== Attack helicopter requirements ===
In December 1962, Combat Development Command (CDC) drafted a Qualitative Material Requirement (QMR) for an interim, commercial off-the-shelf (COTS) aircraft, with a 140-knot (160 mph; 260 km/h) cruise speed and a 1,500-pound (680 kg) payload. This was seen as an attempt by Army officials, anticipating the potential of the D-255, to acquire an interim aircraft to fill the escort role until the Army could determine the requirements for a dedicated armed helicopter. However, the Secretary of the Army disapproved the interim approach and directed that the Army look for a more advanced system that would dramatically improve over current helicopter designs.

Based on the guidance from the Secretary of the Army, CDC established Qualitative Material Development Objectives (QMDO) for a rotary-wing aircraft with 195-knot (224 mph; 361 km/h) cruise speed, 220-knot (250 mph; 410 km/h) dash speed, and the capability to hover out-of-ground-effect (OGE) at 6,000 feet (1,800 m) on a 95 °F (35 °C) day. The speed requirements were derived from the speed of aircraft the helicopter would escort. The Director of Defense Research and Engineering (DDRE) conditionally approved the changes to the development objectives, pending his review of the proposed program. He also directed the Army to determine whether or not any other helicopter could offer an improvement in performance over the UH-1B in the meantime.

As a result, the Army Material Command (AMC) conducted a study to determine if the development objectives were feasible and also established a program office for the Fire-support Aerial System (FAS). AMC recommended to narrow the competition to compound helicopters, as they were considered the only helicopter configuration at the time capable of being developed to meet the objectives. In March 1964, the Secretary of the Army advised DDRE that modification of existing aircraft would not approach the required performance of the FAS program; the Army would continue using the armed UH-1B until development of the FAS could proceed.

=== AAFSS competition ===
On 26 March 1964, the Army Chief of Staff redesignated the FAS program as the Advanced Aerial Fire Support System (AAFSS). The development objectives document (QMDO) for the AAFSS was approved in April 1964, and on 1 August 1964, the Transportation Research and Engineering Command contacted 148 prospective contractors with a request for proposals (RFP). Bell submitted the D-262, a modification of the D-255, but still a conventional helicopter design. Sikorsky submitted the S-66, which featured a "Rotorprop" that would serve as a tail rotor but as speeds increased would rotate 90° to act as pusher propeller. Convair submitted their Model 49, a tail sitting coleopter. Lockheed submitted the CL-840 design, a rigid-rotor compound helicopter with both a pushing propeller and a conventional tail rotor mounted at the end of the tail.

The Army announced Lockheed and Sikorsky as winners of Project Definition Phase contracts on 19 February 1965. Meanwhile, the Army also continued to pursue an interim aircraft for combat in Vietnam until the AAFSS could be fielded, resulting in development of the Bell AH-1 Cobra which became the backbone of the Army's attack helicopter fleet during and after the Vietnam War.

Lockheed and Sikorsky developed proposals for their respective designs, establishing three configurations to satisfy both the development objectives and a revised RFP based on a draft requirements document. An evaluation board studied each company's proposal and then submitted its recommendation to a selection authority council on 6 October 1965. On 3 November 1965, the Army announced Lockheed as the winner of the AAFSS program. The Army perceived Lockheed's design as less expensive, able to be delivered sooner, and a lower technical risk than Sikorsky's Rotorprop. On 17 December 1965, the Army released the final requirements document. The document added fourteen requirements that were not previously addressed by Lockheed's proposal, including the addition of an aerial rocket armament subsystem.

On 23 March 1966, the Army awarded Lockheed an engineering and development contract for 10 prototypes, designating the aircraft AH-56A. Initial operating capability was planned for 1972 with an optimistic target of late 1970. Lockheed began construction of the aircraft at its Van Nuys, California facility, and on 3 May 1967, Lockheed held a roll-out ceremony for the AH-56A. The aircraft was christened Cheyenne by the Army. The first flight of the AH-56 occurred on 21 September 1967. The Secretary of Defense approved pre-production funding to support an initial production order for 375 aircraft on 8 January 1968. Manufacture of the 10 Cheyenne prototypes was completed by 1969.

== Design ==
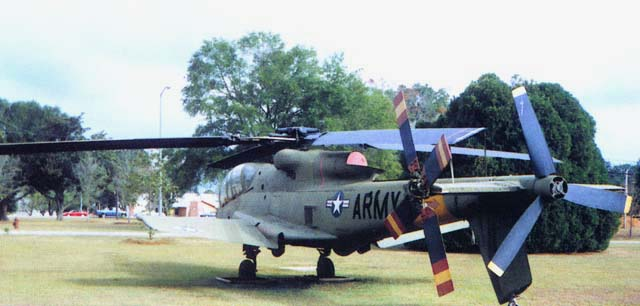
Prototype #7 on display at the U.S. Army Aviation Museum, Ft. Rucker, Alabama

Lockheed designed the Cheyenne as a compound helicopter, which combines a helicopter with fixed-wing features for increased performance, usually speed. The design included features such as a rigid main rotor, low-mounted wings, and a pusher propeller. The Cheyenne was powered by a General Electric T64 turboshaft engine. Thrust was provided by a pusher propeller at the rear of the aircraft. At high speeds, the amount of lift provided by the wings, along with thrust from the pusher prop, reduced the aerodynamic loading of the rotor. At such speeds, the rotor produced up to 20% of the lift, which could be adjusted by collective pitch control changes. Rotor tilt was controlled through gyroscopic precession. The Cheyenne achieved speeds over 200 knots (230 mph; 370 km/h), but as a compound helicopter was unable to qualify for speed records in helicopter categories.

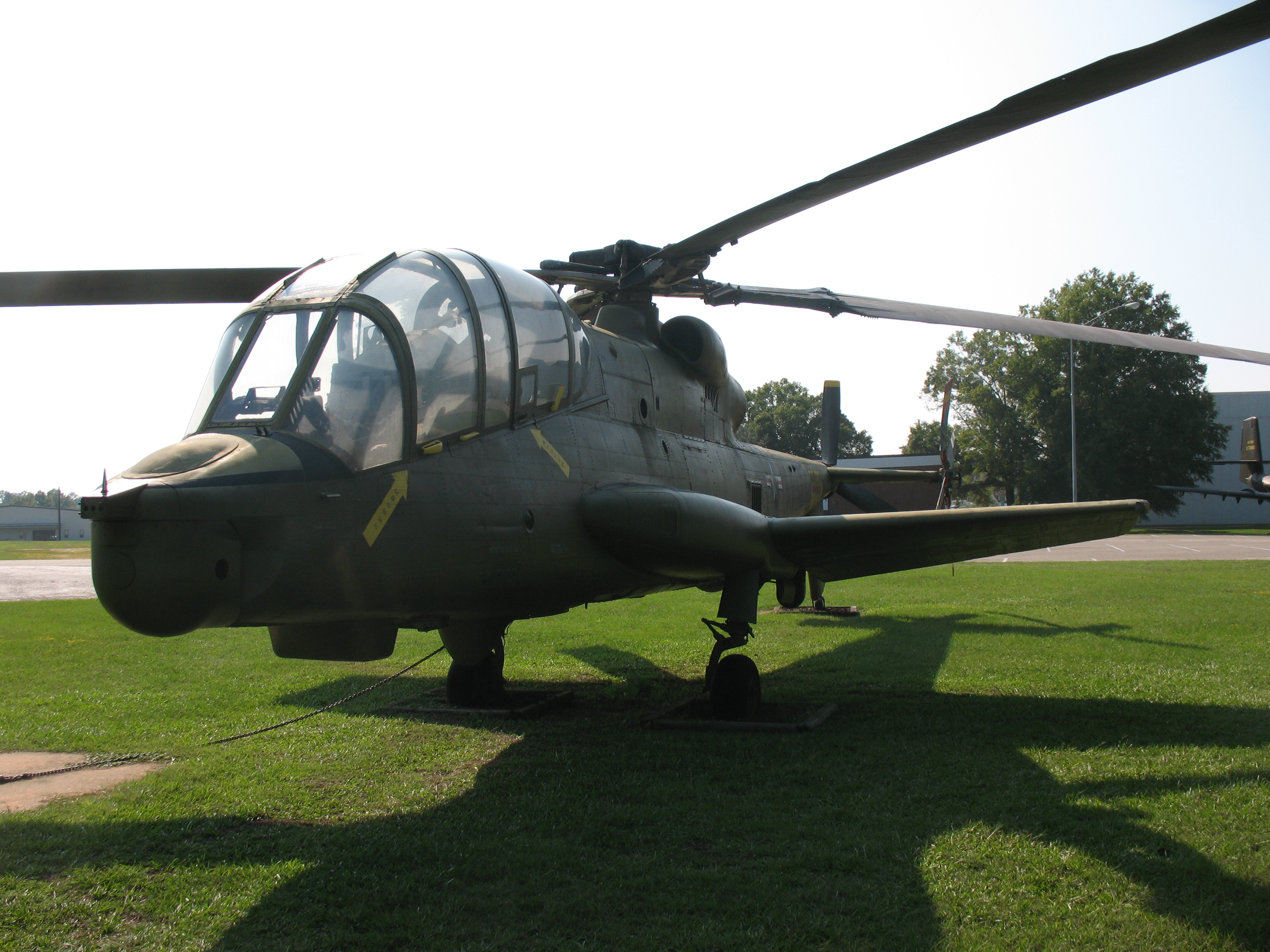
View of AH-56 nose and canopy

The Cheyenne had a two-seat tandem cockpit featuring an advanced navigation and fire control suite. The tandem seating placed the pilot in the rear seat, and the gunner in the front seat. An unusual feature of the gunner's station was that the entire seat, sighting system, and firing controls rotated to keep the gunner facing the same direction as the gun turret being controlled. The gun-sight afforded the gunner direct viewing from the turret by way of a periscope sight. The pilot had a helmet mounted sight system for aiming weapons.

Weapon turrets were mounted at the nose and the middle of aircraft underbelly. The nose turret could rotate +/- 100° from the aircraft's centerline and could mount either a 40 mm (1.57 in) grenade launcher, or a 7.62 mm (0.308 in) minigun. The belly turret included a 30 mm (1.18 in) automatic cannon with 360° of rotation. Mechanical stops prevented the belly turret from aiming at any part of the helicopter.

Six external hardpoints were located along the bottom of the helicopter, with two under each wing and two on the fuselage under the sponsons. The two inner wing hardpoints could carry pods of three BGM-71 TOW anti-tank missiles. 2.75-inch (70 mm) rockets in 7-rocket or 19-rocket launchers could be carried on the four wing hardpoints. The two fuselage mounts were dedicated to carrying external fuel tanks. The wing hardpoints were also plumbed to allow the carriage of additional fuel tanks if required.

== Operational history ==
=== Flight testing ===
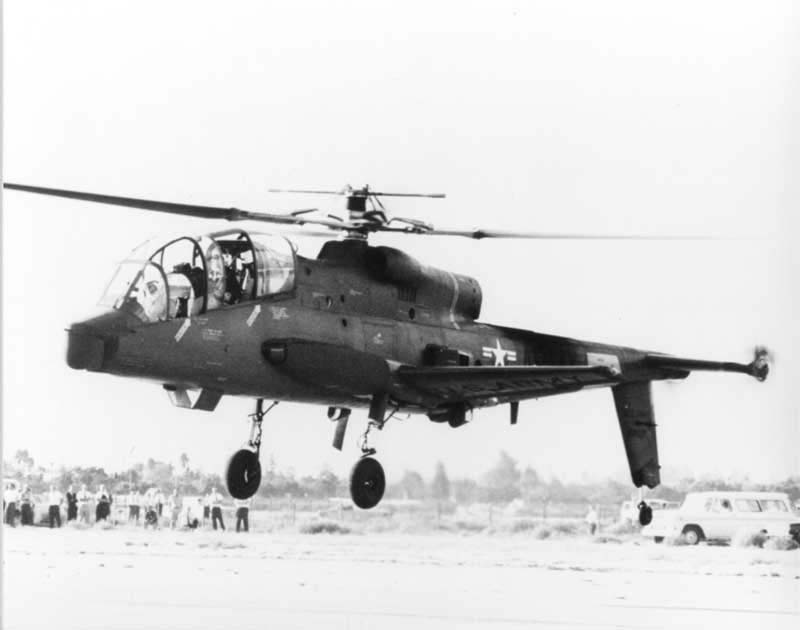
Three-quarter view of AH-56 Cheyenne.

Flight testing began with the first flight of the second AH-56 (s/n 66-8827) in September 1967. During early flight tests, a rotor instability issue was discovered when the aircraft was flying at low altitude in ground effect. As the flight envelope was expanded, this instability and other minor problems were discovered and quickly addressed. (Note: Changes included a stiffer pusher propeller mount, adjustment of the pusher propeller blade natural frequency, and stiffening of the rear cockpit canopy door.)

Lockheed and the Army held a 13-minute demonstration "first flight" for the public at the Van Nuys Airport on 12 December 1967. During the flight, the Cheyenne demonstrated some of the new capabilities brought about by the thrusting propeller; the helicopter could slow down or accelerate without pitching the nose up or down, as well as being able to pitch the nose down or up at a hover, without causing the aircraft to accelerate forwards or backwards. The Cheyenne demonstrated a stationary hover in a 30-knot (35 mph; 56 km/h) crosswind, and at the end of the flight landed on its two forward landing gear, "bowed" to the audience and then gently set the tail landing gear down as it taxied to parking. By March 1968, the AH-56 had established a flight envelope of 170 knots (200 mph; 310 km/h) in forward flight, 25 knots (29 mph; 46 km/h) sidewards, and 20 knots (23 mph; 37 km/h) rearwards.

The project suffered a setback on 12 March 1969, when the rotor on prototype #3 (s/n 66-8828) struck the fuselage and caused the aircraft to crash, killing the pilot, David A. Beil. The accident occurred on a test flight where the pilot was to manipulate the controls to excite 0.5P oscillations (or half-P hop) in the rotor; 0.5P is a vibration that happens once per two main rotor revolutions, where P is the rotor's rotational speed. The accident investigation noted that safety mechanisms on the controls had apparently been disabled for the flight. The investigation concluded that the pilot-induced oscillations had set up a resonant vibration that exceeded the rotor system's ability to compensate. After the investigation, the rotor and control systems were modified to prevent the same problem from occurring again. (Note: The rotor blades and control system were stiffened, the mass of the gyro was increased, and the geometry of the rotor was adjusted.)

=== Production contract canceled ===
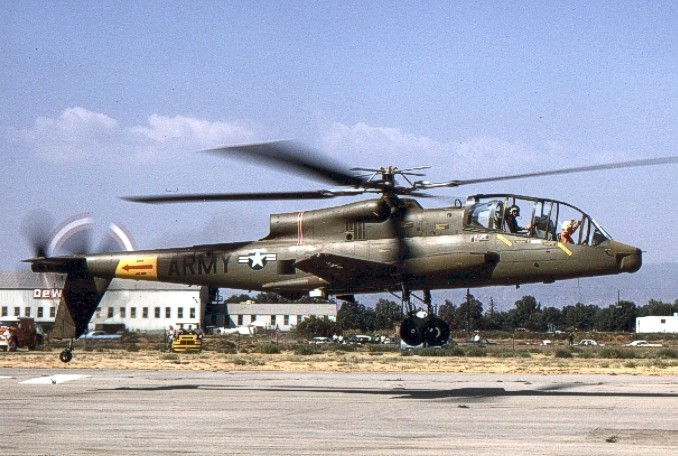
An AH-56 hovering over a helipad

The Army issued a cure-notice (Note: A list of problems that are required to be addressed prior to production.) to Lockheed on 10 April 1969, citing 11 technical problems, and unsatisfactory progress on the program. The main issues were the half-P hop vibration issue, and the aircraft gross weight exceeding program requirements. In response, Lockheed proposed an "improved flight control system" (ICS) to reduce rotor oscillations, and steps for removing excess weight and addressing other minor issues in production helicopters. The Army felt Lockheed's solutions to the cure-notice issues would delay the program and increase costs. Citing Lockheed's inability to meet the production timeline, the Army canceled the AH-56 production contract on 19 May 1969, but retained the development contract in hopes that the issues could be resolved.

In September 1969, Cheyenne prototype #10 (s/n 66-8835) underwent wind tunnel testing at NASA Ames Research Center, to research the half-P hop and drag issues. The engineers did not realize that the fixed mounts used to secure the aircraft in the wind tunnel would not allow the helicopter to move relative to the rotor, as it did in flight. As a result, there was no natural damping of the rotor pitching motion. The remote controllers' lack of sensory feedback from the helicopter compounded the situation. During high speed testing to replicate the half-P hop vibration, the rotor oscillations quickly accelerated out of control and struck the tail boom, resulting in the destructive breakup of the helicopter.

Lockheed worked on modifying the AH-56 design to address the vibration and other issues. (Note: The collective boost system and gyro-to-rotor connection were changed, eliminating the half-P oscillations. Other vibrations were solved by removing weight from rotor head leading and trailing edges, and the rotation of the tail rotor was reversed to improve sidewards flight to the left below 30 knots (35 mph; 56 km/h).) As a precaution, Cheyenne #9 (s/n 66-8834) was fitted with an ejection seat for the pilot after the March accident. The downward firing ejection seat was placed in the forward seat in place of the gunner's station. This prototype would be used for all remaining envelope expansion flights. Prototype #9 also received an upgraded transmission and drivetrain, and a hinged rear canopy in place of the original sliding canopy around 1970. The new transmission allowed the T64-GE-16 turboshaft engine output to be increased from a derated 3,435 to 3,925 hp (2,561 to 2,927 kW). The new canopy eliminated the canopy vibrations.

Cheyenne prototype #6 (s/n 66-8831) began conducting weapons testing at Yuma Proving Ground, Arizona, demonstrating the ability for the gunner and pilot to accurately fire on separate targets on each side on the helicopter. Towards the end of 1970, the Army funded work on TOW missile guidance and night sighting systems. Prototypes #6 and #9 were also tested and evaluated at Yuma Proving Ground from 30 January to 23 December 1971, to determine if stability and control systems were sufficient. Deficiencies were identified in lateral directional stability, uncommanded motion during maneuvering, high vibration, and poor directional control during sidewards flying.

Following the testing at Yuma, prototype #9 received the improved T64-GE-716 engine producing 4,275 shp (3,188 kW) and the planned production version of the ICS system. With these upgrades, the helicopter surpassed its performance requirements. However, under certain conditions stability and control did not completely satisfy the test pilots. Lockheed had studied ways to prevent unstable feedback from the gyro. The solution was to relocate the gyro from the top of the rotor head to below the transmission with flexible connections to the rotor. The pilot's controls were connected to hydraulic servomotors then connected through springs to the gyro. This system prevented rotor vibration forces from transmitting back into the flight controls. It was called the "advanced mechanical control system" (AMCS) and was installed on Cheyenne #7 in 1972 to improve handling and rotor stability.

=== Program demise ===
In 1971, political friction increased between the Army and the Air Force over the close air support (CAS) mission. The Air Force asserted that the Cheyenne would infringe on the Air Force's CAS mission in support of the Army, which had been mandated with the Key West Agreement of 1948. The Department of Defense (DOD) conducted a study that concluded that the Air Force's A-X program, the Marine Corps' Harrier, and the Cheyenne were significantly different that they did not constitute a duplication of capabilities. On 22 October 1971, the Senate Armed Services subcommittee on Tactical Air Power conducted hearings to evaluate the CAS mission and the pending programs. The most damaging testimony for the Army's program came from the commander of the Air Force's Tactical Air Command, General William W. Momyer, who cited helicopter casualty statistics of Operation Lam Son 719.

The Army convened a special task force under General Marks in January 1972, to reevaluate the requirements for an attack helicopter. The purpose of the Marks Board was to develop an "updated and defensible" material needs document. The task force conducted flight evaluations of the AH-56, along with two industry alternatives for comparison: the Bell 309 King Cobra and Sikorsky S-67 Blackhawk. Analysis of the three helicopters determined that the Bell and Sikorsky helicopters could not fulfill the Army's requirements.

The Army also conducted a weapons demonstration for the Senate Armed Services Committee in early 1972, to show off the Cheyenne's firepower and garner support for attack helicopter development. The first TOW missile that was fired in the demonstration failed and went into the ground. The second missile was fired and hit the target. Previously, 130 TOW missiles had been fired without failure, but the failure of the first missile was now linked to perception of the aircraft. In April 1972, the Senate published its report on CAS. The report recommended funding of the Air Force's A-X program, which would become the A-10 Thunderbolt II and limited procurement of the Harrier for the Marine Corps. The report never referred to the Cheyenne by name and only offered a lukewarm recommendation for the Army to continue procurement of attack helicopters, so long as their survivability could be improved.

The Cheyenne program was canceled by the Secretary of the Army on 9 August 1972. The helicopter's large size and inadequate night/all-weather capability were reasons stated by the Army for the cancellation. The Cheyenne's analog and mechanical weapons systems were becoming out of date as new digital systems that were more accurate, faster, and lighter were being developed. The Cheyenne's unit cost had increased and was likely to increase further if new avionics were incorporated. (Note: U.S. Army reports state projected unit costs in $3.2–3.8 million range. Landis and Jenkins (2000) states a $3 million unit cost in 1972.)

On 17 August 1972, the Army initiated the Advanced Attack Helicopter (AAH) program. AAH sought an attack helicopter based on combat experience in Vietnam, with a lower top speed of 145 kn (167 mph; 269 km/h) and twin engines for improved survivability. Lockheed offered the CL-1700, a modified version of the Cheyenne with two engines and omitted the pusher propeller, without success. The AAH program led to the AH-64 Apache, which entered service in the mid-1980s.

After the cancellation, the Army conducted an evaluation of the seventh Cheyenne equipped with the AMCS flight control system. The testing showed the AMCS removed most of the remaining control problems, improved stability, improved handling, and decreased the pilot workload. With the AMCS, the Cheyenne reached a speed of 215 kn (247 mph; 398 km/h) in level flight and in a dive achieved 245 kn (282 mph; 454 km/h); it also demonstrated improved maneuverability at high speeds. Prototype #7 was the last Cheyenne to fly. Lockheed had counted on the Cheyenne to establish itself in the helicopter market with its rigid rotor technology, but the ambitious project was unsuccessful. The firm did not pursue development of another helicopter.

== Civilian variants ==
Lockheed designed three civilian passenger variants of the Cheyenne layout, the CL-1026, CL-1060, and CL-1090. The last two digits represented the number of passenger seats for each design. The 1026 was to seat 30-35 passengers, the 1060 seat sixty passengers, and the 1090 seat ninety. These variants did not progress beyond the initial design stage.

== Surviving aircraft ==
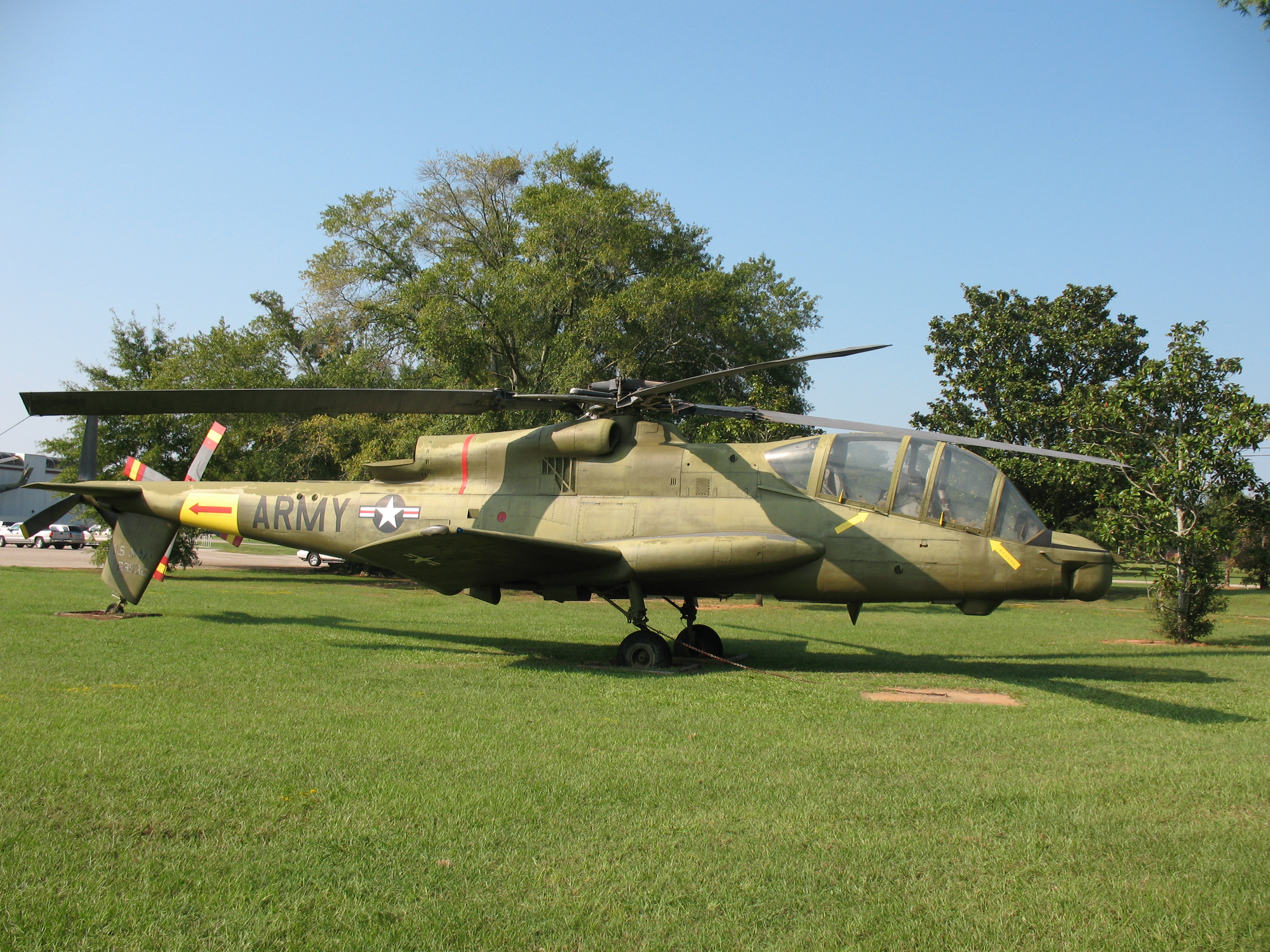
An AH-56 Cheyenne on display in 2007

- No. 2 66-8827 is on display at Fort Polk, Louisiana.
- No. 5 66-8830 is stored at the Army Aviation Museum, Fort Rucker, Alabama.
- No. 6 66-8831 is on display at Fort Campbell, Kentucky/Tennessee
- No. 7 66-8832 is on display at the Army Aviation Museum, Fort Rucker. No longer on outdoor display.

== Specifications (AH-56A) ==
Data from Jane's All the World's Aircraft, 1969–70

General characteristics

- Crew: 2 (pilot in the rear, gunner/co-pilot to the front)
- Length: 54 ft 8 in (16.66 m)
- Height: 13 ft 8.5 in (4.178 m)
- Empty weight: 12,215 lb (5,541 kg)
- Gross weight: 18,300 lb (8,301 kg)
- Max takeoff weight: 25,880 lb (11,739 kg)
- Powerplant: 1 × General Electric T64-GE-16 turboshaft engine, 3,925 shp (2,927 kW)
- Main rotor diameter: 51 ft 3 in (15.62 m)
- Main rotor area: 2,063.2 sq ft (191.68 m^{2})
- Blade section: Root: NACA (4.6)3012 mod; Tip: NACA (0.6)3006 mod
- Rotor systems: 4-bladed main rotor, 4-bladed tail rotor
- Propellers: 3-bladed constant-speed pusher propeller

Performance

- Maximum speed: 212 kn (244 mph, 393 km/h)
- Cruise speed: 195 kn (224 mph, 361 km/h)
- Range: 1,063 nmi (1,223 mi, 1,969 km)
- Service ceiling: 20,000 ft (6,100 m)
- Rate of climb: 3,000 ft/min (15 m/s)

Armament

- Guns:
  - 1 × 40 mm (1.575 in) M129 grenade launcher or 7.62 mm (0.300 in) XM196 minigun in nose turret
  - 1 × 30 mm (1.181 in) XM140 cannon in ventral turret
- Hardpoints: 6 , with provisions to carry combinations of:
  - Rockets: 2.75 in (70 mm) FFA rockets
  - Missiles: BGM-71 TOW missiles

== See also ==
- Johnson-McConnell agreement of 1966
- U.S. Helicopter Armament Subsystems, AH-56 Cheyenne

Related development

- Lockheed XH-51

Aircraft of comparable role, configuration, and era

- Bell AH-1 Cobra
- Kamov V-100
- Piasecki 16H Pathfinder
- Sikorsky S-67 Blackhawk

Related lists

- List of Lockheed aircraft
- List of military aircraft of the United States
- List of rotorcraft
