= Type 93 surface-to-air missile =

Type 93 SAM
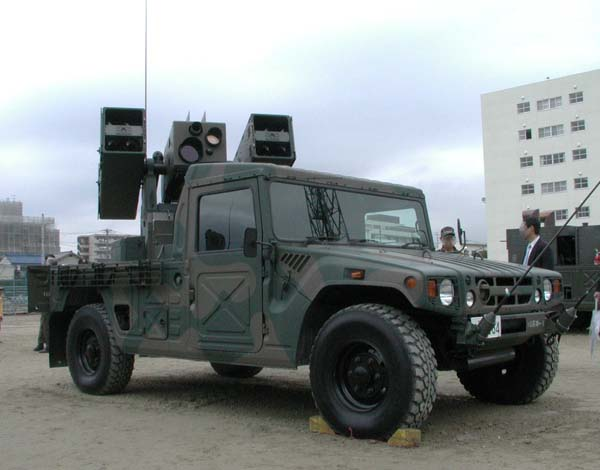
- Type 93 SAM on a Kōkidōsha
- Type: Passive infrared homing missile
- Place of origin: Japan

Service history
- In service: 1993–present
- Used by: Japan

Production history
- Designer: Toshiba Heavy Industries
- Designed: 1991
- Manufacturer: Toshiba Heavy Industries

Specifications
- Mass: 11.5 kg
- Length: 1.43 m
- Diameter: 80 mm
- Engine: Solid Rocket Motor
- Guidance system: Infrared homing

The Type 93 Surface-to-air missile (93式近距離地対空誘導弾, 93shiki-kinkyori-titaikū-yuūdōdan) or Kin-SAM is a surface-to-air missile used by the Japan Ground Self-Defense Force. It is the vehicle-borne version of the Type 91 missile.

It is known in JSDF ranks as the Closed Arrow.

== Description ==
It was first deployed in 1993, due to a need to replace L-90 35mm Anti-Aircraft Twin Cannons in JGSDF service. It is typically deployed on a modified launcher BXD10 Kōkidōsha (military version Toyota Mega Cruiser) with a total of eight missiles ready to fire.

== Operation ==
The Type 93 is a vast improvement over the L-90 as it has the ability to track down and shoot down enemy aircraft due to infrared homing.

== See also ==
- Type 91 surface-to-air missile
