= Bell AH-1 Cobra =

Family of attack helicopters

AH-1 HueyCobra / Cobra
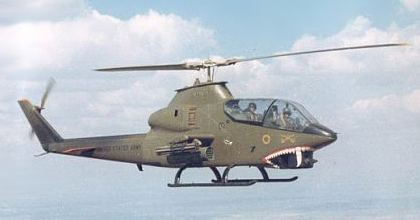
- A Bell AH-1G in flight

General information
- Type: Attack helicopter
- National origin: United States
- Manufacturer: Bell Helicopter
- Status: In service
- Primary users: United States Army (historical) Japan Ground Self-Defense Force; Republic of Korea Army; Royal Jordanian Air Force
- Number built: 1,116

History
- Manufactured: 1967–2019
- Introduction date: 1967
- First flight: 7 September 1965
- Retired: 2001 (US Army)
- Developed from: Bell UH-1 Iroquois
- Variants: Bell AH-1 SeaCobra/SuperCobra; Bell 309 KingCobra

The Bell AH-1 Cobra is a single-engined attack helicopter developed and manufactured by American rotorcraft manufacturer Bell Helicopter. A member of the prolific Huey family, the AH-1 is also referred to as the HueyCobra or Snake.

The AH-1 was developed rapidly as an interim gunship in response to the United States Army's needs in the Vietnam War. It used the same engine, transmission, and rotor system as the Bell UH-1 Iroquois, which had already proven itself to be a capable platform during the conflict, but paired it with a redesigned, narrow fuselage among other features. The original AH-1, being a dedicated attack helicopter, came equipped with stub wings for various weapons, a chin-mounted gun turret, and an armored tandem cockpit, from which it was operated by a pilot and gunner. Its design was shaped to fulfill a need for a dedicated armed escort for transport helicopters, giving the latter greater survivability in contested environments. On 7 September 1965, the Model 209 prototype performed its maiden flight; after rapidly gaining the support of various senior officials, quantity production of the type proceeded rapidly with little revision.

During June 1967, the first examples of the AH-1 entered service with the US Army and were promptly deployed to the Vietnam theater. It commonly provided fire support to friendly ground forces, escorted transport helicopters, and flew in "hunter-killer" teams by pairing with Hughes OH-6A Cayuse scout helicopters. In the Vietnam War alone, the Cobra fleet cumulatively chalked up in excess of one million operational hours; roughly 300 AH-1s were also lost in combat. In addition to the US Army, various other branches of the US military also opted to acquire the type, particularly the United States Marine Corps. Furthermore, numerous export sales were completed with several overseas countries, including Israel, Japan, and Turkey.

For several decades, the AH-1 formed the core of the US Army's attack helicopter fleet, seeing combat in Vietnam, Grenada, Panama, and the Gulf War. In US Army service, the Cobra was progressively replaced by the newer and more capable Boeing AH-64 Apache during the 1990s, with the final examples being withdrawn during 2001. The Israeli Air Force operated the Cobra most prolifically along its land border with Lebanon, using its fleet intensively during the 1982 Lebanon War. Turkish AH-1s have seen regular combat with Kurdish insurgents near Turkey's southern borders. Upgraded versions of the Cobra have been developed, such as the twin-engined AH-1 SeaCobra/SuperCobra and the experimental Bell 309 KingCobra. Furthermore, surplus AH-1 helicopters have been adapted for other uses, including civilian ones; numerous examples have been converted to perform aerial firefighting operations.

== Development ==
=== Background ===
Closely related to the development of the Bell AH-1 is the story of the Bell UH-1 Iroquois transport helicopter—an icon of the Vietnam War and one of the most numerous helicopter types built. The UH-1 made the theory of air cavalry practical, as the new tactics called for US forces to be highly mobile across a wide area. Unlike before, they would not stand and fight long battles, and they would not stay and hold positions. Instead, the plan was that the troops carried by fleets of UH-1 "Hueys" would range across the country, to fight the enemy at times and places of their own choosing.

The massive expansion of American military presence in Vietnam opened a new era of war from the air. The linchpin of US Army tactics was the helicopters, and the protection of those helicopters became a vital role. It became clear that unarmed troop helicopters were vulnerable against ground fire from Viet Cong and North Vietnamese troops, particularly as they approached landing zones to disembark or embark troops. Without friendly support from artillery or ground forces, the only way to pacify a landing zone was from the air, preferably with an aircraft that could closely escort the transport helicopters and loiter over the landing zone as the battle progressed. By 1962, a small number of armed UH-1As were used as escorts, armed with multiple machine guns and rocket mounts. However, these makeshift gunships came with considerable tradeoffs, particularly being barely able to keep up with the troop transports they were intended to protect.

While some officials within the Pentagon, particularly those within the US Army, had recognized the potential value of purpose-built armed rotary aircraft as early as 1962 and were keen to see such a vehicle developed promptly, the issue was complicated in part due to inter-service politics. The United States Air Force (USAF) largely held the opinion that most forms of US military aircraft should be operated only by their service, and that the US Army would be intruding into their domain by developing a complex armed aerial combatant and ought to be largely restricted to transport aircraft. Meanwhile, some US Army officials were concerned that the USAF did not take the close air support mission as seriously as it ought to, and that response times of 30 minutes or more for fixed-wing aircraft would be unacceptable.

=== Iroquois Warrior, Sioux Scout, and AAFSS ===
Bell had been investigating helicopter gunships since the late 1950s, paying particular attention to the Algerian War, in which French forces mounted weapons on helicopters to fight the growing insurgency. The company created a mockup of its D-255 helicopter gunship concept, named "Iroquois Warrior". The Iroquois Warrior was planned to be a purpose-built attack aircraft based on UH-1B components, with a new, slender airframe and a two-seat, tandem cockpit. It featured a grenade launcher in a ball turret on the nose, a 20 mm belly-mounted gun pod, and stub wings for mounting rockets or SS.10 antitank missiles.

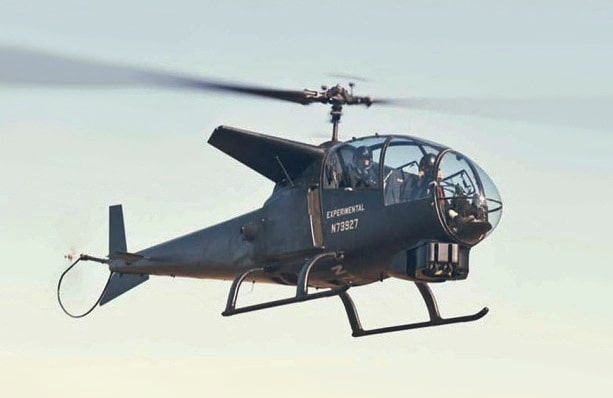
Bell Model 207 Sioux Scout

In June 1962, Bell displayed the mockup to US Army officials, hoping to solicit funding for further development; rival manufacturers issued protests to this approach, alleging that it was an attempt by Bell to circumvent the competitive process. Nevertheless, the Army was interested and awarded Bell a proof-of-concept contract in December 1962. Bell modified a Model 47 into the Model 207 Sioux Scout, which first flew in July 1963. The Sioux Scout had all the key features of a modern attack helicopter, a tandem cockpit, stub wings for weapons, and a chin-mounted gun turret. After evaluating the Sioux Scout in early 1964, the Army was impressed, but also felt that it was undersized, underpowered, and generally not suited for practical operations.

The Army's solution to the shortcomings of the Sioux Scout was to launch the Advanced Aerial Fire Support System (AAFSS) competition. This called for a heavily armed helicopter capable of at least 200 miles per hour (320 km/h). A total of seven companies, including Bell, opted to respond to the AAFSS requirement. The Lockheed AH-56 Cheyenne, a heavy attack helicopter with high-speed capability, emerged out of the AAFSS program. During testing, it proved to be too sophisticated and costly, so ultimately was canceled in 1972 after 10 years of development. In its place, the Advanced Attack Helicopter program was launched. Under this initiative, the Army sought a conventional attack helicopter with a greater level of survivability.

=== Model 209 ===
Despite the Army's preference for the AAFSS program—for which Bell Helicopter was not selected to compete—the company persisted with its own idea of a smaller and lighter gunship, noting that Lockheed had little experience in developing rotorcraft and correctly predicted that it would encounter considerable difficulties. Bell employee Mike Folse played a key role in developing this new gunship, which he intentionally based around the existing UH-1 on the rationale that while the Army could not purchase a completely original helicopter without a formal design competition, the service was able to procure a modification of an aircraft that was already in its inventory without invoking such hurdles. This initiative quickly caught the approval of Bell's senior management team.

In January 1965, Bell elected to invest $1 million (equivalent to $7.78 million in 2025) to proceed with the concept's detailed design. Mating the proven transmission, the "540" rotor system of the UH-1C augmented by a stability-control augmentation system, and the T53 turboshaft engine of the UH-1 with the design philosophy of the Sioux Scout, Bell produced the Model 209. It largely resembled the "Iroquois Warrior" mockup, particularly in its cockpit and tail boom; in broad visual terms,relatively little was shared between the proposed design and the UH-1. Despite appearance, much of the Model 209's major elements, such as the tail rotor and much of the dynamic systems, were identical. Roughly 80% of its components already had existing Huey part numbers.

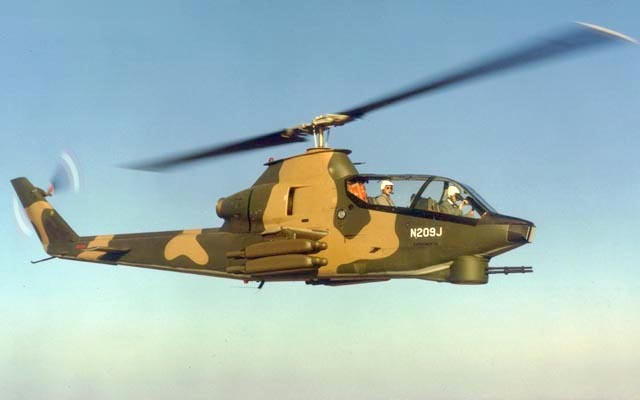
Bell Model 209 prototype of the AH-1 Cobra series, with skids retracted (FAA no. N209J)

On 3 September 1965, Bell rolled out its Model 209 prototype, and four days later, it made its maiden flight, only eight months after the project's go-ahead and slightly under budget. This first flight was witnessed by around 20 US Army officials, the service having had no awareness of the project's existence prior to this, and rapidly drew the government's attention. One early test flight was met with a reportedly enthusiastic visit by US Secretary of Defense Robert McNamara. Bell claimed at this phase of the project that production units could be ready for service within one year.

As the Vietnam War proceeded, pressure accumulated in favor of the Model 209. Attacks on US forces were increasing, and by the end of June 1965, 50,000 US ground troops were already in Vietnam. That year was also the deadline for AAFSS selection, but the program became stuck in technical difficulties and political bickering. The US Army needed an interim gunship for Vietnam, and it approached five separate companies with its request to provide a quick solution. Submissions came in for armed variants of the Boeing-Vertol ACH-47A, Kaman HH-2C Tomahawk, Piasecki 16H Pathfinder, Sikorsky S-61, and the Bell 209.

During April 1966, Bell's submission emerged victorious in an evaluation against the other rival helicopters. The US Army promptly signed the first production contract, ordering an initial batch of 110 aircraft. By the end of the year, rapid follow-on orders had increased this to 500 Cobras. Bell added "Cobra" to the UH-1's Huey nickname to produce its "HueyCobra" name for the 209. The Army applied the Cobra name to its AH-1G designation for the helicopter. The Bell 209 demonstrator was used for the next six years to test weapons and fit of equipment. An additional use for the demonstrator was participating in marketing initiatives. It was also modified to match the AH-1 production standard by the early 1970s. The demonstrator was retired to the Patton Museum at Fort Knox, Kentucky, and converted to roughly its original appearance.

=== Into production ===
The Bell 209 design was modified in several respects for production. The retractable skids were replaced by simpler, fixed skids; this was not due to any recorded design flaw or serviceability, but the landing gear bay was feared to become inundated with mud. Furthermore, a new wide-chord rotor blade was adopted. Bell also decided that a plexiglass canopy should replace the Model 209's armored glass canopy, which was heavy enough to impact performance negatively. The umbrella-shaped dive brake was deleted, having reportedly self-destructed during its first test flight.

Numerous changes of the design were incorporated after the Cobra had entered service. The principal among these was the repositioning of the tail rotor from the helicopter's left side to the right, which facilitated an increase in its effectiveness. The AH-1 was the first U.S. Army helicopter not named for a Native American people since the practice began with the H-13 Sioux and continued with the UH-1 Iroquois, AH-56 Cheyenne, OH-58 Kiowa, and later helicopters.

Within its first decade of service, the US Army had put the original Cobra model through various exercises and operations, which highlighted both the attack helicopter's promise and areas in which it could be improved. By 1972, the US Army openly sought an improved antiarmor capability. Under the Improved Cobra Armament Program, trials of eight AH-1s fitted with TOW missiles were conducted in October 1973. After passing qualification tests the following year, Bell was contracted with upgrading 101 AH-1Gs to the TOW-capable AH-1Q configuration. While early-production examples were not compatible with night-vision goggles, the cockpit instrumentation of later Cobras was altered to facilitate their use.

Further variants of the Cobra promptly were developed, with both new-build models and early production examples being modified to incorporate the improvements. During March 1978, the US Army opted to procure a batch of 100 new-build Cobras that featured a new T-shaped instrument panel, improved composite rotor blades, revised transmission and gearboxes, the M128 helmet-mounted sight, and the M28A3 armament system. A major feature was the adoption of a more powerful version of the T53 engine. Designated AH-1S, the Cobra was upgraded in three stages, culminating with the AH-1F. The AH-1F integrated numerous countermeasures, including an infrared jammer, a radar jammer, and a hot plume exhaust suppressor.

The U.S. Marine Corps (USMC) quickly became interested in the Cobra, opting to order an improved twin-engined version in 1968 under the designation AH-1J. During the early 1970s, the USMC proceeded to order an upgraded model, the AH-1T, which featured dynamic elements derived from the abortive Bell 309 KingCobra; as such, it featured a longer fuselage and tailboom. These dynamic changes were combined with the adoption of heavier armaments, which provided the USMC with an effective antiarmor capacity, unlike the preceding model. The USMC's interest in the Cobra would lead to the production of more twin-engined variants of the helicopter.

== Design ==
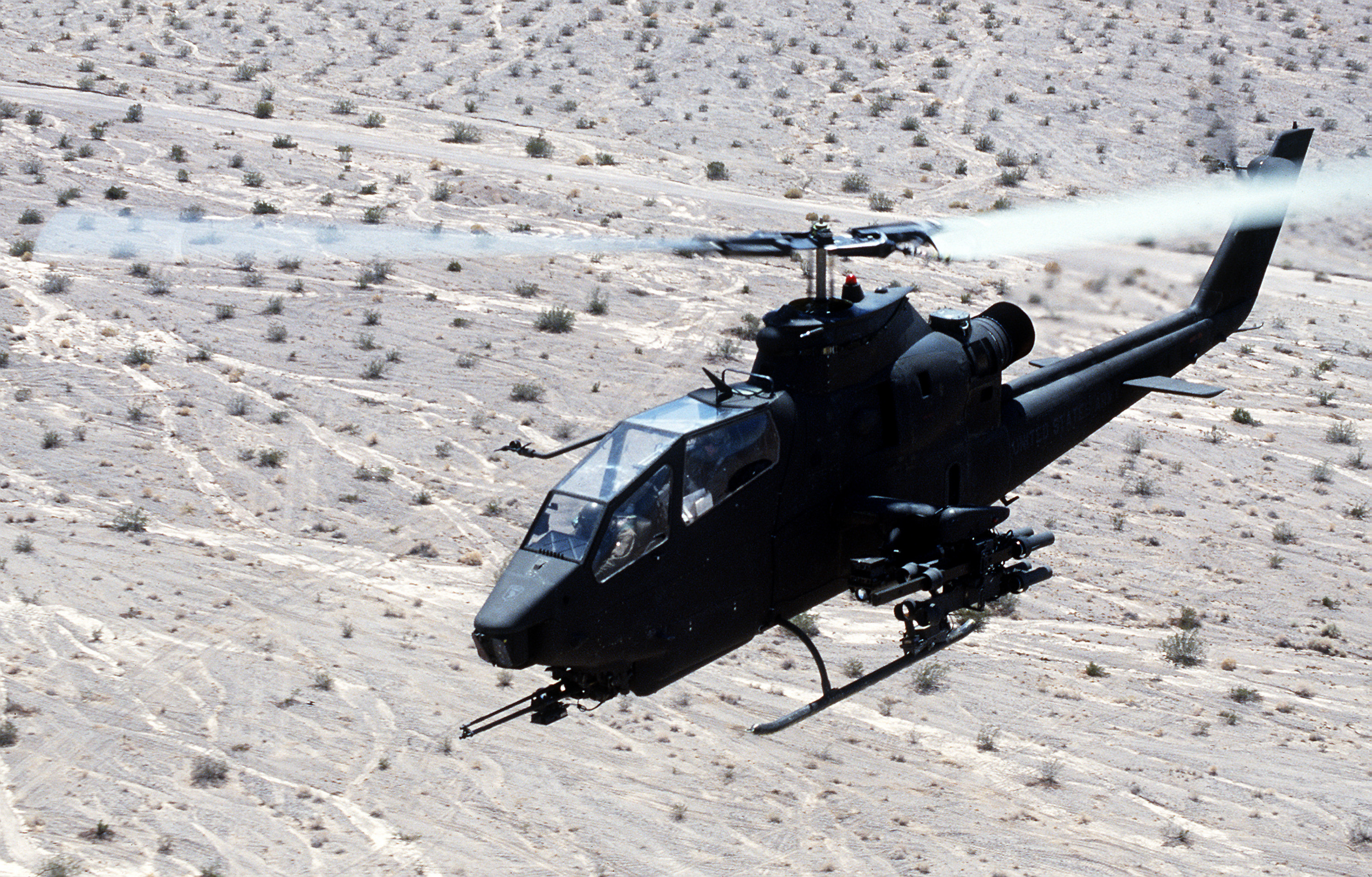
An AH-1S Cobra, 1986

The Bell AH-1 Cobra is a dedicated attack helicopter, built to provide close air support and to escort friendly troop transports. The visual design of the Cobra intentionally was made to be sleek and be akin to that of a jet fighter. Aviation author Stanley McGowen observed that its appearance differed radically from any prior rotorcraft designed by Bell, possessing a relatively narrow fuselage and a then-unusual cockpit arrangement. This cockpit was covered by a large fighter-like canopy and its occupants protected by armor, including tempered-steel seats and personal body armor. It was operated by both a pilot and gunner, who were seated in a stepped, tandem arrangement in which the commander was placed in the rear seat, while the gunner occupied the forward position. This forward position provided a higher level of visibility compared to that of the rear seat. Both positions were provided with flying controls, while both crew typically were certified pilots, enabling control of the Cobra to be exchanged quickly through the course of the mission.

Many of the Cobra's armaments could be installed upon the multiple hardpoints that were attached to the stub wings set on either side of the fuselage. In comparison to armed UH-1s, the Cobra typically could carry twice as much ammunition and arrive on station in half the time; it also had triple the loiter time, which enabled the type to arrive in a designated landing zone ahead of transport helicopters to clear it, provide support fire while they are present, and to continue fighting as they withdraw. The slim profile of the helicopter allegedly provided defensive benefits by making it harder for opponents to hit it accurately with small-arms fire, although man-portable air-defense system did prove to be effective against the Cobra. Particularly vulnerable areas included the tail-rotor driveshaft and the main transmission.

Typically, the Cobra would avoid hovering at any point in an active engagement; instead, emphasis was placed on maintaining speed and mobility. The gunner often fired the chin-mounted cannon with the intention of suppressing hostile targets between barrages of 2.75-inch rockets, held in pods on the stub wings, which were fired by the back-seater. Cobras usually did not operate alone; instead, two or more would be dispatched and teamwork was encouraged, leading to hunter-killer tactics being used to flush out and eliminate ground targets. Pairings with other helicopters, such as the Bell OH-58 Kiowa scout helicopter, were also common occurrences. Radio communications were handled by the gunner. Regardless of mission profile, low-altitude flying was commonplace.

== Operational history ==
=== United States ===
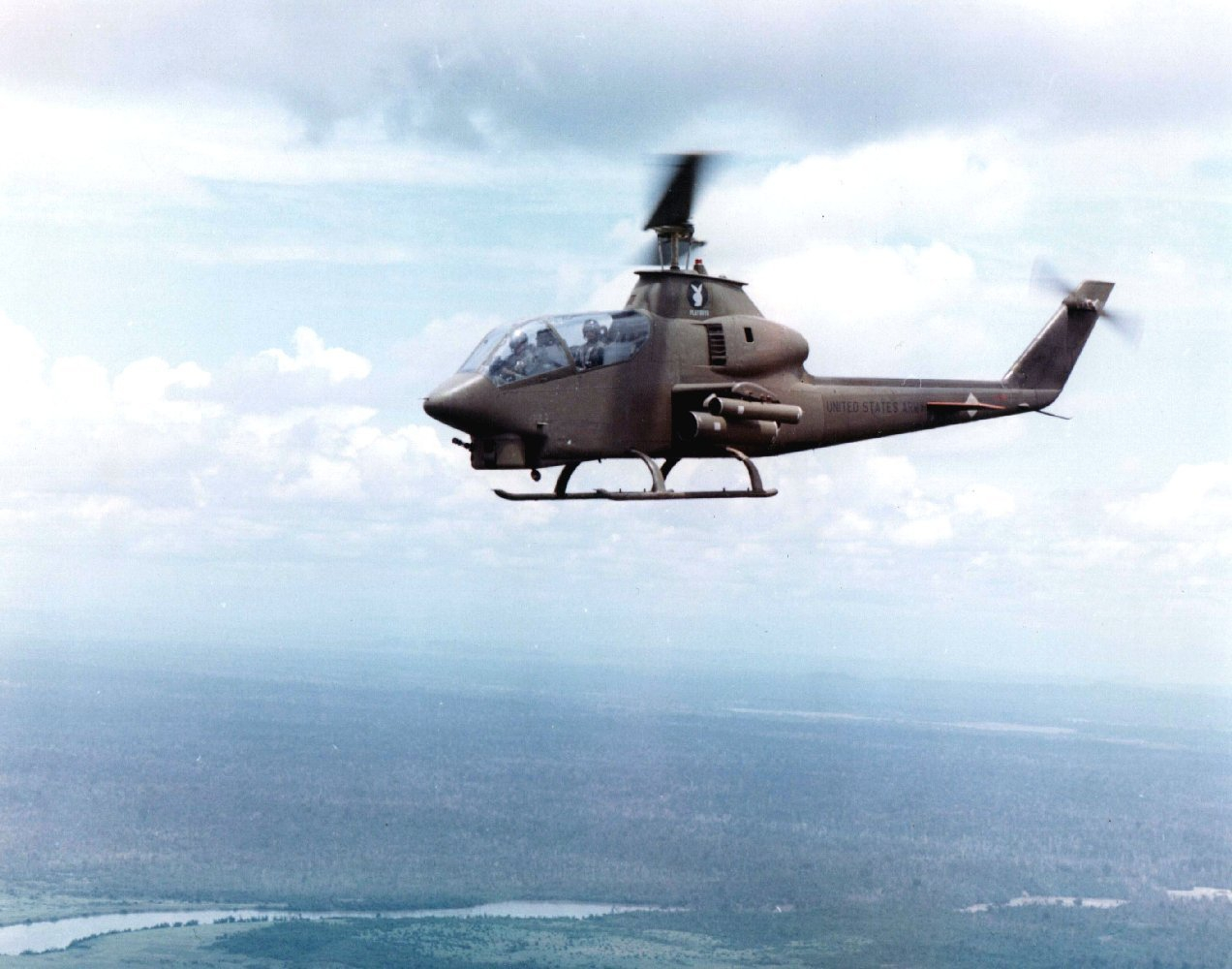
Bell AH-1G over Vietnam

By June 1967, the first AH-1G HueyCobras had been delivered. Originally designated as UH-1H, the "A" for attack designation was soon adopted and when the improved UH-1D became the UH-1H, the HueyCobra became the AH-1G. The AH-1 was initially considered a variant of the H-1 line, resulting in the G series letter.

The first six AH-1s arrived at Bien Hoa Air Base, South Vietnam, on 30 August 1967 for combat testing by the U.S. Army Cobra New Equipment Training Team. On 4 September, the type scored its first combat kill by sinking a sampan boat, killing four Viet Cong. The first AH-1 unit, the 334th Assault Helicopter Company, was declared operational on 6 October 1967. The Army operated the Cobra continuously up to the U.S. withdrawal from South Vietnam in 1973. Typically, the AH-1 provided fire support for ground forces and escorted transport helicopters, in addition to other roles, including aerial rocket artillery battalions in the two Airmobile divisions. They also formed "hunter killer" teams by pairing with OH-6A Cayuse scout helicopters; a team normally comprised a single OH-6 flying slow and low to find enemy forces. If the OH-6 drew fire, the Cobra could strike at the then-revealed enemy.

US Army AH-1G Cobra overview

On 12 September 1968, Capt. Ronald Fogleman was flying an F-100 Super Sabre when the aircraft was shot down and he ejected 200 miles (320 km) north of Bien Hoa. Fogleman became the only pilot to be rescued by holding on to an Army AH-1G's deployed gun-panel door. Bell built 1,116 AH-1Gs for the US Army between 1967 and 1973, and the Cobras chalked up over a million operational hours in Vietnam; the number of Cobras in service peaked at 1,081. In 1971 during Operation Lam Son 719 in Southeastern Laos, 26 U.S. Army AH-1Gs were destroyed and 158 sustained some level of damage. Out of nearly 1,110 AH-1s that were delivered between 1967 and 1973, about 300 were lost to a combination of combat and accidents during the conflict. Around one-third of this number were operational or noncombat losses.

The USMC also operated the AH-1G Cobra in Vietnam for a short time before acquiring the twin-engined AH-1J Cobras. The AH-1Gs had been adopted by the Marines as an interim measure, a total of 38 helicopters having been transferred from the U.S. Army to the USMC in 1969.

During Operation Urgent Fury, the invasion of Grenada in 1983, several Marine AH-1T SeaCobras and Army AH-1S Cobras were deployed to fly close air support and helicopter escort missions. On the first day of the invasion, two of the four AH-1Ts involved were lost to antiaircraft fire in the attack on Fort Frederick.

During 1989, Army Cobras participated in Operation Just Cause, the U.S. invasion of Panama. It operated alongside its eventual successor in US Army service, the Boeing AH-64 Apache, for the first time during the combat in Panama.

During Operations Desert Shield and Desert Storm in the Gulf War (1990–91), both the Cobras and SuperCobras deployed in a support role. The USMC deployed 91 AH-1W SuperCobras, while the US Army operated 140 AH-1 Cobras of various models in the theater; these were typically operated from dispersed forward-operating bases in close proximity to Saudi Arabia's border with Iraq. Three AH-1s were lost in accidents during fighting and afterward. Cobras successfully destroyed large numbers of Iraqi armored vehicles and various other targets during the intense fighting of the conflict.

US Cobras were deployed in further operations across the 1990s. Army Cobras provided support for the US humanitarian intervention during Operation Restore Hope in Somalia in 1993. They were also employed during the US invasion of Haiti in 1994.

During the 1990s, the US Army gradually phased out its Cobra fleet, completely retiring the type from active service in March 1999. The service, which had long sought a more capable successor to the Cobra, had procured a large fleet of AH-64 Apaches since receiving the first example of the type during early 1984. The withdrawn AH-1s were typically offered to other potential operators, usually NATO allies. The Army retired the AH-1 from its reserves in September 2001. The retired AH-1s were then disposed of, often through sales to overseas customers; the final portion of the fleet was liquidated in 2010. Some were also given to the USDA's Forest Service. The USMC retired the AH-1W SuperCobra in 2020, and continues to operate the AH-1Z Viper.

=== Israel ===
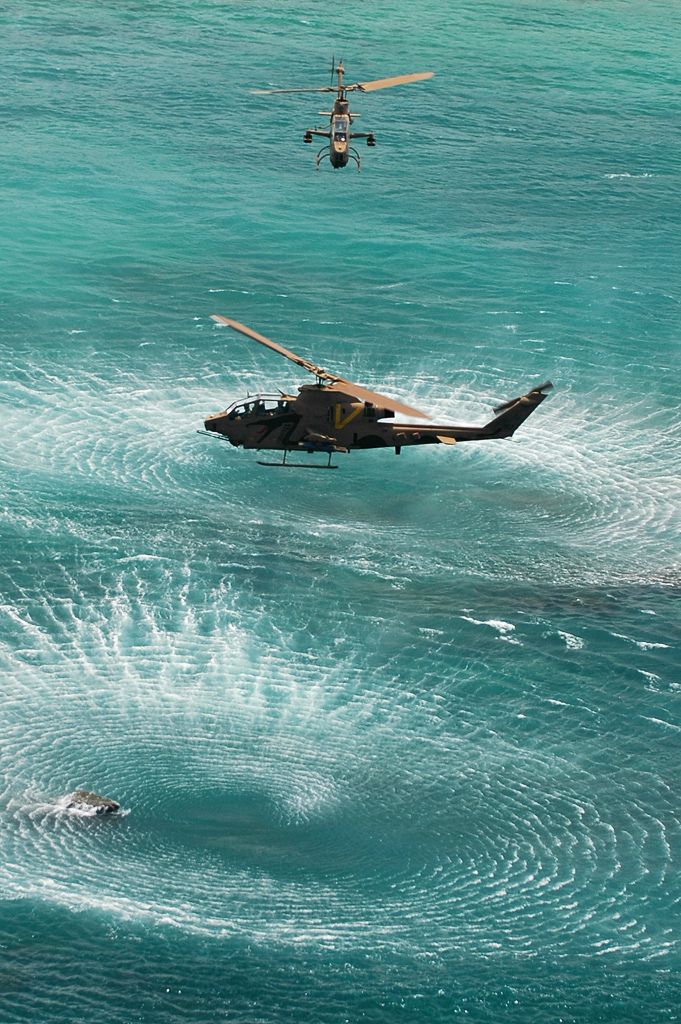
Israeli Air Force Tzefa helicopters

Israel was an early export customer for the Cobra, purchasing six AH-1Gs from the US Army. The government was keen to procure a capable attack helicopter as recent combat in the Yom-Kippur War had shown a need for a capable platform for countering enemy armor. The type was operated by the Israeli Air Force (IAF), with the First Attack Helicopter Squadron formally commencing on 1 December 1977. The IAAF named the type as the Tzefa (Hebrew: צפע, for viper).

On 9 May 1979, the IAF's Cobras performed their first attack, firing four Orev missiles at a house near Tyre, Lebanon, that was occupied by militants. Israel's fleet of Cobras was particularly active on the Lebanon front, having participated in the fighting there for in excess of 20 years. They were used intensively during the 1982 Lebanon War to destroy Syrian armor and fortifications alike, being reportedly responsible for the destruction of dozens of Syrian ground vehicles. In one operation alone, two IAF Cobras destroyed three enemy tanks and one truck. Based upon its performance in the conflict, the IAF decided to remove the rocket pods and increase the amount of ammunition carried for the cannon, instead. Other operational changes included a greater emphasis on co-operation with ground units to avoid friendly-fire incidents.

Largely due to a US embargo that prevented the purchase of further Cobras, Israel procured alternative platforms, instead, including around 20 McDonnell Douglas MD 500 Defenders in late 1979. Between 1983 and 1985, by which time the embargo had been lifted, 24 new Cobras were purchased; the expanded fleet enabled the creation of a second squadron, known as the Fighting Family Squadron, on 1 June 1985. During 1990, the IAF received its first Boeing AH-64 Apache attack helicopters, having acquired a fleet of 42 by 2000. At the time of the Apache's procurement, considerable political controversy existed over the IAF's decision to overlook upgrades to its existing Cobra fleet in favor of acquiring an entirely separate model of attack helicopter.

Throughout the 1980s and 1990s, the Cobras continued to play a role in major operations against groups such as Hezbollah, including operations Accountability and Grapes of Wrath, in southern Lebanon. During August 1996, the IAF's Cobra fleet was expanded yet again with 14 surplus US Army AH-1F Cobras being acquired, some of which were used by the frontline squadrons, while others were operated exclusively for flight-training purposes. During the 2000s, the Cobra's precision strike capability was bolstered by the adoption of the Spike missile.

During late 2013, Israel opted to retire the last of its 33 AH-1 Cobras from frontline service, largely due to budget cuts. Its role was taken up entirely by the IAF's squadrons of AH-64 attack helicopters, while an extensive fleet of unmanned aerial vehicles (UAVs) took over the role of patrolling combat zones. The Cobra fleet was considerably older than the Apaches, which contributed to several fatal crashes of the type. The Cobras were also more expensive to maintain than UAVs and their use exposed pilots to attacks from man-portable air-defense systems operated by guerrilla groups. Around the same time frame, the IAF also pursued upgrades to its AH-64 fleet. In late 2014, Israel transferred 16 of the recently withdrawn Cobras to the Royal Jordanian Air Force to bolster the numbers of their existing fleet.

=== Japan ===
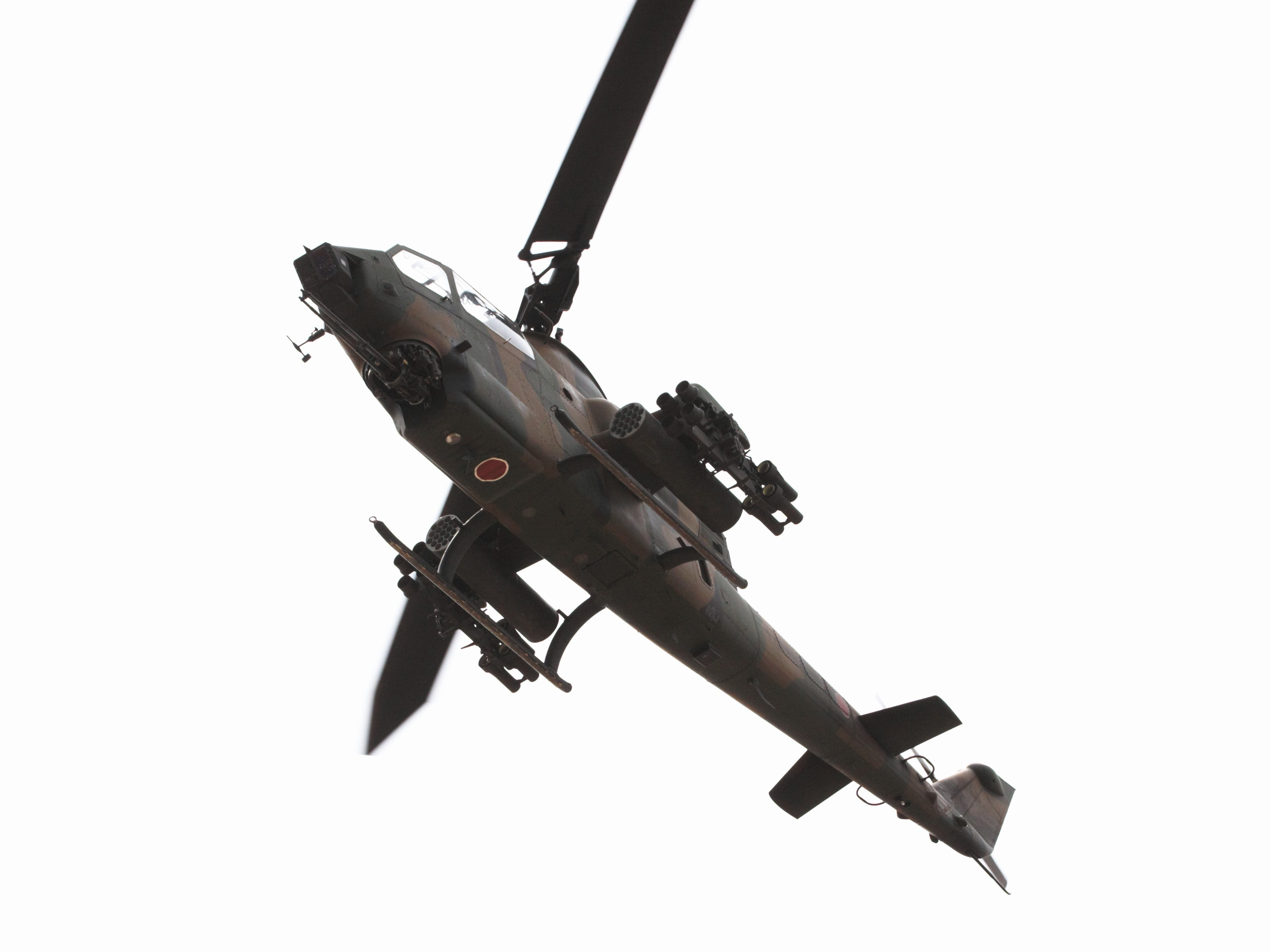
Japan Ground Self-Defense Force AH-1S Cobra, April 2014

Japan manufactured 89 AH-1S Cobras under license by Fuji Heavy Industries from 1984 to 2000. They are used by the Japan Ground Self-Defense Force and are Step 3 models, which are roughly the equivalent to the US Army's AH-1Fs. The engine is the T53-K-703 turboshaft, which Kawasaki Heavy Industries produced under license. During the 2010s, Japan was examining options for procuring a fleet of new rotorcraft to replace its aging Cobras; the replacement helicopter has been specified to be optimized for marine use and able to operate from expeditionary airstrips or sea bases, and that between 30 and 50 such craft would be purchased.

In December 2022, the Japanese government decided to replace 47 AH-1S, 12 AH-64D, 33 OH-1s, and 26 U-125As with UAVs. Japan planned to increase its defense budget from 1.24% of GDP in fiscal 2021 to around 2.0% within 10 years and has decided to retire these helicopters and aircraft as part of an effort to spend its defense budget efficiently.

=== Jordan ===
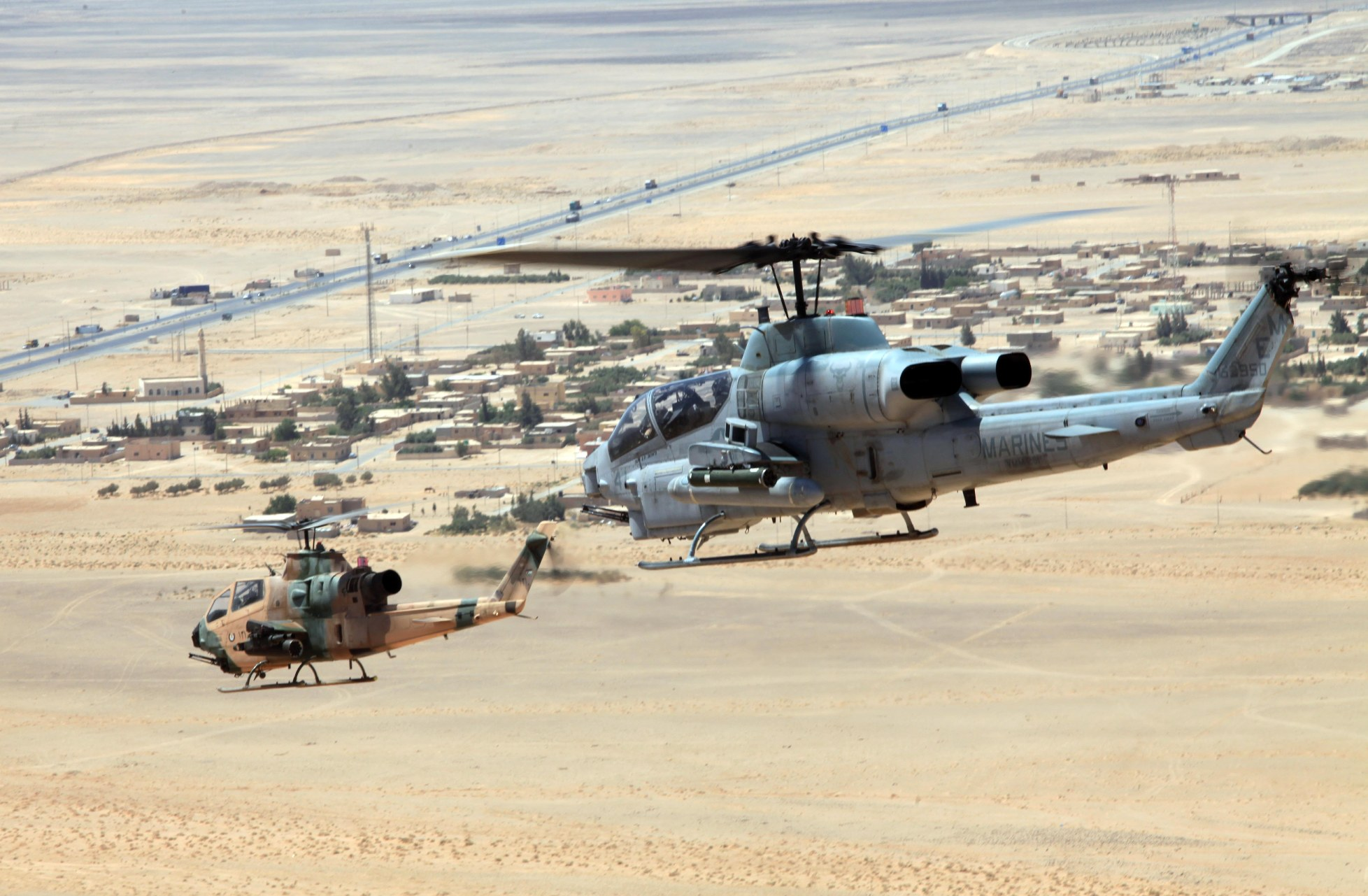
Royal Jordanian Air Force AH-1F Cobra in May 2012, next to a USMC AH-1W Cobra

Jordan obtained an initial batch of 24 AH-1Fs during the late 1980s. In 2001, nine additional ex-US Army Cobras were acquired to supplement the fleet. During 2010, Jordan transferred 16 AH-1F helicopters to Pakistan under a US-sponsored support program that provided Islamabad with 40 AH-1 refurbished helicopters.

In late 2014, Israel and Jordan came to an agreement under which the former transferred 16 ex-IAF Cobras to the Royal Jordanian Air Force. The deal was publicly stated to be for the purpose of increasing border security, which was viewed as a pressing concern of both nations due to the threats posed by Islamic State militants, as well as by other insurgent groups, at that time.

The Royal Jordanian Air Force has at least one squadron of Cobras in service and is supposed to have used them in combat in Iraq and Syria.

=== Turkey ===
Turkey bought 10 AH-1Ws in the early 1990s, and supplemented them with 32 ex-US Army Cobras. These additional units included several TAH-1P trainers, while the majority were brought up to the AH-1F standard. During the 2010s, Turkish Cobras have repeatedly seen combat in operations against Kurdish insurgents around Turkey's borders with both Syria and Iraq. Two Cobras were reportedly lost to enemy fire during these operations. Amid the 2016 Turkish coup d'état attempt, Turkish Cobras were alleged to have fired upon several police vehicles.

=== Pakistan ===
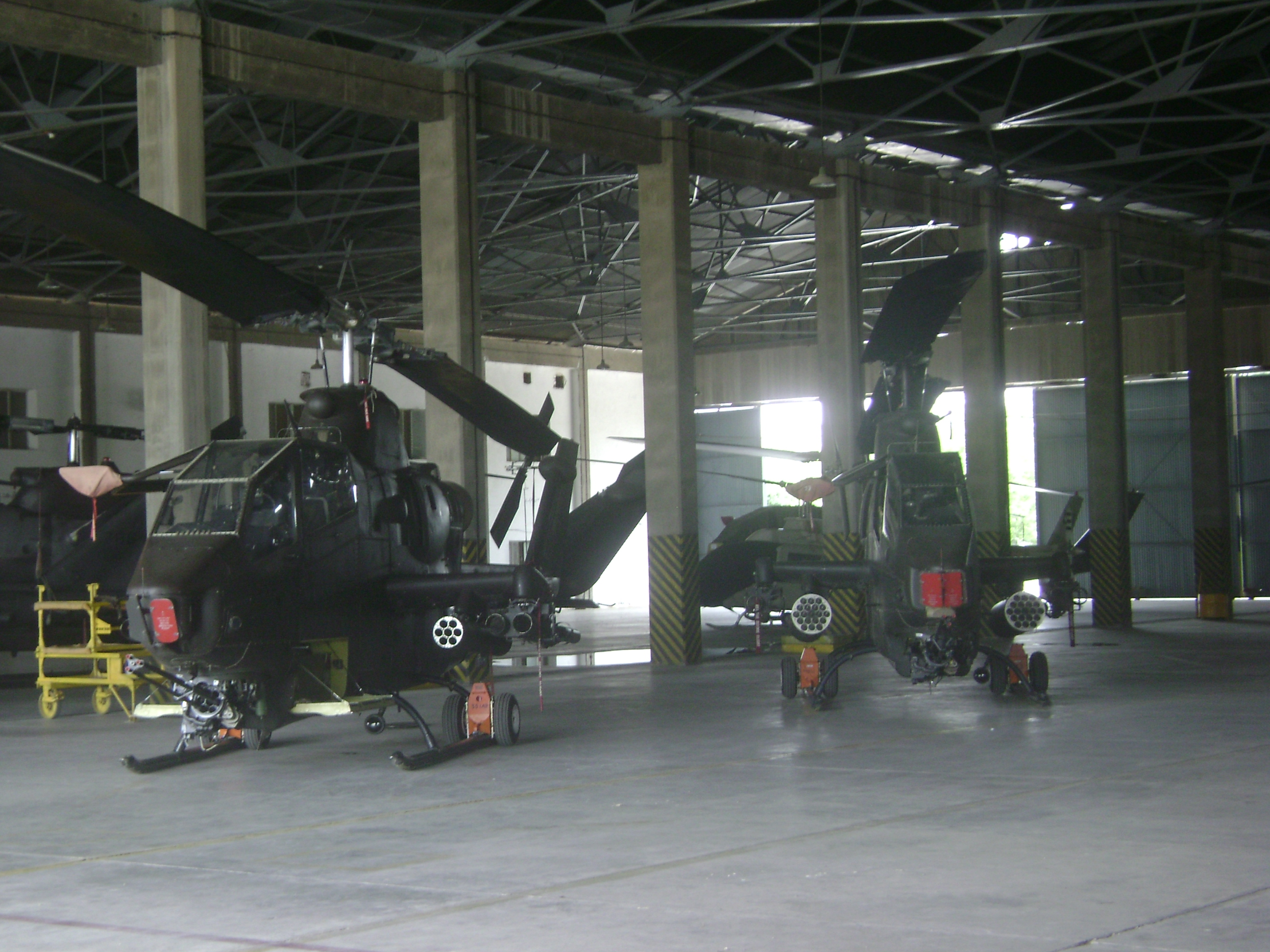
Two Pakistan Army AH-1 Cobra helicopters at Multan airbase

Between 1985 and 1986, Pakistan was supplied with an initial batch of 20 AH-1S gunships by the US (on 9 January 1985, the first batch of 10 AH-1F Cobra helicopters was delivered, and in October 1986, the second batch of 10 was delivered to Pakistan.); these were later upgraded with the C-NITE thermal imaging package. Operated by Pakistan Army Aviation, the service first used Cobra overseas in Somalia during the United Nations Operation in Somalia II, where a single squadron was deployed in 1994. Pakistani Cobras subsequently saw action in Sierra Leone.

By 2013, Pakistan reportedly operated a fleet of 35 AH-1F helicopters. Maintaining these aircraft has been difficult, but possible through commercial channels. Additionally, the US government provided $750,000 (~$1.02 million in 2025) through 2013 to update the existing AH-1F/S Cobra fleet. However, controversy over how much of this funding has actually been spent on Pakistan's Cobras has also been present throughout the 2010s. Turkey has also become a key supplier of spare parts for the Cobra, often free of cost, to Pakistan. During the 2010s, Pakistan lost three aircraft in separate incidents.

Pakistan repeatedly sought the Bell AH-1W SuperCobra from the US to supplement and replace its current AH-1 Cobras. Attempts to acquire the AH-1Z Viper or AH-64E Apache from the US were rejected, so Pakistan turned to buying other foreign attack helicopters. Possible candidates have included the Turkish T129, the Chinese CAIC Z-10, and the Russian Mi-35 Hind. In November 2014, Russia approved the sale of Mi-35M helicopters to Pakistan. In April 2015, China delivered three Z-10s to Pakistan. During the same month, the US Department of State approved the sale of 15 AH-1Zs and associated equipment to Pakistan. During October 2017, the T129 was also reported to be a contender for further orders.

=== The Philippines ===
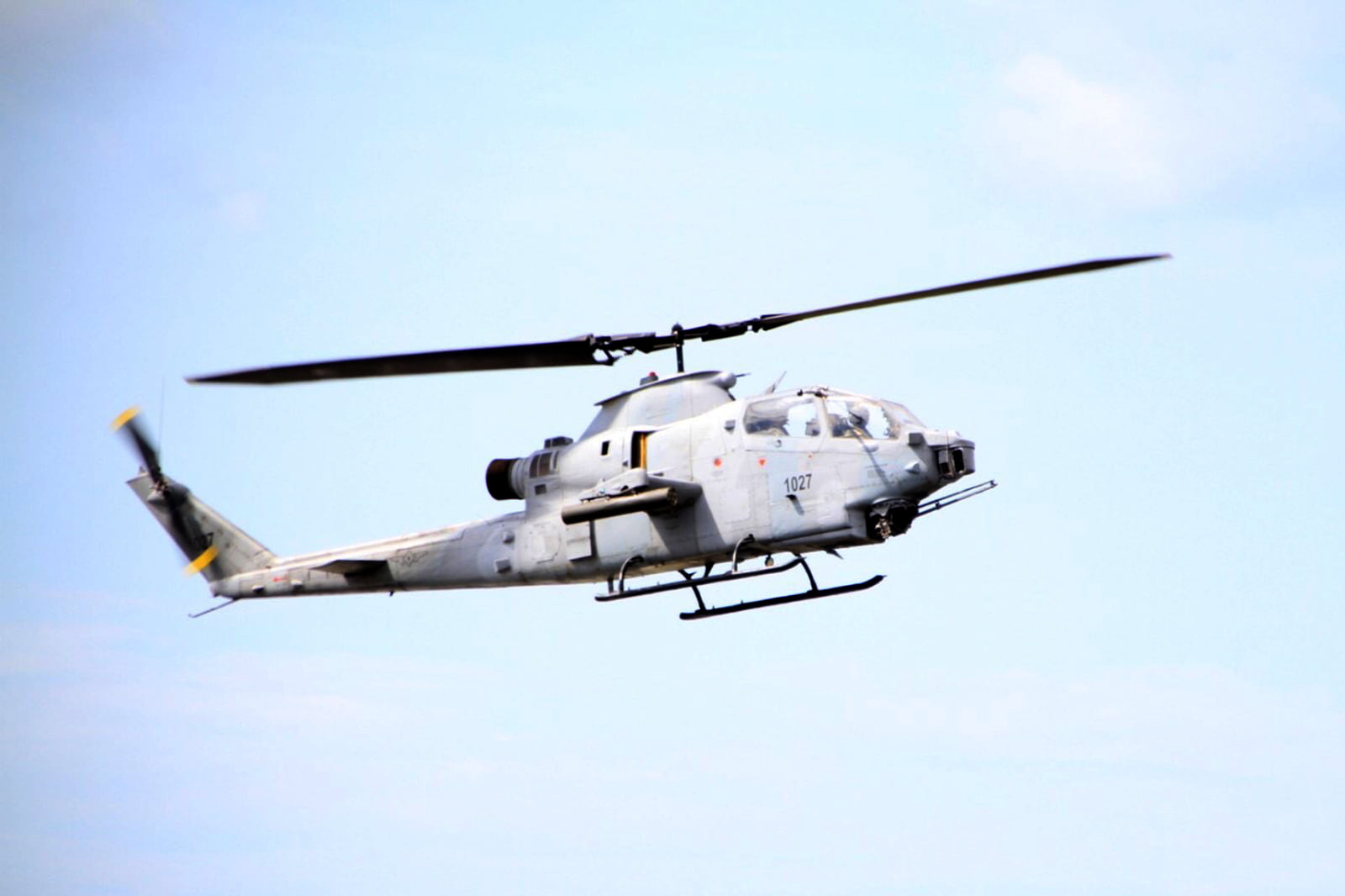
Philippine Air Force Bell AH-1S

The Jordanian government offered to provide up to four surplus AH-1F/S Cobras to the Philippines for counterterrorism operations. The offer was later reduced to two units, which the Philippine government accepted. On 26 November 2019, an Antonov An-124 airlifter carried the two Bell AH-1S Cobras from Jordan to Clark International Airport/Clark Air Base. The helicopters are reportedly painted in a light grey livery similar to the paint scheme of the PAF's AgustaWestland AW109E armed helicopters.

The helicopters were used as training and transition platforms as the PAF prepares to acquire new purpose-built attack helicopters, while also used for secondary ground support and attack roles. PAF AH-1s conducted airstrikes on communist insurgent positions as part of OPLAN "Wrath of Polaris 2" conducted by Joint Task Force Tala in Gonzaga, Cagayan, as well as other airstrikes against terrorist forces.

The AH-1S Cobras were retired from service on 28 December 2024 after a few years in service, as parts had become difficult to obtain.

=== Civilian operators ===
In 2003, the US Forest Service acquired 25 retired AH-1Fs from the US Army. These have been designated Bell 209 and are being converted into Firewatch Cobras with infrared and low-light sensors and systems for real-time fire monitoring. The last two Firewatch Cobras were retired in October 2021.

The Florida Division of Forestry also acquired three AH-1Ps from the US Army. These are called Bell 209 "Firesnakes" and are equipped to carry a water/fire retardant system.

== Variants ==
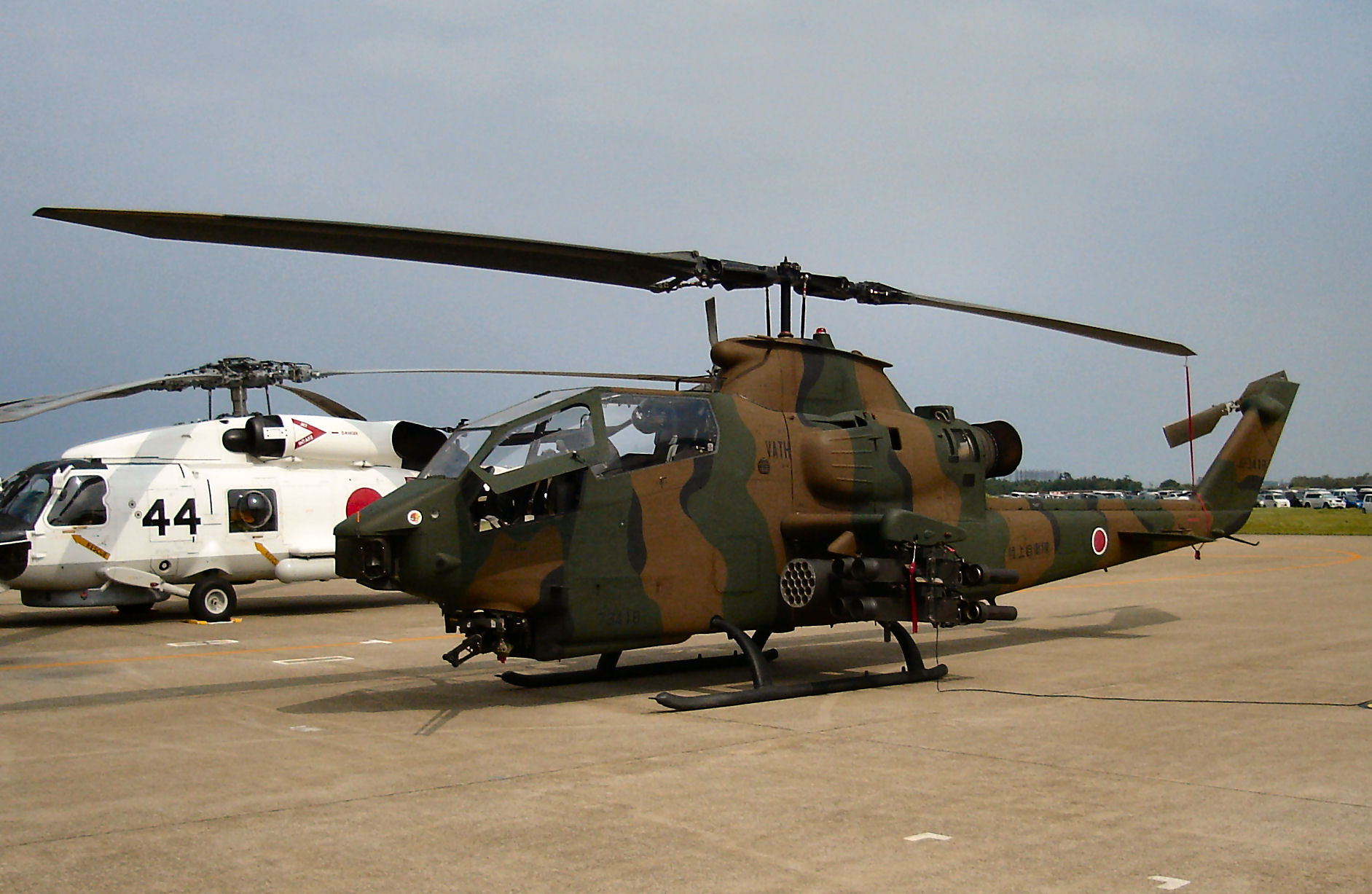
Japan Ground Self-Defense Force AH-1S

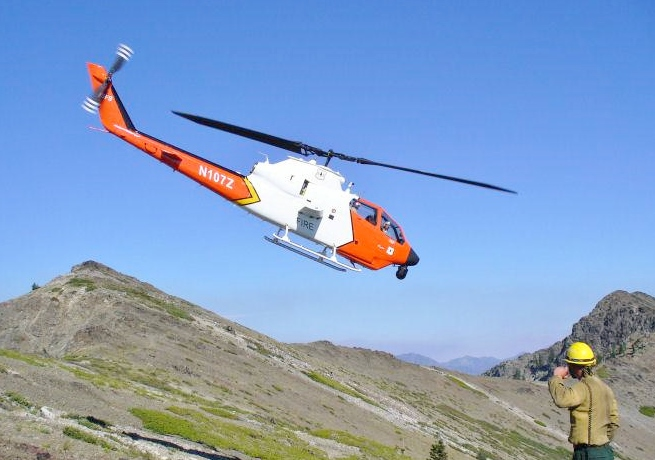
U.S. Forest Service Bell 209 on the Bar Complex Fire in California

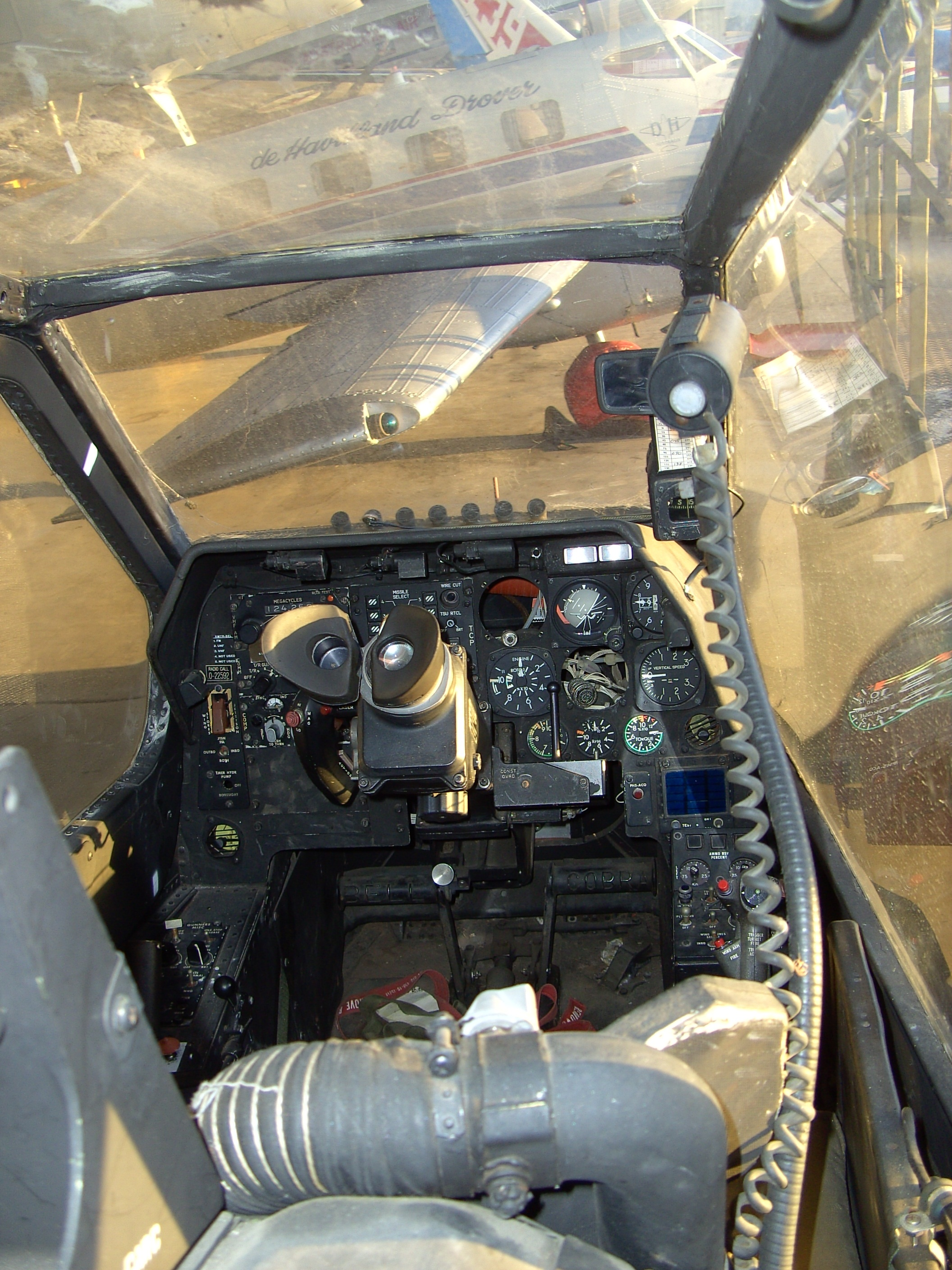
AH-1P front cockpit (restoration)

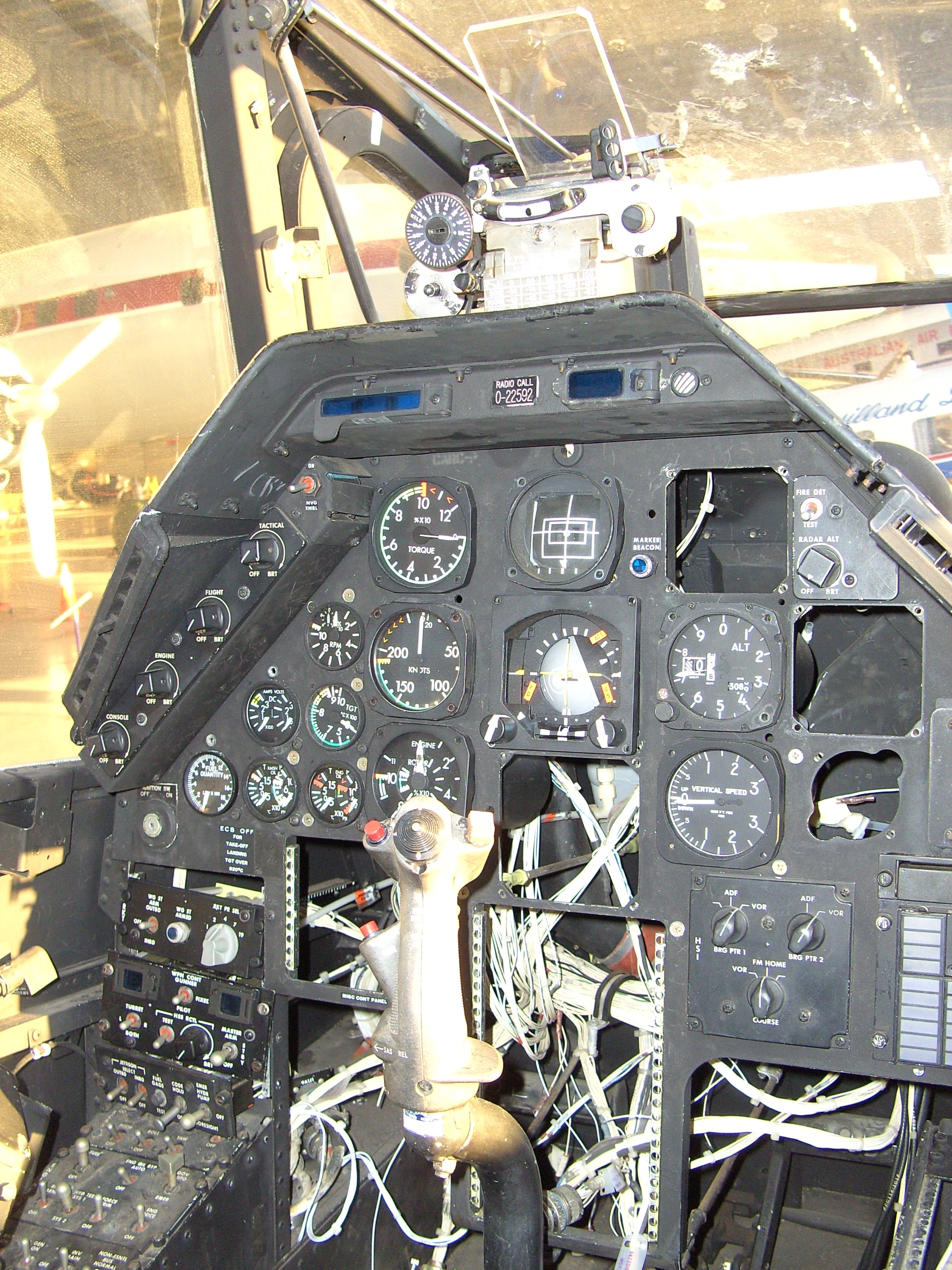
AH-1P rear cockpit (restoration)

=== Single-engine ===
Bell 209
Original AH-1G prototype with retractable skid landing gear. This model number is also used by the FAA for the civilian registration of former U.S. Army AH-1s used in firefighting service.

AH-1G HueyCobra
Initial 1966 production model gunship for the U.S. Army, with one 1,400 shp (1,000 kW) Avco Lycoming T53-13 turboshaft.
JAH-1G HueyCobra
One helicopter for armament testing including Hellfire missiles and multi-barrel cannon.
TH-1G HueyCobra
Two-seat dual-control trainer.
Z.14 HueyCobra
The Spanish Navy purchased eight new-build AH-1Gs, designating the type the "Z-14". These were equipped with the M35 20 mm cannon system, and were used to support coastal patrol boats. Four of these were lost in accidents. The remaining helicopters were retired in 1985 with three sent back to the US, and one kept in storage in Spain.
YAH-1Q
Eight AH-1Gs with XM26 Telescopic Sight Unit (TSU) and two M56 TOW 4-pack launchers.
AH-1Q HueyCobra
Equipped with the M65 TOW/Cobra missile subsystem, M65 Telescopic Sight Unit (TSU), and M73 Reflex sight. All future versions will be equipped with the TSU and be equipped to fire the TOW missile subsystem.
YAH-1R
AH-1G powered by a T53-L-703 engine without TOW system.

YAH-1S
AH-1Q upgrade and TOW system.
AH-1S
The baseline AH-1S is an AH-1Q upgraded with a 1,800 shp (1,300 kW) T53-L-703 turboshaft engine. The AH-1S is also referred to as the "Improved AH-1S", "AH-1S Modified", or "AH-1S(MOD)" prior to 1988. (Prior to 1988, all upgraded aircraft were referred to as variants of the AH-1S.)
QAH-1S
A target drone conversion of the AH-1S by Bell-Bristol Aerospace under a joint Canadian-U.S. development program started in 1994. Honeywell further modified the QAH-1S into the Hokum-X by installing systems and hardware to allow it to simulate the Russian Kamov Ka-50 attack helicopter. Three Hokum-Xs were completed from 1998 to 2001.
AH-1P
100 production aircraft with composite rotors, flat plate glass cockpit, and improved cockpit layout for nap-of-earth (NOE) flight. The AH-1P is also referred to as the "Production AH-1S", or "AH-1S(PROD)" prior to 1988. These improvements are considered Step 1 of the AH-1S upgrade program.
AH-1E
98 production aircraft with the Enhanced Cobra Armament System (ECAS) featuring the M97A1 armament subsystem with a three-barreled M197 20 mm cannon. The AH-1E is also referred to as the "Upgunned AH-1S", or "AH-1S(ECAS)" prior to 1988. These improvements are considered Step 2 of the AH-1S upgrade program. AH-1E aircraft included the M147 Rocket Management Subsystem (RMS) to fire 2.75-inch (70 mm) rockets.
AH-1F
143 production aircraft and 387 converted AH-1G Cobras. The AH-1F incorporates all Step 1 and 2 upgrades to the AH-1S. It also featured Step 3 upgrades: a head-up display, a laser rangefinder, an infrared jammer mounted above the engine exhaust, and an infrared suppressing engine exhaust system, and the M143 Air Data Subsystem (ADS). The AH-1F is also referred to as the "Modernized AH-1S", "AH-1S Modernized Cobra", or "AH-1S(MC)" prior to 1988.
Model 249
Experimental demonstrator version fitted with the four-blade rotor system from Bell 412, an uprated engine, and experimental equipment, including Hellfire missiles.
Bell 309 KingCobra
Experimental all-weather version based on the AH-1G single-engine and AH-1J twin-engine designs. Two Bell 309s were produced; the first was powered by a PWC T400-CP-400 Twin-Pac engine set and the second was powered by a Lycoming T55-L-7C engine.
AH-1FB
AH-1F modernized by Turkish Aerospace Industries for the Royal Bahraini Air Force.

== Operators ==
A small number of former military helicopters are operated by civil organizations for display and demonstration, for example by Red Bull.

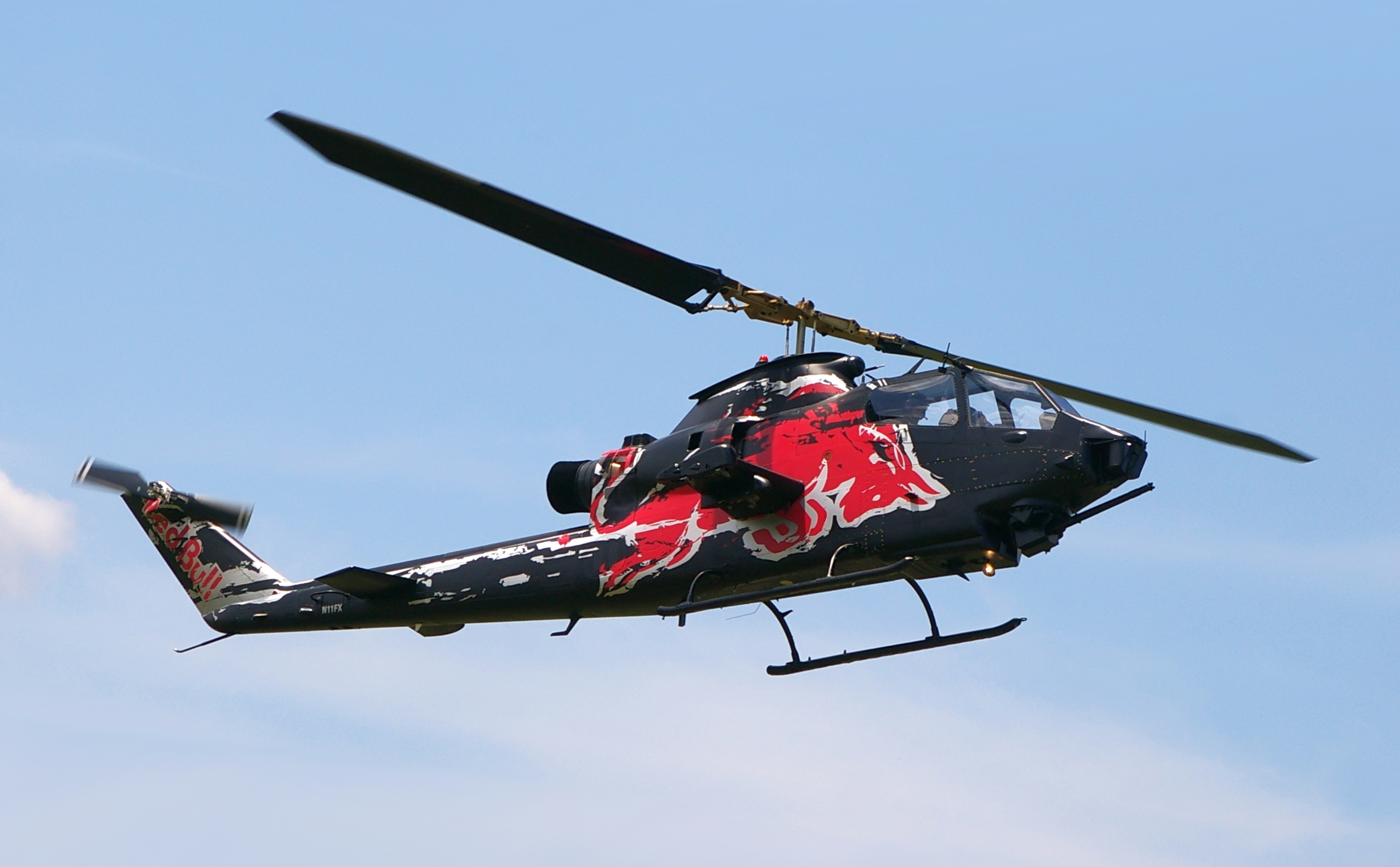
Red Bull (Flying Bulls) TAH-1F at Berlin Tempelhof Airport

Bahrain

- Royal Bahraini Air Force

Japan

- Japan Ground Self-Defense Force

Jordan

- Royal Jordanian Air Force

Kenya

- Kenya Air Force

Pakistan

- Pakistan Army

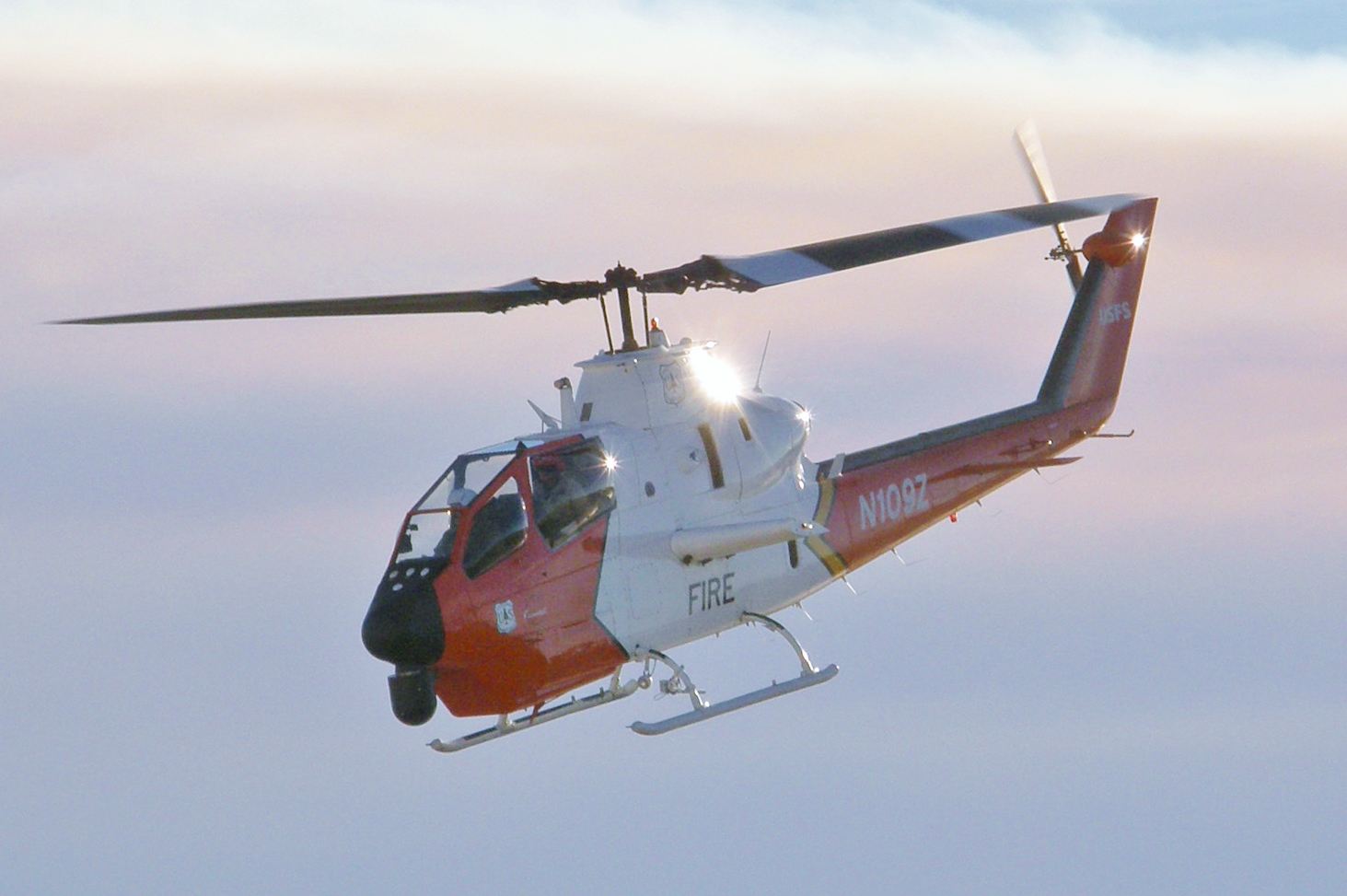
USFS Bell 209 during the California wildfires of October 2007

South Korea

- Republic of Korea Army

=== Former operators ===
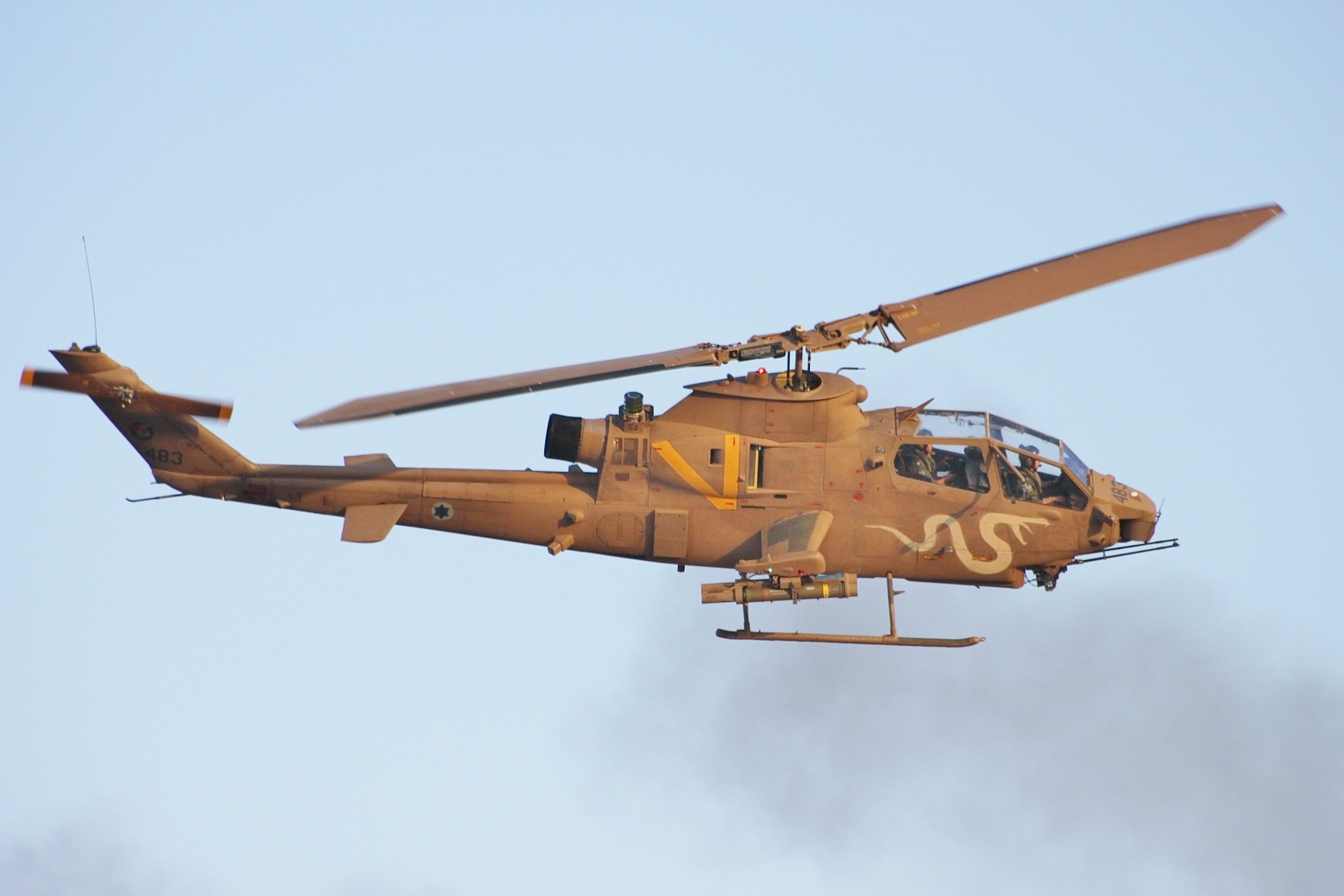
An Israeli AH-1F Cobra

Israel

- Israeli Air Force

Philippines

- Philippine Air Force

Spain

- Spanish Navy

Thailand

- Royal Thai Army

Turkey

- Turkish Army

United States

- United States Army
- Washington Department of Natural Resources
- U.S. Forest Service
- Florida Department of Forestry

== Specifications (AH-1G HueyCobra) ==

Data from The Illustrated Encyclopedia of the World's Modern Military Aircraft, Bell AH-1 Cobra, Modern Fighting Aircraft: AH-1 Cobra

General characteristics

- Crew: 2; one pilot, one co-pilot/gunner (CPG)
- Length: 53 ft (16 m) including rotors
- Fuselage length: 44 ft 5 in (13.5 m)
- Width: 10 ft 4 in (3.15 m) stub wings
- Height: 13 ft 6 in (4.11 m)
- Empty weight: 5,810 lb (2,635 kg)
- Max takeoff weight: 9,500 lb (4,309 kg)
- Powerplant: 1 × Lycoming T53-L-13 turboshaft, 1,100 hp (820 kW)
- Main rotor diameter: 44 ft 0 in (13.4 m)
- Main rotor area: 1,520 sq ft (141 m^{2})
- Blade section: NACA 0009.3 mod

Performance

- Maximum speed: 149 kn (171 mph, 276 km/h)
- Never exceed speed: 190 kn (220 mph, 350 km/h)
- Range: 310 nmi (360 mi, 570 km)
- Service ceiling: 11,400 ft (3,500 m)
- Rate of climb: 1,230 ft/min (6.2 m/s)

Armament

- 2 × 7.62 mm (0.308 in) multi-barrel Miniguns, or 2 × M129 40 mm grenade launchers, or one of each, in the M28 turret. (When one of each was mounted, the minigun was mounted on the right side of the turret, due to feed requirements.)
- 2.75 in (70 mm) rockets – 7 rockets mounted in the M158 launcher or 19 rockets in the M200 launcher
- M18 7.62 mm Minigun pod or XM35 armament subsystem with XM195 20 mm cannon

== See also ==
- U.S. Helicopter Armament Subsystems, AH-1 Cobra

Related development

- Bell 207 Sioux Scout
- Bell 309 KingCobra
- Bell AH-1 SuperCobra
- Bell AH-1Z Viper
- Bell UH-1 Iroquois
- Bell YAH-63

Aircraft of comparable role, configuration, and era

- Agusta A129 Mangusta

Related lists

- List of active United States military aircraft
- List of attack aircraft
- List of rotorcraft
- List of military electronics of the United States
