= Kawasaki OH-1 =

Japanese scout/observation helicopter

OH-1
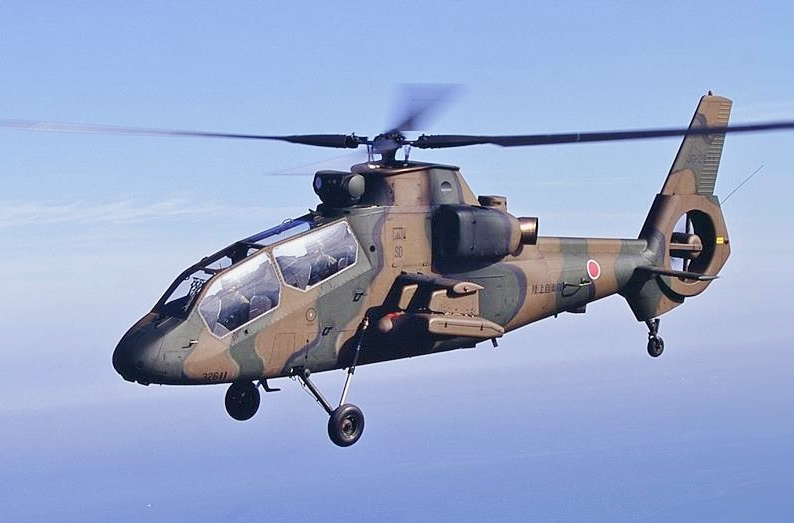
- A Kawasaki OH-1 in flight

General information
- Type: Scout/observation helicopter
- National origin: Japan
- Manufacturer: Kawasaki Aerospace Company
- Status: In service
- Primary user: Japan Ground Self-Defense Force
- Number built: 38 as of 2013

History
- Manufactured: 1996–2013
- Introduction date: 2000
- First flight: 6 August 1996

The Kawasaki OH-1 (nickname: "Ninja") is a military scout/observation helicopter developed and manufactured by the Kawasaki Aerospace Company. The primary operator is the Japan Ground Self-Defense Force (JGSDF), who originally procured the OH-1 as a domestically produced successor to their existing OH-6D Loach fleet. The OH-1 has the distinction of being the first helicopter to be entirely produced in Japan.

In addition to its use as an observation helicopter, it can also be armed to directly participate in combat; such weapons include a limited quantity of air-to-air missiles for self-defense purposes. Several variants of the OH-1 have been proposed, these have included derivatives of the type to serve as an attack helicopter as well as an aborted project to develop a utility helicopter. As of March 2014, a total of 38 OH-1s have entered service with the JGSDF; so far these complement the existing OH-6Ds rather than replace them.

In December 2022, the Japanese government decided to replace 33 OH -1, 12 AH-64D, 47 AH-1S, and 26 U-125A with unmanned aerial vehicles. Japan plans to increase its defense budget from 1.24% of GDP in fiscal 2021 to around 2.0% within 10 years, and has decided to retire these helicopters and aircraft as part of an effort to spend its defense budget efficiently.

== Development ==
=== Origins ===
During the late 1980s, the JGSDF developed a requirement for a new scout/observation helicopter to replace its Kawasaki license-built OH-6Ds, which became the OH-X programme. In June 1989, the JGSDF announced their intention to pursue the development of the OH-X. Several proposals to meet the OH-X requirement were submitted by Kawasaki, Fuji and Mitsubishi. In 1991, Kawasaki's proposal was selected by the JGSDF's Technical Research and Development Institute as the prime contractor for the OH-X programme. On 18 September 1992, the Kawasaki design formally appointed by the Ministry of Defense as the winner. Kawasaki was made responsible for producing 50 percent of the airframe, as well as coordinating development of the rotor system; the remaining airframe elements were manufactured by Mitsubishi and Fuji. Development was formally launched in October 1992.

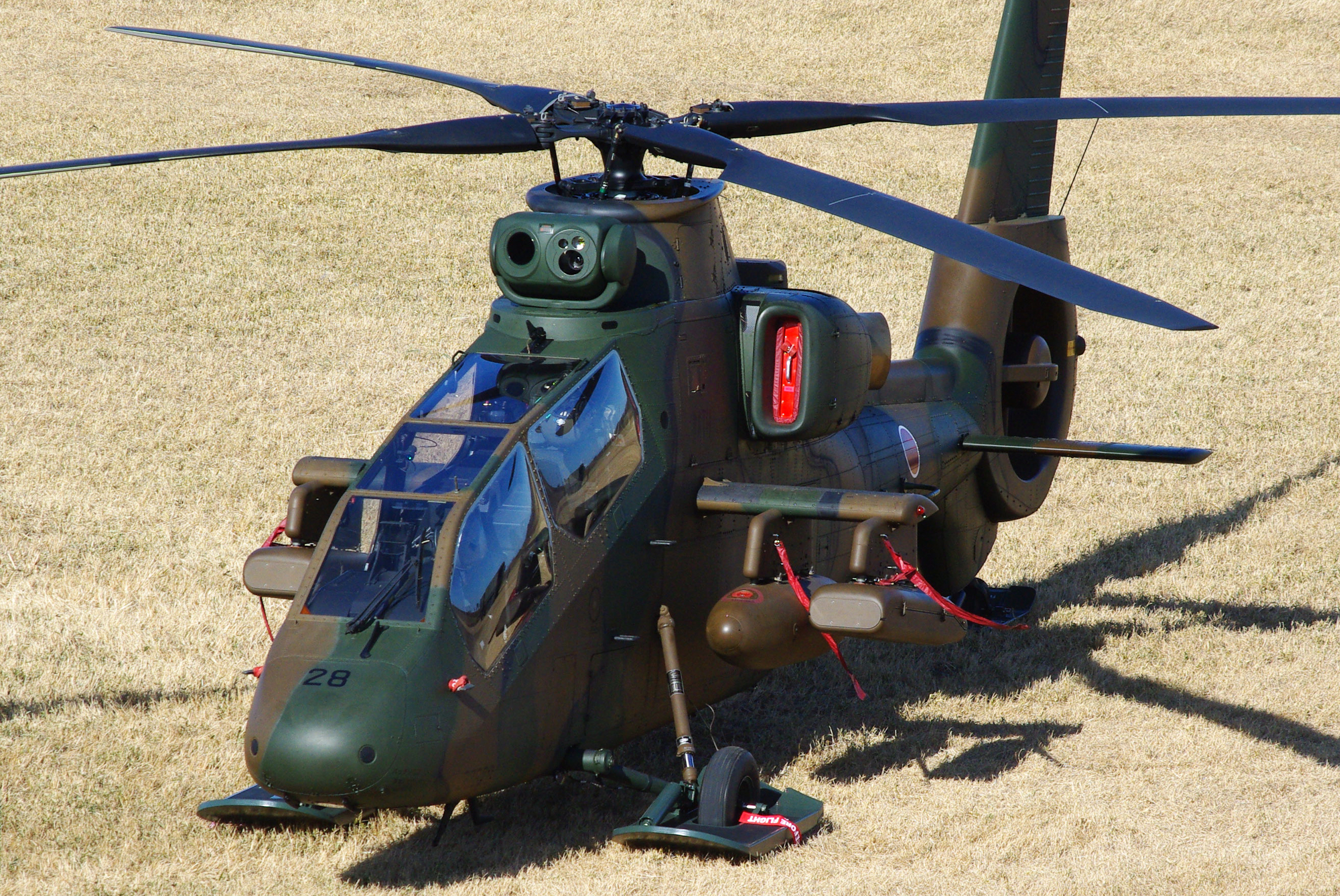
A JGSDF OH-1, 2012

In early 1996, the first OH-1 prototype was rolled out. On 6 August 1996, the first of four OH-1 prototypes (designated XOH-1) performed the type's maiden flight. All four prototypes were flying by March 1997. The four prototypes were delivered to the Japanese Defence Agency for service testing from June to August 1997. By April 1998, flight testing of the prototypes was reportedly around half way complete, having accumulated a combined 400 flight hours during testing, further tests focused on flight validation, operational evaluation, and mission equipment functionality. These four prototype aircraft were all later remanufactured to conform to production standards and redelivered under new serial numbers to the JGSDF.

In June 1998, in response to the finalising of a production contract and an initial order for two OH-1s having been placed earlier that year, the manufacture of production OH-1s formally commenced; By the late 1990s, the JGSDF had announced that it had planned to procure between 150 and 250 OH-Xs to meet its requirements. This figure was significantly fewer than the 297 OH-6Ds that were in active service by March 1995, and there were repeated concerns that numbers could be further curtailed as a result of the impact of defense budget cuts. Procurement, and thus production, of the OH-1 was of a slow pace; each year, only a handful of rotorcraft would normally be purchased, such as a pair of OH-1s being the only units procured in 2004. By 2013, production of the OH-1 was reportedly as presumed to have been terminated.

=== Further development ===
During the 1990s, the JGSDF was interested in procuring a new attack helicopter during the following decade, seeking to replace the Fuji-built Bell AH-1 Cobra fleet. Amongst the proposals produced by Japanese industries was a derivative of the OH-1, tentatively designated as the AH-2. In 1999, it was revealed that the JGSDF was actively studying the modification of the OH-1 into an attack helicopter suitable to their requirements. The OH-1 had been intentionally designed with additional margin to accommodate such growth of scope, the main limiting factors being its transmission and engines. The AH-2 proposal would have involved installing uprated engines and the addition of new unspecified armaments for anti-tank combat missions; Boeing in particular was dismissive of the value of the proposed rotorcraft, claiming that it "cannot fulfill the attack requirement". Kawasaki's proposal was ultimately rejected in favour of a locally-built variant of the Boeing AH-64 Apache.

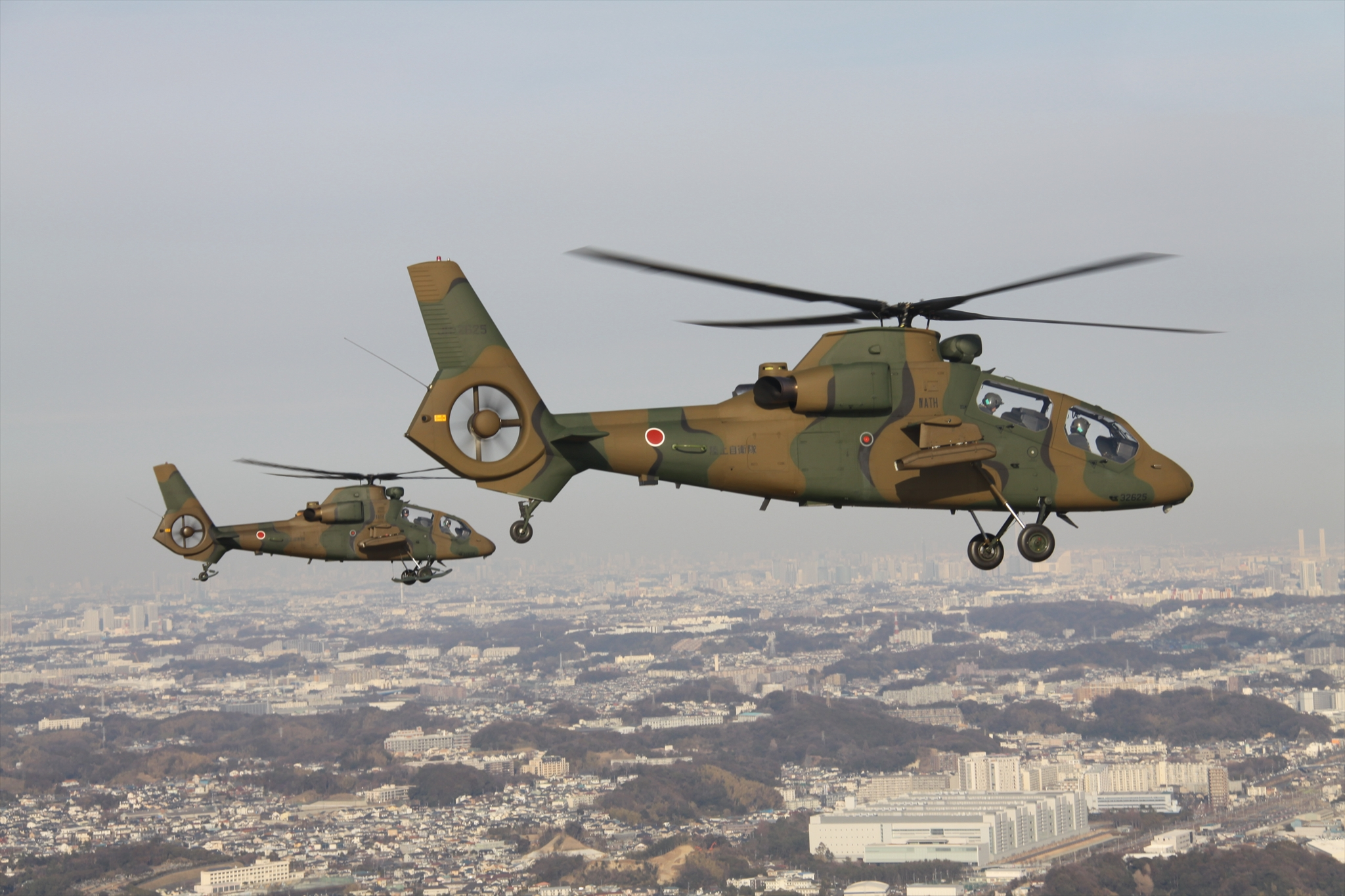
A pair of OH-1s in formation flight

In 2005, Kawasaki proposed the development of a utility-orientated derivative of the OH-1 in response to the fledgling UH-X programme, which intended to replace the JGSDF's outdated fleet of Fuji-built Bell UH-1J Iroquois helicopters. This variant, which would have used the OH-1 as a base, would have featured a new cabin, avionics, transmission and engines, but would have also retained a high level of commonality between the observation and utility models. In 2006, the Japanese government approved a request to fund development of a more powerful variant of the OH-1's Mitsubishi TS1-10 engine. In March 2007, Kawasaki was reportedly close to finalizing its plans for the utility-orientated OH-1 derivative of the OH-1. In 2012, a refreshed proposal for the UH-X requirement was made by Kawasaki, emphasizing its use of OH-1 technology. In July 2015, the Japanese Ministry of Defense (MoD) announced its decision to accept a rival bid made by Fuji/Bell to domestically produce a modified version of the Bell 412 to meet the UH-X requirement instead.

In early 2007, Kawasaki confirmed that it was studying several capability improvements for the OH-1 in terms of adaptability, maneuverability and stability; industry sources also claimed that improvements to the range of the OH-1 along with significant power output increases from the type's TS-1-10 engines. Alternative powerplants for the OH-1 have also been suggested, such as the LHTEC T800 and the MTR MTR390. In late 2008, Kawasaki was considered implementing a series of improvements aimed at increasing the payload of OH-1; this proposed modification was dependent upon demand from the Japanese defense ministry.

== Design ==
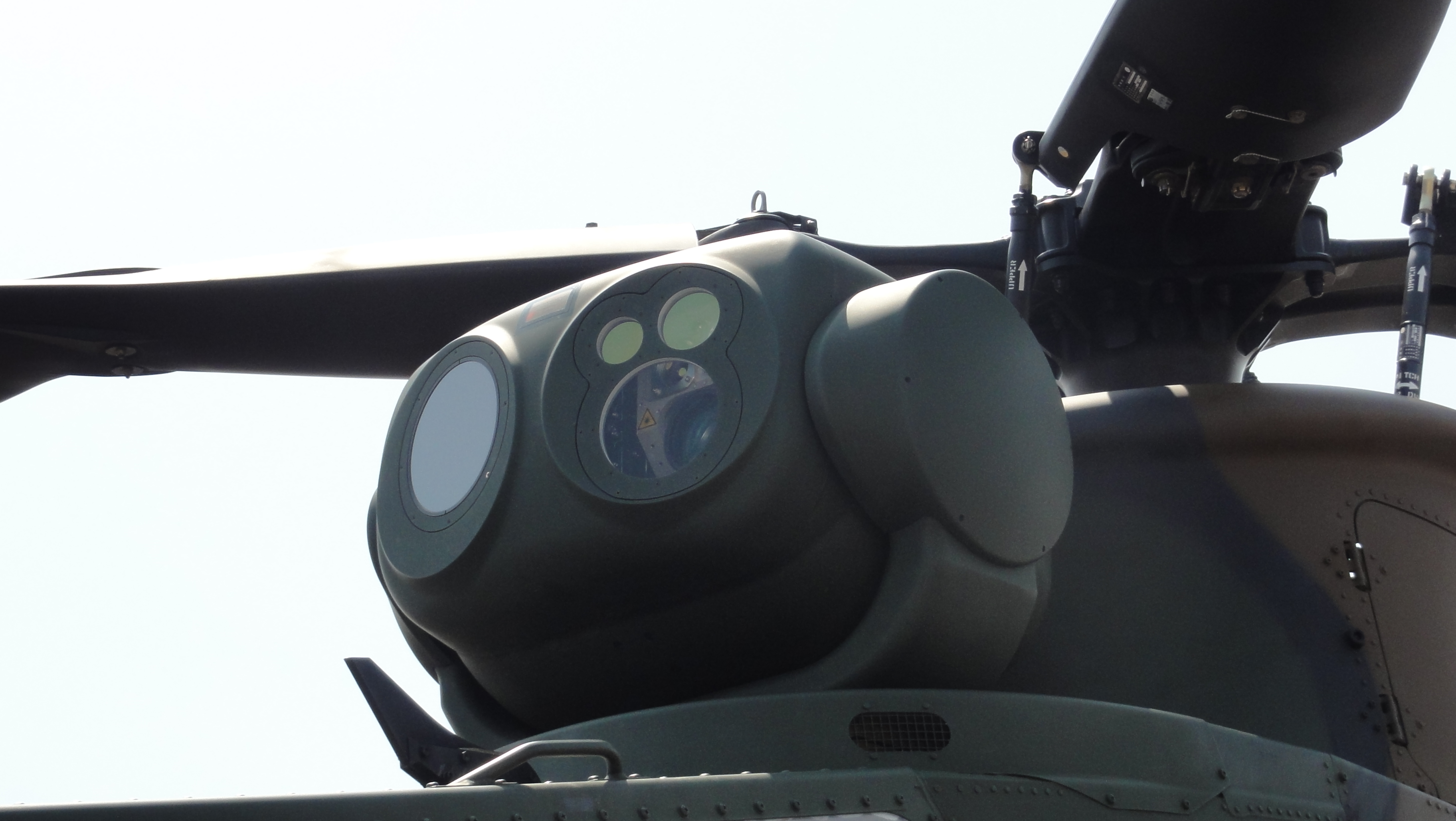
The electro-optical sensor on upper fuselage of an OH-1

The OH-1 Light Observation Helicopter is a tandem-seat, twin-engine scout helicopter. It has a narrow fuselage fitted with small stub wings and a non-retractable tail wheel undercarriage. The OH-1 is suited to armed scout, light escort, and observation duties. It is equipped with an automatic pilot system with flight holding functionality, while the cockpit features a multi-display system to lower workloads on its two-man crew.

The OH-1 is powered by a pair of Mitsubishi TS1 turboshaft engines, equipped with Full Authority Digital Engine Controls (FADEC), which drives a four-blade composite main rotor with a bearingless rotor hub along with a Fenestron-type anti-torque tail rotor (an enclosed tail-fan unit). The Fenestron uses eight asymmetrically spaced blades to reduce both noise and vibration.

A roof-mounted electro-optical sensor turret is located forward of the rotor head, containing a forward looking infrared sensor, a laser rangefinder and a colour TV camera. A total of four hardpoints are fitted under the rotorcraft's stub wings to allow the carriage of external stores, these have a total capacity of 132 kg (291 lb). The outer pylons can carry four Type 91 guided surface-to-air missiles, while the inner pylons are capable of carrying external fuel tanks for additional range or endurance. No additional armament is typically fitted.

== Operational history ==
In January 2000, the first production standard OH-1 was delivered to the JGSDF. The OH-1 is slated to replace the Hughes OH-6D, which remains in service as the primary aircraft in this role.

== Variants ==
- XOH-1: Prototype version
- OH-1: Production model, used as an observation helicopter
- AH-2: Proposed attack helicopter derivative that would have featured uprated engines and additional anti-tank armaments; rejected in favour of Boeing AH-64 Apache.

== Operators ==
Japan

- Japan Ground Self-Defense Force

== Specifications (OH-1) ==
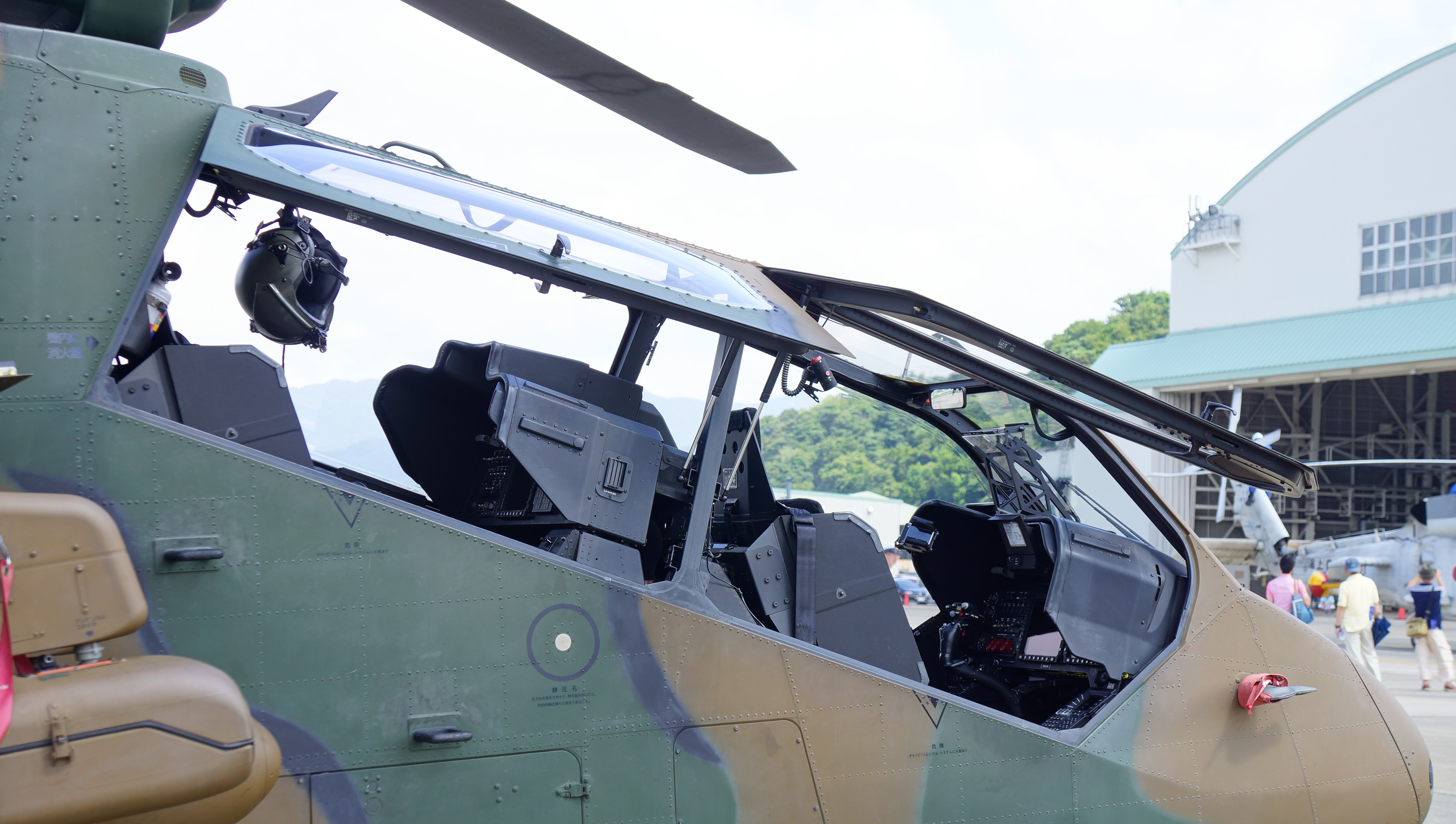
Cockpit of an OH-1

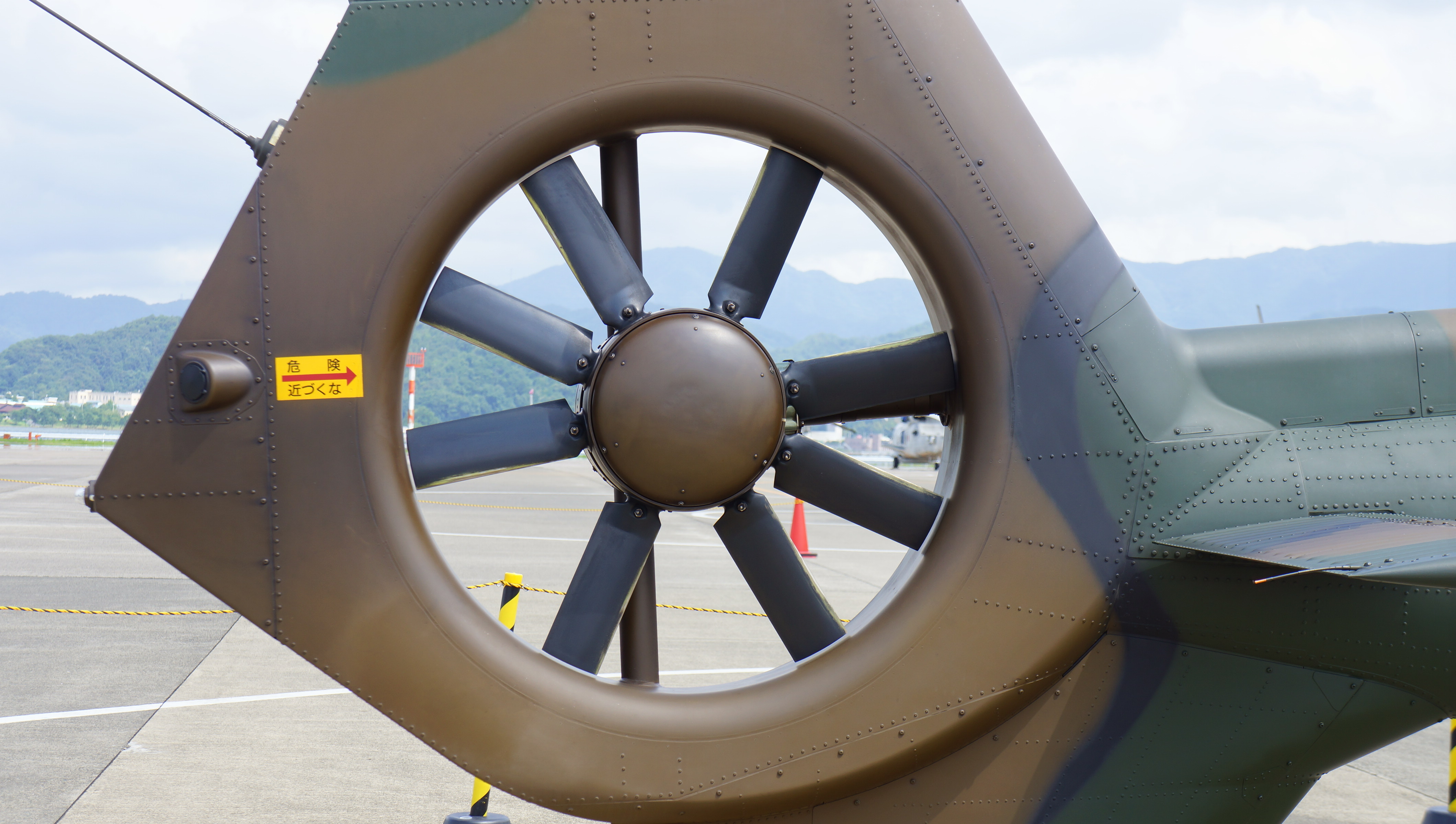
Fenestron tail rotor, note the asymmetrical blades

Data from Kawasaki Aerospace

General characteristics

- Crew: 2 (pilot and observer)
- Length: 12 m (39 ft 4 in)
- Height: 3.8 m (12 ft 6 in)
- Empty weight: 2,450 kg (5,401 lb)
- Max takeoff weight: 4,000 kg (8,818 lb)
- Powerplant: 2 × Mitsubishi TS1-M-10 turboshaft engines, 660 kW (890 hp) each
- Main rotor diameter: 11.6 m (38 ft 1 in)
- Main rotor area: 105.7 m^{2} (1,138 sq ft)

Performance

- Maximum speed: 278 km/h (173 mph, 150 kn)
- Cruise speed: 220 km/h (140 mph, 120 kn)
- Range: 550 km (340 mi, 300 nmi)
- Ferry range: 720 km (450 mi, 390 nmi)
- Service ceiling: 4,880 m (16,010 ft)

Armament

- Hardpoints: 4 × hardpoints under stub wings for auxiliary fuel tanks (inner hardpoints) and Type 91 air-to-air missiles (outer hardpoints)

== See also ==
External videos
- Kawasaki OH-1 Public Flight Demonstration
- OH-1 Performing Maneuvers and Landing

Aircraft of comparable role, configuration, and era

- Bell ARH-70 Arapaho
- Bell 360 Invictus
- Boeing–Sikorsky RAH-66 Comanche
- Eurocopter Tiger ARH
- Leonardo Helicopters AW249
- HAL Prachand
- Harbin Z-19
- TAI/AgustaWestland T129 ATAK

Related lists

- List of military aircraft of Japan
- List of rotorcraft
