= Type 91 surface-to-air missile =

Japanese man-portable surface-to-air missile

Type 91
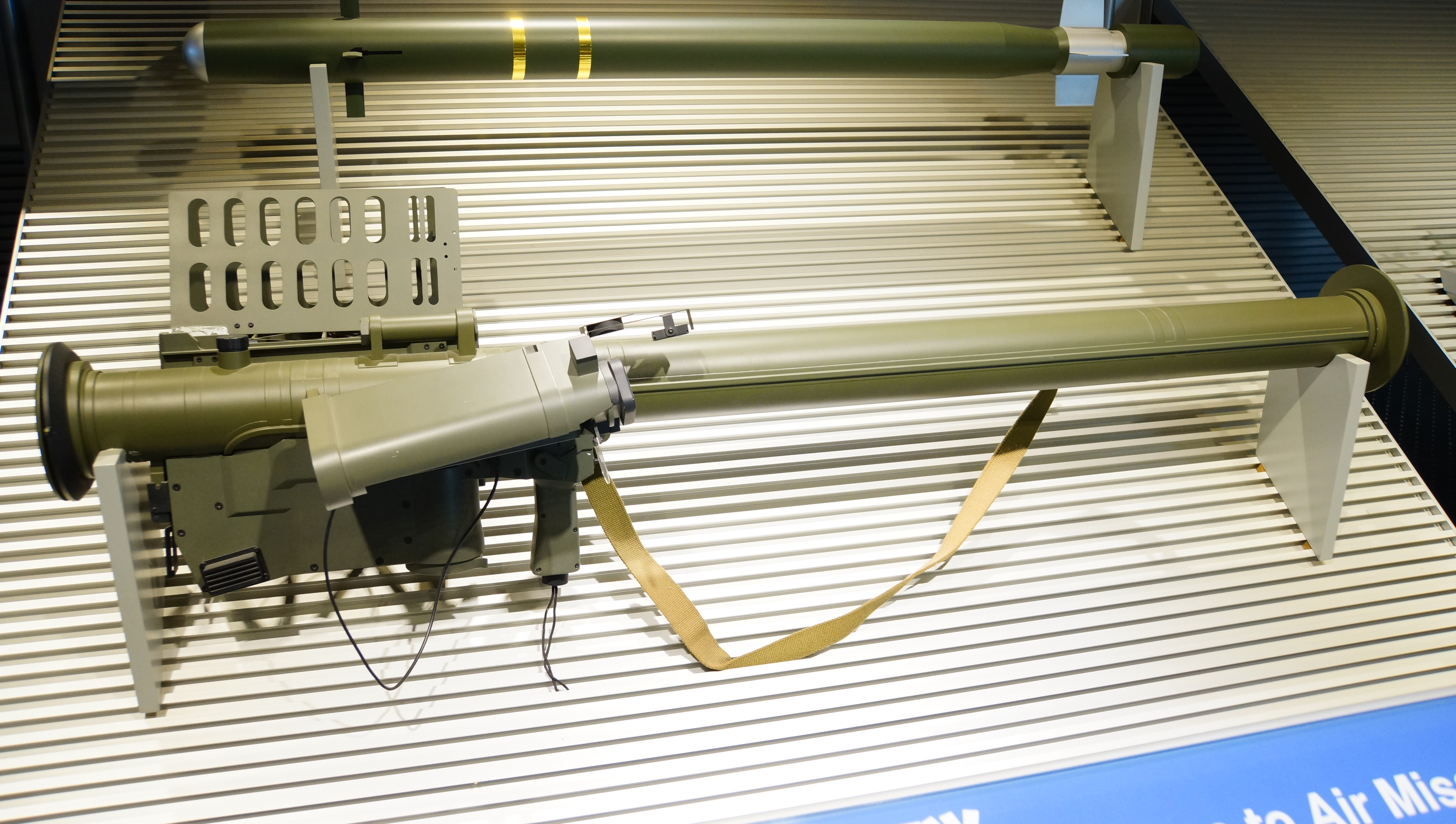
- A mock-up display of the Type 91 with a dummy missile at the JASDF Hamamatsu Air Base Public Relations Center.
- Type: Man-portable surface-to-air missile
- Place of origin: Japan

Service history
- In service: 1994–Present
- Used by: Japan

Production history
- Designer: Toshiba
- Designed: 1979-1990
- Manufacturer: Toshiba
- Unit cost: $ 145,000 (As of 2006)
- Produced: 1991–1993 (Original); 2007–Present (Type 91 Kai)
- Variants: See Variants

Specifications (Type 91 Kin-SAM)
- Mass: 11.5 kg
- Length: 1.43 m
- Diameter: 80 mm
- Crew: 1
- Engine: Solid Rocket Motor; Mach 1.9
- Guidance system: Infrared homing
- Launch platform: Kawasaki OH-1; Toshiba Type 93 Surface-to-air missile

The Type 91 surface-to-air missile (91式携帯地対空誘導弾, 91-shiki Keitai Chitaikū Yūdōdan) is a Japanese man-portable air-defense system (MANPADS). Its appearance is similar to the US-made FIM-92 Stinger anti-aircraft missile. It was created in order to replace its stock of American-made Stinger MANPADS, since the Type 91 has a better guidance system, which consist of both visible light and infrared system options. The Stinger, on the other hand, uses a passive infrared homing guidance system.

In the ranks of the JSDF, the Type 91 is colloquially known as Hand Arrow. The Type 91 is sometimes mistaken as a Japanese-made version of the Stinger. The Type 91 is currently exclusively used by the JSDF and has not been exported overseas to date due to previous interpretations of post-war constitutional restrictions and the laws arising from them.

The Type 91 is officially treated as a 4th-generation MANPAD system.

== History ==
Development work on an advanced infra-red seeker began in 1979 at the Technical Research and Development Institute (TRDI) after Toshiba and Kawasaki Heavy Industries submitted their projects with the former being selected. In 1982, the Japan Self-Defense Forces began looking for a replacement for the FIM-92 Stinger which was then in service via Foreign Military Sales. Development of the missile was then known as Keiko or SAM-X was deferred until 1987. Toshiba took over the project in 1988 and began engineering development. The development was completed in 1990, and low rate production was started in 1991. The missile was initially designated the Type 91 Kin-SAM and as the SAM-2. It was first deployed in 1994.

The adoption of the Type 91 allowed the JSDF to gradually retire the Stingers, with the last stocks officially removed from active JGSDF service in 2009. JGSDF Apaches still retain the Stinger as anti-aircraft missiles.

In 2007, the Type 91 Kai was delivered by Toshiba after being produced to replace the original Type 91 with several improvements including its motor and capability to be fired in the dark.

== Design ==
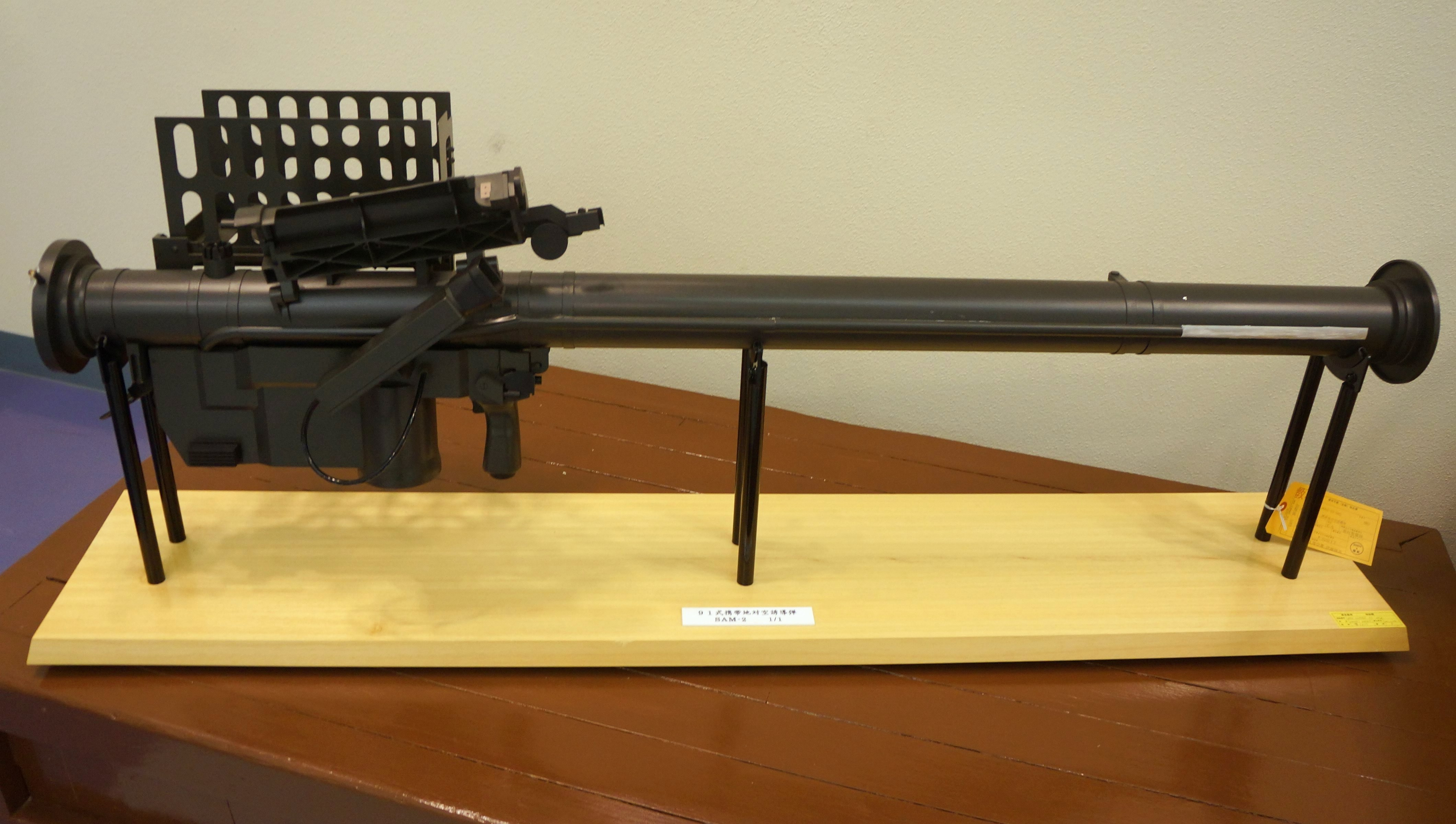
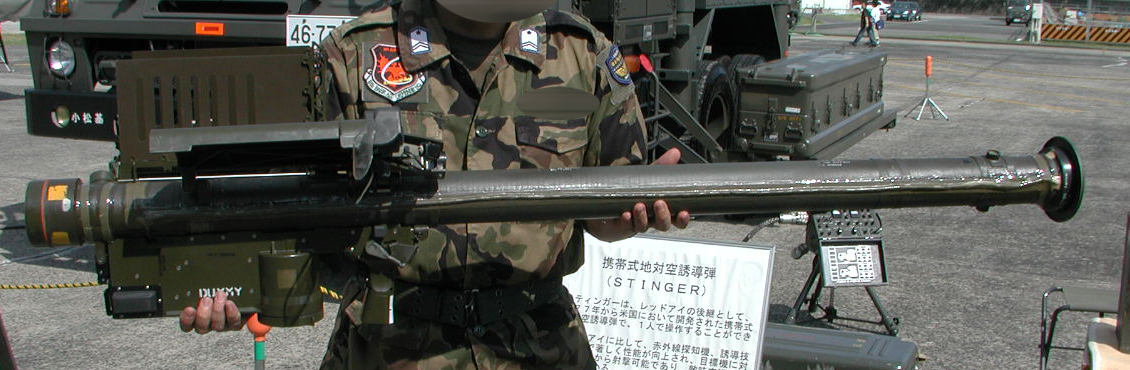
The Type 91 on top and the Stinger below. These two MANPADs look exactly the same at first glance.

The missile is similar to the Stinger missile it replaced with two solid rocket motors, an initial booster motor and a sustainer. The imaging seeker uses 3rd generation-made infrared and ultraviolet guidance systems. On launch, the missile records the target's image profile and is able to ignore defensive countermeasures such as flares. The Type 91's missile travels at a Mach speed of 1.9.

The Type 91 comes with the rocket launcher, an external battery pack, IFF system, missiles and other training equipment. The Type 91 weighs 11.5 kilograms, which is lighter than the Stinger as it has a weight of 15.7 kilograms.

Improvements of the Type 91 Kai included missile with image-infra-red seeker, smokeless motor and the capability to have faster shooting and target acquisition and was also improved for the ability to be used at night.

== Variants ==
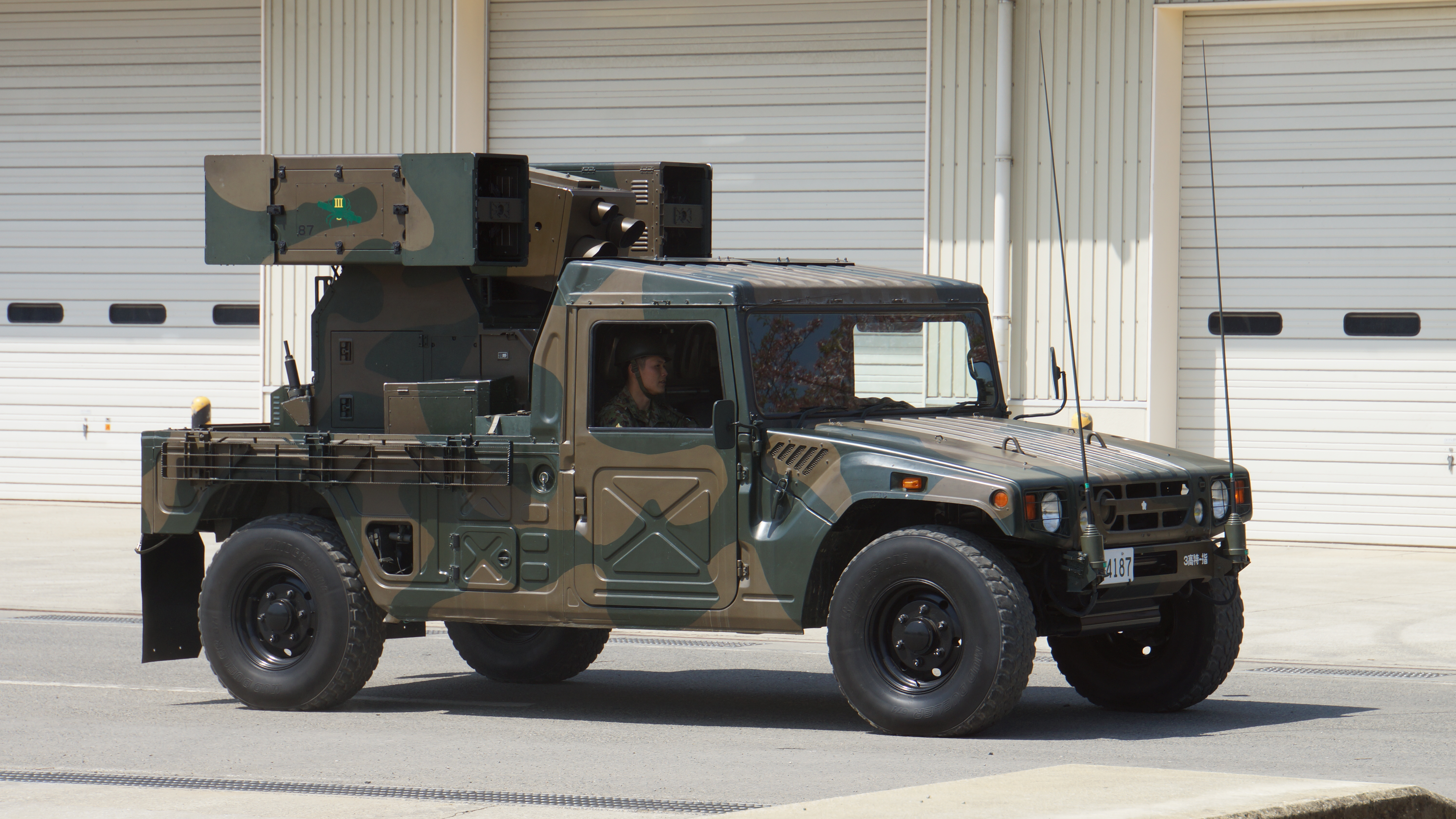
Type 93 missile launchers on a Kōkidōsha

An improved version of the Type 91, called the Type 91 Kai, was delivered to replace the original. A vehicle based variant, the Type 93 Surface-to-air missile launcher, has also been developed. This is also made by Toshiba. The system is mounted on Toyota-made Kōkidōshas.

== Operators ==
Japan

- Japan Ground Self-Defense Force: The Type 91 is used by the Kawasaki OH-1 as its primary anti-aircraft weapon system aside from being used as a MANPAD.
- Japan Air Self-Defense Force: Being used as an anti-aircraft MANPAD by the 101st Base Protection Team.
