= List of tiltrotor aircraft =

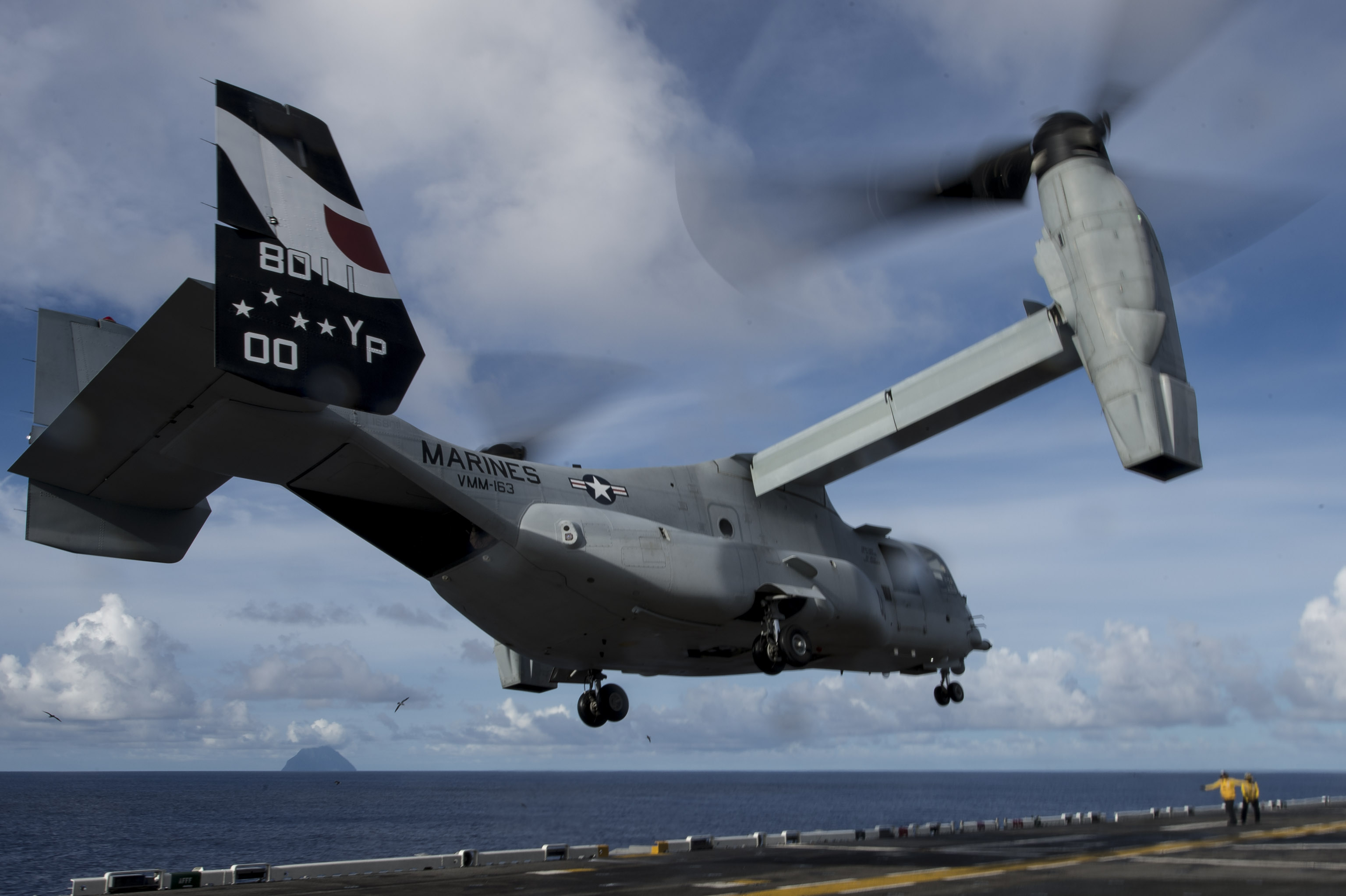
Bell-Boeing V-22 Osprey, the only crewed tiltrotor in production to date.

A tiltrotor is a type of vertical takeoff and landing (VTOL) aircraft that convert from vertical to horizontal flight by rotating propellers or ducted fans from horizontal positions like conventional aircraft propellers to vertical like a helicopter's rotors.

== Tiltrotor aircraft ==
Type	Country	Class	Role	Date	Status	No.	Notes
Aerocopter Sarus	US	Mono rotor	Commuter	2009	Project	0	
American Dynamics AD-150	US	Twin fans	Scout UAV	2011	Project	0	USMC Tier III VUAS submission. Ducted fans.
AgustaWestland AW609	Italy	Twin rotor	Civil transport	March 2003	Prototype		Originally Bell-Augusta BA609.
AgustaWestland Project Zero	Italy	Twin fans	Experimental	June 2011	Prototype	1	Hybrid propulsion. Ducted fans.
Baldwin MTR-SD	US	Mono rotor	Experimental	2010	Prototype	1	Small radio-control mono tiltrotor testbed.
Bell XV-3	US	Twin rotor	Experimental	August 1955	Prototype	2	Originally designated XH-33.
Bell XV-15	US	Twin rotor	Experimental	May 1977	Prototype	2	Developed into V-22 Osprey.
Bell X-22	US	Quad fans	Experimental	May 1977	Prototype	2	4 tilting ducted fans powered by 4 turboshaft engines
Bell Boeing V-22 Osprey	US	Twin rotor	Military transport	March 1989	Production		
Bell V-247 Vigilant	US		Multirole UAV	2016	Project	0	
Bell MV-75 Cheyenne II	US		Heavy transport	2017	Prototype		Intended for both commuter and military roles.
Bell Eagle Eye	US	Twin rotor	Scout UAV	March 1998	Prototype		
Bell Boeing Quad TiltRotor	US	Quad rotor	Heavy transport	2005	Project	0	Several redesigns.
Boeing Advanced Civil Tiltrotor	US	Twin rotor	Civil transport	2002	Project	0	Concept only.
Colugo Systems ARCopter	Israel	Quad frame	Scout UAV	2015	-		Tilting quadcopter frame.
CTA Heliconair HC-I Convertiplano	Brazil		Experimental	1954	Prototype	1	
Curtiss-Wright X-100	US	Twin rotor	Experimental	March 1960	Prototype	1	Testbed for radial force principle. Developed into X-19.
Curtiss-Wright X-19	US	Quad rotor	Transport testbed	November 1963	-	2	
Doak VZ-4	US	Twin rotor	Experimental	February 1958	Prototype	1	U.S. Army VTOL research project. Ducted fans.
Dornier Do 29	Germany	Twin rotor	Experimental	December 1958	Prototype	2	Utility VTOL testbed. Inverted rotors.
Dufaux triplane	Switzerland		Experimental	1909	-		Central rotor and engine. Built but could not fly.
FLUTR model 1	Germany		Flying car	2018	Project	0	
Focke-Achgelis Fa 269	Germany	Twin rotor	Fighter	1943	-		Inverted rotors.
IAI Panther	Israel	Trirotor	Recon UAV	2011	Prototype		Third rotor for lift only.
IAI/Hankuk FE-Panther	Israel, South Korea	Trirotor	Recon UAV	2016	Prototype		Improved Panther with separate engine for horizontal flight.
Mil Mi-30	USSR		Transport	1972	Project	0	"Vintoplan".
Nord Aviation N 500 Cadet	France		Experimental	July 1968	Prototype		Ducted fans.
Russian Helicopters Albatross	Russia		UAV	2015	Project	0	In development; hybrid tiltrotor-tiltwing.
Transcendental Model 1-G	US	Twin rotor	Experimental	July 1954	Prototype		Single engine.
Transcendental Model 2	US		Experimental	1956	-		Improved Model 1.

== See also ==
- List of VTOL aircraft
