= Bell X-22 =

1960s American V/STOL aircraft

X-22
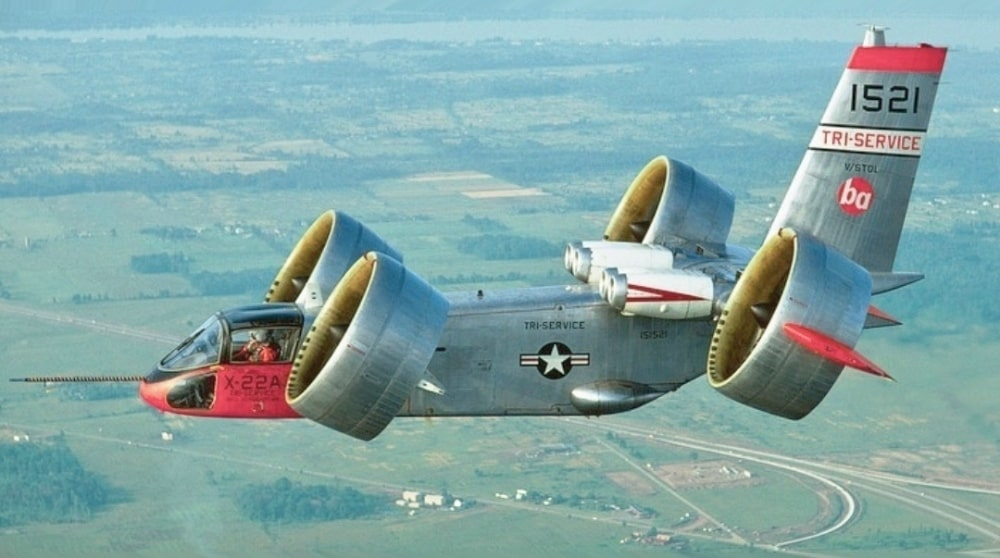
- Bell X-22 in flight

General information
- Type: V/STOL prototype
- Manufacturer: Bell Helicopters
- Status: 1 stored, 1 destroyed
- Primary user: United States
- Number built: 2

History
- First flight: 17 March 1966
- Retired: October 1984

The Bell X-22 is an American V/STOL X-plane with four tilting ducted fans. Takeoff was to selectively occur either with the propellers tilted vertically upwards, or on a short runway with the nacelles tilted forward at approximately 45°. Additionally, the X-22 was to provide more insight into the tactical application of vertical takeoff troop transporters such as the preceding Hiller X-18 and the X-22's successor, the Bell XV-15. Another program requirement was a true airspeed in level flight of at least 525 km/h (326 mph; 283 knots).

The X-22 was not a prototype of the V-22 Osprey, although it was a part of the development of tilt-rotor aircraft and Bell's work in this field of study.

== Design and development ==
In 1962, the United States Navy announced their request for two prototype aircraft with V/STOL capability, powered by four ducted fan nacelles. Bell Helicopters already had extensive experience with VTOL aircraft and was able to utilize an already developed test mockup. In 1964 the prototype, internally referred to by Bell as Model D2127, was ordered by the Navy and received the X-22 designation. It was unveiled at an event in Niagara Falls in May 1965.

Three-bladed propellers were mounted on four wings and synchronized through a wave-interconnection system, were connected to four gas turbines which, in turn, were mounted in pairs on the rear wings. Maneuvering was achieved by tilting the propeller blades in combination with control surfaces (elevators and ailerons), which were located in the thrust stream of the propellers.

== Operational history ==
The maiden flight of the prototype occurred on 17 March 1966. In contrast to other tilt-rotor craft (such as the Bell XV-3), transitions between hovering and horizontal flight succeeded nearly immediately. However, interest increased more towards VTOL and V/STOL properties, not the specific design of the prototype.

Due to failure of a propeller control, described by test pilot Stanley Kakol as the only non-redundant component in the power chain, the prototype crashed on 8 August 1966 and technicians stripped it for components in order to make the second prototype flight capable. The fuselage was still used as a simulator for some time afterwards.

The second X-22 first flew on 26 August 1967. Early that year, it was equipped with a variable flight control and stabilizer system from Cornell Aeronautical Laboratory, which improved flight performance. Although the X-22 was considered to be the best aircraft of its type at the time, the program was canceled. The required maximum speed of 525 km/h was never reached. The second prototype was moved to Cornell Aeronautical Laboratory for further testing; the last flight occurred in 1988.

== Surviving aircraft ==
Although not on display, the remaining craft, 151521, is currently stored by the Niagara Aerospace Museum, New York.

According to the employees at the Museum, the craft was held onto after being debated for scrapping by the Navy.

== Specifications (X-22A) ==
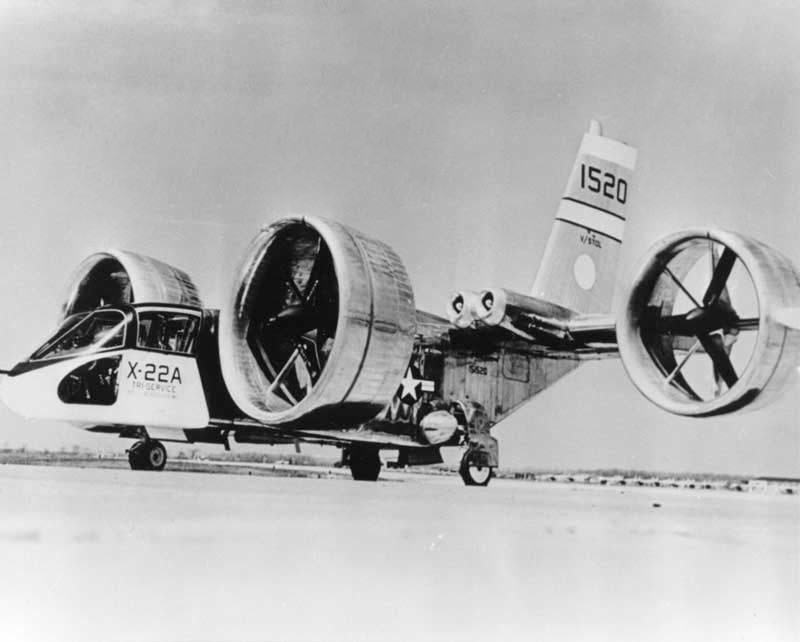
Bell X-22 on the tarmac

General characteristics

- Crew: two + six passengers
- Capacity: 1,200 lb (544 kg) max. payload
- Length: 39.57 ft (12.06 m)
- Wingspan: 39 ft 3 in (11.96 m)
- Wingspan (front wing): 22.916 ft (6.98 m)
- Height: 20.69 ft (6.31 m)
- Empty weight: 10,478 lb (4,753 kg)
- Gross weight: 15,287 lb (6,934 kg)
- Max takeoff weight: 17,644 lb (8,003 kg) Maximum landing weight of 15,287 lbs
- Fuel capacity: 465 US gal (387 imp gal; 1,760 L) in single fuselage tank JP-4 or JP-5
- Powerplant: 4 × General Electric-YT58-GE-8D turboshaft engines, 1,250 shp (930 kW) each
- Propellers: Three-bladed Hamilton Standard propellers mounted in wingtip swiveling ducts

Performance

- Maximum speed: 278 kn (320 mph, 515 km/h) at 10,000 ft (3,048 m)
- Cruise speed: 185 kn (213 mph, 343 km/h)
- Stall speed: 98.2 kn (113.0 mph, 181.9 km/h)
- Range: 386 nmi (444 mi, 715 km)
- Combat range: 186 nmi (214 mi, 344 km)
- Service ceiling: 27,800 ft (8,500 m)
- Hover ceiling in ground effect : 12,000 ft (3,700 m)
- Hover ceiling out of ground effect : 6,000 ft (1,800 m)

== See also ==
Aircraft of comparable role, configuration, and era

- Bell Boeing V-22 Osprey

Related lists

- List of VTOL aircraft
- List of tilt-rotors
