= Pitch drop-back =

Aerodynamic phenomena

Pitch drop-back is the phenomenon by which an aircraft which is perturbed in flight path angle from its trim position by a step input exhibits an output which is indicative of a second order system.

A pilot who actuates an elevator input may find that the aircraft then "droops" or "drops back" to a position further toward the start position. The phenomenon is particularly marked in tilt-rotor aircraft. Pitch drop-back may be controlled using a Stability Augmentation System or Stability Control and Augmentation System.

== See also ==
- List of aviation, avionics, aerospace and aeronautical abbreviations
- Index of aviation articles
