= Tiltrotor =

Aircraft type

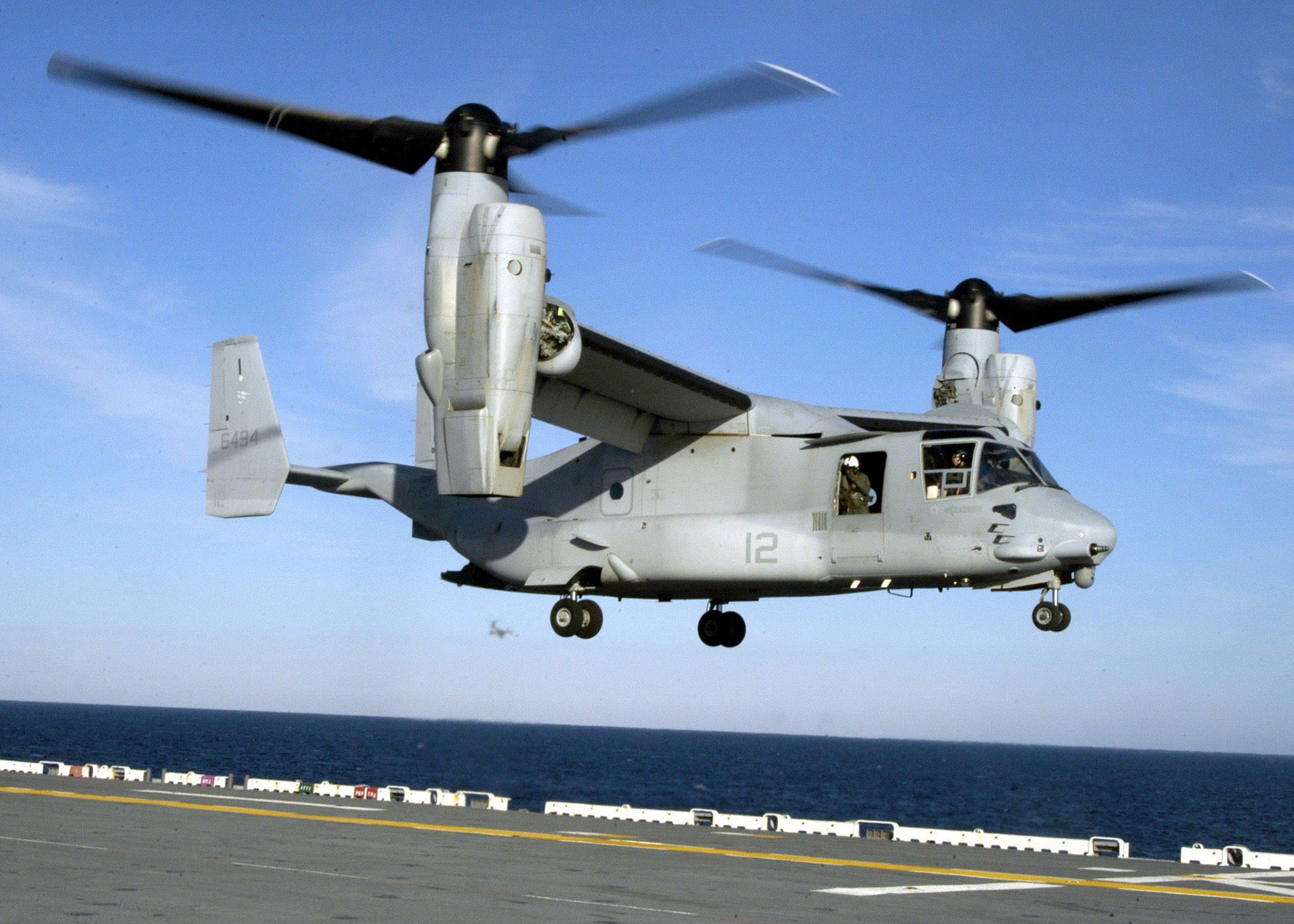
The Bell Boeing V-22 Osprey

A tiltrotor is a rotorcraft that generates lift and propulsion by way of one or more powered rotors (sometimes called proprotors) mounted on rotating shafts or nacelles usually at the ends of a fixed wing. Almost all tiltrotors use a transverse rotor design, with a few exceptions that use other multirotor layouts. Tiltrotor design combines the VTOL capability of a helicopter with the speed and range of a conventional fixed-wing aircraft. For vertical flight, the rotors are angled so the plane of rotation is horizontal, generating lift the way a normal helicopter rotor does. As the aircraft gains speed, the rotors are progressively tilted forward, with the plane of rotation eventually becoming vertical. In this mode the rotors provide thrust as a propeller, and the airfoil of the fixed wings takes over providing the lift via the forward motion of the entire aircraft. Since the rotors can be configured to be more efficient for propulsion (e.g. with high root-tip twist) and it avoids a helicopter's issues of retreating blade stall, tiltrotors can achieve higher cruise speeds and takeoff weights than helicopters. A tiltrotor aircraft differs from a tiltwing in that only the rotors pivot rather than the entire wing. This method trades off efficiency in vertical flight for efficiency in STOL/STOVL operations.

== History ==
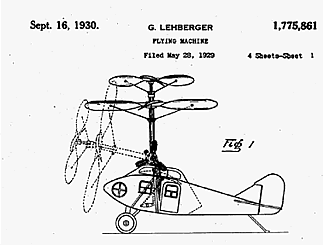
Original Patent filed May 28, 1929

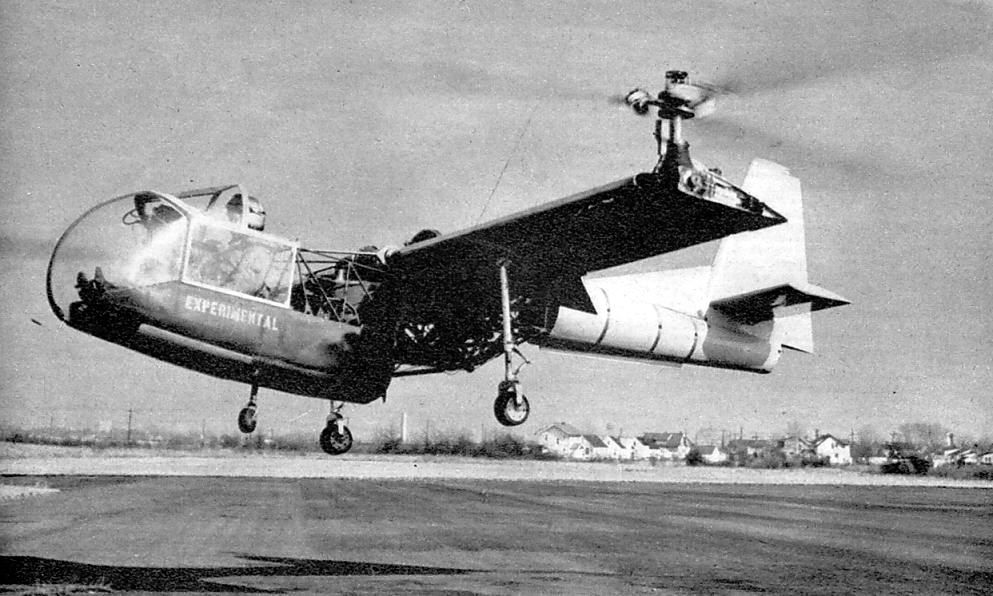
Transcendental Model 1-G hovering

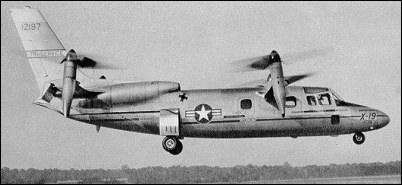
Curtiss-Wright X-19 experimental VTOL plane in flight

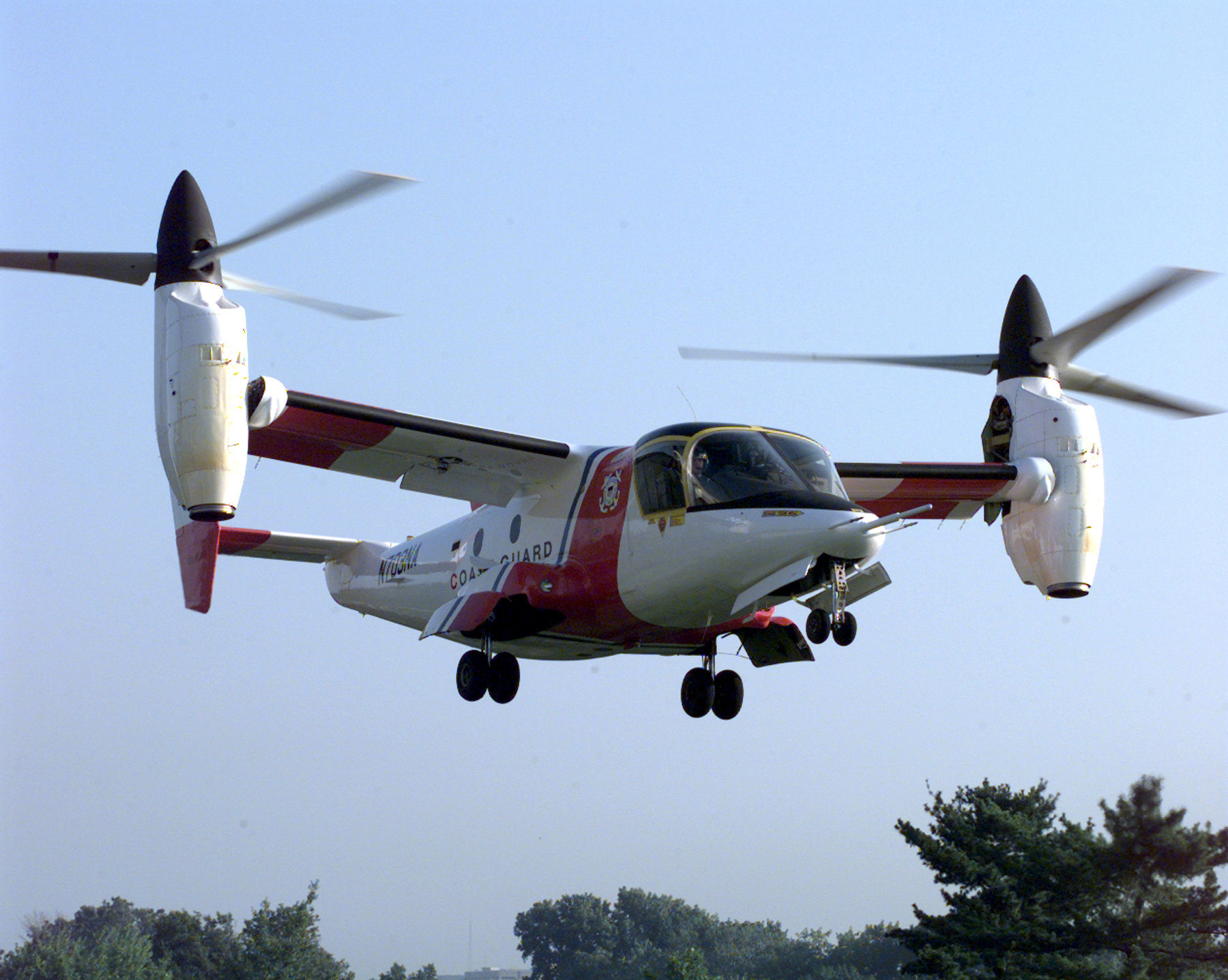
A Bell XV-15 prepares to land

The first work in the direction of a tilt-rotor (French "Convertible") seems to have originated ca. 1902 by the French-Swiss brothers Henri and Armand Dufaux, for which they got a patent in February 1904, and made their work public in April 1905. Concrete ideas of constructing vertical take-off and landing (VTOL) aircraft using helicopter-like rotors were pushed further in the 1930s. The first design resembling modern tiltrotors was patented by George Lehberger in May 1930, but he did not further develop the concept. In World War II, Weserflug in Germany came up with the concept of their P.1003/1 around 1938, which was tilting to the top with part of the wings but not the full wings, so it may be in between tilt-rotor and tilt-planes. Shortly after a German prototype, the Focke-Achgelis Fa 269, was developed starting in 1942, which was tilting to the ground, but never flew. Platt and LePage patented the PL-16, the first American tiltrotor aircraft. However, the company shut down in August 1946 due to lack of capital.

Two prototypes which made it to flight were the one-seat Transcendental Model 1-G and two seat Transcendental Model 2, each powered by a single reciprocating engine. Development started on the Model 1-G in 1947, though it did not fly until 1954. The Model 1-G flew for about a year until a crash in Chesapeake Bay on July 20, 1955, destroying the prototype aircraft but not seriously injuring the pilot. The Model 2 was developed and flew shortly afterwards, but the US Air Force withdrew funding in favor of the Bell XV-3 and it did not fly much beyond hover tests. The Transcendental 1-G is the first tiltrotor aircraft to have flown and accomplished most of a helicopter to aircraft transition in flight (to within 10 degrees of true horizontal aircraft flight).

Built in 1953, the experimental Bell XV-3 flew until 1966, proving the fundamental soundness of the tiltrotor concept and gathering data about technical improvements needed for future designs.

A related technology development is the tiltwing. Although two designs, the Canadair CL-84 Dynavert and the LTV XC-142, were technical successes, neither entered production due to other issues. Tiltrotors generally have better hover efficiency than tiltwings, but less than helicopters.

In 1968, Westland Aircraft displayed their own designs—a small experimental craft (We 01C) and a 68-seater transport We 028—at the SBAC Farnborough Airshow. In 1972, with funding from NASA and the U.S. Army, Bell Helicopter Textron started development of the XV-15, a twin-engine tiltrotor research aircraft. Two aircraft were built to prove the tiltrotor design and explore the operational flight envelope for military and civil applications.

In 1981, using experience gained from the XV-3 and XV-15, Bell and Boeing Helicopters began developing the V-22 Osprey, a twin-turboshaft military tiltrotor aircraft for the U.S. Air Force and the U.S. Marine Corps. Bell teamed with Boeing in developing a commercial tiltrotor, but Boeing went out in 1998 and Agusta came in for the Bell/Agusta BA609. This aircraft was redesignated as the AW609 following the transfer of full ownership to AgustaWestland in 2011. Bell has also developed a tiltrotor unmanned aerial vehicle (UAV), the TR918 Eagle Eye.

Russia has had a few tiltrotor projects, mostly unmanned such as the Mil Mi-30, and has started another in 2015.

Around 2005–2010, Bell and Boeing teamed up again to perform a conceptual study of a larger Quad TiltRotor (QTR) for the US Army's Joint Heavy Lift (JHL) program. The QTR is a larger, four rotor version of the V-22 with two tandem wings sets of fixed wings and four tilting rotors.

In January 2013, the FAA defined US tiltrotor noise rules to comply with ICAO rules. A noise certification will cost $588,000, same as for a large helicopter.

AgustaWestland stated they have free-flown a manned electric tiltrotor in 2013 called Project Zero, with its rotors inside the wingspan.

In 2013, Bell Helicopter CEO John Garrison responded to Boeing's taking a different airframe partner for the US Army's future lift requirements by indicating that Bell would take the lead itself in developing the Bell V-280 Valor, with Lockheed Martin.

In 2014, the Clean Sky 2 program (by the European Union and industry) awarded AgustaWestland and its partners $328 million to develop a "next-generation civil tiltrotor" design for the offshore market, with Critical Design Review near the end of 2016. The goals are tilting wing sections, 11 metric tons Maximum takeoff weight, seating for 19 to 22 passengers, first flight in 2021, a cruise speed of 300 knots, a top speed of 330 knots, a ceiling of 25,000 feet, and a range of 500 nautical miles.

== Technical considerations ==
=== Controls ===
In vertical flight, the tiltrotor uses controls very similar to a transverse or tandem-rotor helicopter. Yaw is controlled by tilting its rotors in opposite directions. Roll is provided through differential power or thrust. Pitch is provided through rotor blades cyclic-, or nacelle, tilt. Vertical motion is controlled with conventional rotor blade pitch and either a conventional helicopter collective control lever (as in the Bell/Agusta BA609) or a unique control similar to a fixed-wing engine control called a thrust control lever (TCL) (as in the Bell-Boeing V-22 Osprey).

=== Speed and payload issues ===
VTOL disc loading lift efficiency

The tiltrotor's advantage is significantly greater speed than a helicopter. In a helicopter the maximum forward speed is defined by the turn speed of the rotor; at some point the helicopter will be moving forward at the same speed as the spinning of the backwards-moving side of the rotor, so that side of the rotor sees zero or negative airspeed, and begins to stall. This limits modern helicopters to cruise speeds of about 150 knots / 277 km/h. However, with the tiltrotor this problem is avoided, because the rotors are perpendicular to the motion in the high-speed portions of the flight regime (and thus not subject to this reverse flow condition), so the tiltrotor has relatively high maximum speed—over 300 knots (560 km/h) has been demonstrated in the two types of tiltrotors flown so far, and cruise speeds of 250 knots (460 km/h) are achieved.

This speed is achieved somewhat at the expense of payload. As a result of this reduced payload, some estimate that a tiltrotor does not exceed the transport efficiency (speed times payload) of a helicopter, while others conclude the opposite. Additionally, the tiltrotor propulsion system is more complex than a conventional helicopter due to the large, articulated nacelles and the added wing; however, the improved cruise efficiency and speed improvement over helicopters is significant in certain uses. Speed and, more importantly, the benefit to overall response time is the principal virtue sought by the military forces that are using the tiltrotor. Tiltrotors are inherently less noisy in forward flight (airplane mode) than helicopters. This, combined with their increased speed, is expected to improve tiltrotors' utility in populated areas for commercial uses and reduce the threat of detection for military uses. In hovering flight, however, they are typically as loud as equally-sized helicopters. Noise simulations for a 90-passenger tiltrotor indicate lower cruise noise inside the cabin than a Bombardier Dash 8 airplane, although low-frequency vibrations may be higher.

Tiltrotors also provide substantially greater cruise altitude capability than helicopters. Tiltrotors can easily reach 6,000 m (20,000 ft) or more whereas helicopters typically do not exceed 3,000 m (10,000 ft) altitude. This feature will mean that some uses that have been commonly considered only for fixed-wing aircraft can now be supported with tiltrotors without need of a runway. A drawback is that a tiltrotor suffers considerably reduced payload when taking off from high altitude.

== Mono tiltrotor ==
A mono tiltrotor aircraft uses a tiltable rotating propeller, or coaxial proprotor, for lift and propulsion. For vertical flight the proprotor is angled to direct its thrust downwards, providing lift. In this mode of operation the craft is essentially identical to a helicopter. As the craft gains speed, the coaxial proprotor is slowly tilted forward, with the blades eventually becoming perpendicular to the ground. In this mode the wing provides the lift, and the wing's greater efficiency helps the tiltrotor achieve its high speed. In this mode, the craft is essentially a turboprop aircraft. A mono tiltrotor aircraft is different from a conventional tiltrotor in which the proprotors are mounted to the wing tips, in that the coaxial proprotor is mounted to the aircraft's fuselage. As a result of this structural efficiency, a mono tiltrotor exceeds the transport efficiency (speed times payload) of both a helicopter and a conventional tiltrotor. One design study concluded that if the mono tiltrotor could be technically realized, it would be half the size, one-third the weight, and nearly twice as fast as a helicopter.

In vertical flight, the mono tiltrotor uses controls very similar to a coaxial helicopter, such as the Kamov Ka-50. Yaw is controlled for instance by increasing the lift on the upper rotor while decreasing the lift on the lower rotor. Roll and pitch are provided through rotor cyclic. Vertical motion is controlled with conventional rotor blade blade pitch.

== List of tiltrotor aircraft ==
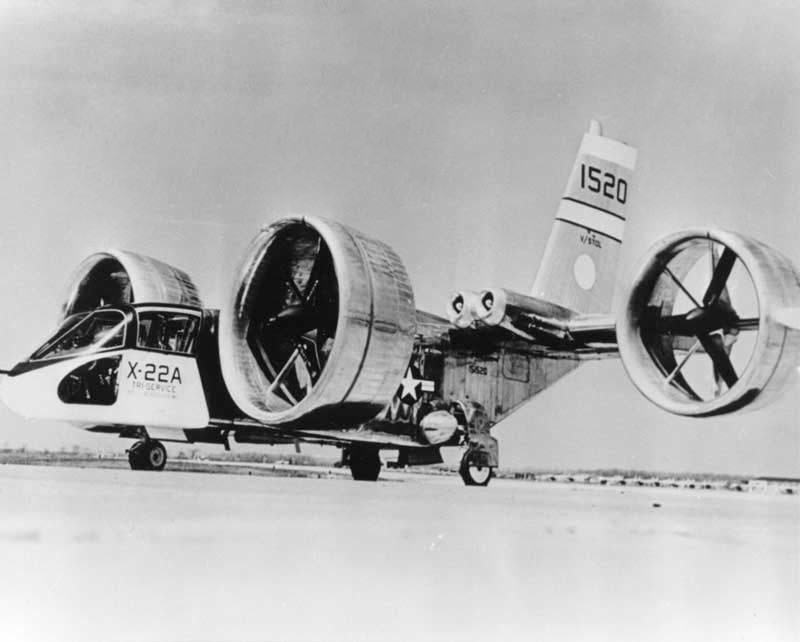
Bell X-22

- AgustaWestland AW609
- AgustaWestland Project Zero
- American Dynamics AD-150
- Bell XV-3
- Bell XV-15
- Bell Eagle Eye
- Bell MV-75 Cheyenne II
- Bell Boeing V-22 Osprey
- Curtiss-Wright X-19
- Focke-Achgelis Fa 269
- IAI Panther
- Transcendental Model 1-G
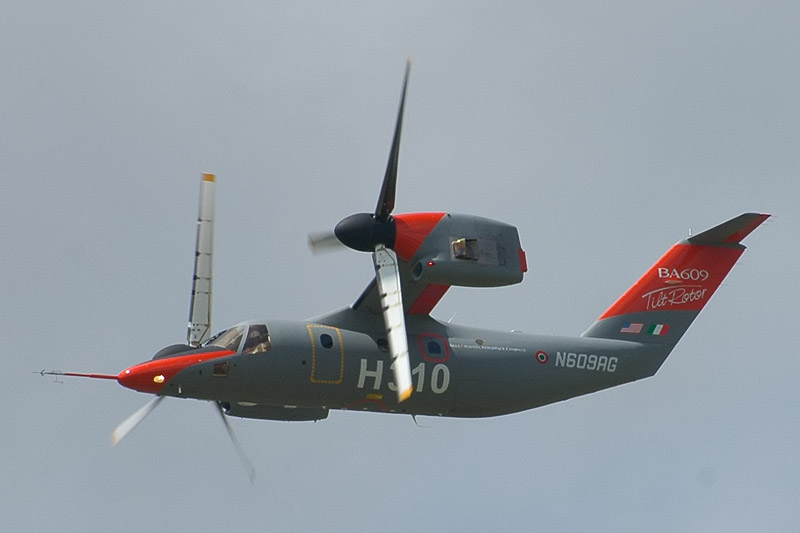
A BA609 (now AW609) in airplane mode at Paris Air Show 2007

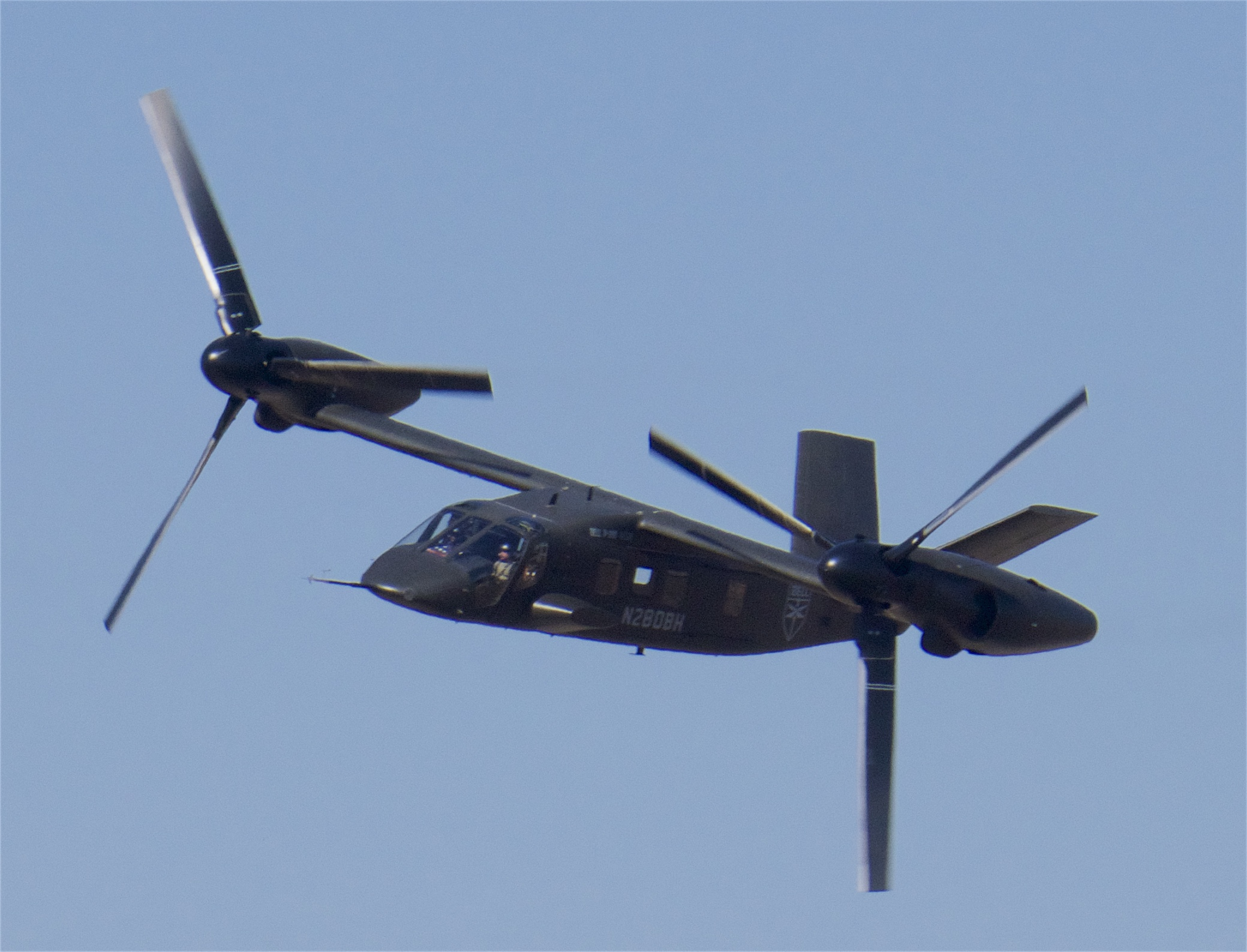
Bell MV-75 Cheyenne II

== See also ==
- Pitch drop-back
- Tiltjet
- Tiltwing
- Tailsitter
- PTOL
- Thrust vectoring

	Aerostat	Aerodyne		
	Lift: Lighter than air gas	Lift: Fixed wing	Lift: Unpowered rotor	Lift: Powered rotor
Unpowered free flight	(Free) balloon	Glider	Helicopter, etc. in autorotation	(None – see note 2)
Tethered (static or towed)	Tethered balloon	Kite	Rotor kite	(None – see note 2)
Powered	Airship	Airplane, ornithopter, etc.	Autogyro	Gyrodyne, helicopter
