= Curtiss-Wright X-19 =

Experimental VTOL tiltrotor quadcopter airplane

X-19
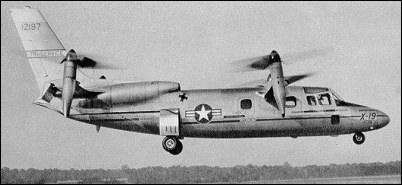
- X-19 in hovering flight

General information
- Type: Experimental VTOL aircraft
- National origin: United States
- Manufacturer: Curtiss-Wright
- Status: Canceled
- Number built: 2

History
- First flight: November 1963

The Curtiss-Wright X-19, company designation Model 200, is an American experimental tiltrotor aircraft of the early 1960s. It was noteworthy for being the last aircraft of any kind manufactured by Curtiss-Wright.

== Design and development ==
In March 1960 the Curtiss-Wright Corporation developed the X-100, a prototype for a new, vertical takeoff transport aircraft. The X-100 had a single turboshaft engine, which propelled two tilting-propellers, while at the tail swivelling nozzles used the engine's exhaust gases to give additional control for hovering or slow flight. Although sometimes classified as a tiltrotor aircraft, the design differed from the Bell VTOL XV tiltrotor designs. The X-19 utilized specially designed radial lift propellers, rather than helicopter-like rotors, for vertical takeoff and augmenting the lift provided by the wing structures.

From the X-100 Curtiss-Wright developed the larger X-200, of which the United States Air Force ordered two prototypes designated the X-19A.

The X-19 had fore and aft high-mounted tandem wings. Each wing mounted two 13 ft (4.0 m) propellers that could be rotated through 90 degrees, allowing the aircraft to take off and land like a helicopter. The propellers were driven by twin Avco Lycoming T55-L-5 turboshaft engines mounted in the fuselage.

== Operational history ==
The first flight of the X-19 took place in November 1963 (other sources give 26 June 1964). It was intended that the X-19 would be developed into a VTOL transport aircraft. However the first X-19 was destroyed in a crash on 25 August 1965, with no loss of life, and the program was subsequently cancelled; the second prototype was never completed. The second X-19 prototype is currently being stored in the restoration facilities at the National Museum of the United States Air Force in Dayton, Ohio.

The power transmission, power to weight requirements, flight mode transition and multi-axis control make VTOL aircraft design far more problematic than conventional fixed wing and even helicopter design. Like most pioneering tilt aircraft, the aerodynamic complexity of coupled pitch, roll, and yaw, and torque, particularly in transition from vertical takeoff to horizontal flight, made design of the X-19 extremely challenging. Ultimately, weaknesses in the power transmission gear boxes led to failure. Owing to design complexity, tiltrotor VTOL aircraft did not enter operational service until the Bell-Boeing V-22 Osprey introduction in 2007.

== Specifications (X-19) ==
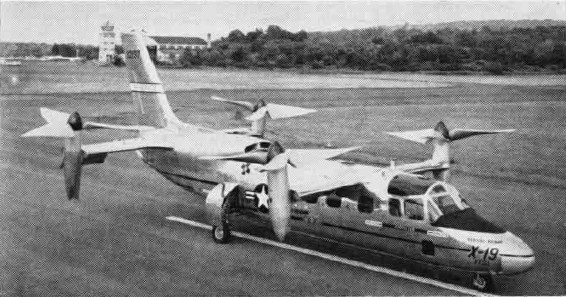
The X-19 in 1963.

Data from Jane's all the World's Aircraft 1965–66

General characteristics

- Crew: 2
- Capacity: 4 pax / 5,000 lb (2,300 kg) maximum

3,910 lb (1,770 kg) VTOL

- Length: 44 ft 5 in (13.54 m)
- Wingspan: 23 ft 6 in (7.16 m) rear wing

19.5 ft (5.9 m) forward wing

- Width: 34 ft 6 in (10.52 m) propeller tip to propeller tip on rear wing
- Height: 17 ft 0.25 in (5.1880 m)
- Wing area: 56.1 sq ft (5.21 m^{2}) forward wing

98.5 sq ft (9.15 m^{2}) rear wing

- Empty weight: 9,750 lb (4,423 kg)
- Max takeoff weight: 14,750 lb (6,690 kg) CTOL

13,600 lb (6,200 kg) VTOL

- Fuel capacity: 4,790 lb (2,170 kg) maximum fuel
- Powerplant: 2 × Lycoming T55-L-7 turboprop engines, 2,650 shp (1,980 kW) each
- Propellers: 3-bladed glass re-inforced plastic Curtiss-Wright radial lift force propellers, 13 ft 0 in (3.96 m) diameter

1,203 rpm for take-off; 955 rpm cruising

Performance

- Maximum speed: 400 kn (460 mph, 740 km/h) at 20,000 ft (6,100 m)
- Cruise speed: 347.6 kn (400.0 mph, 643.8 km/h) at 15,000 ft (4,600 m)
- Range: 450 nmi (520 mi, 830 km) with 1,000 lb (450 kg) payload VTOL

638.7 nmi (735.0 mi; 1,182.9 km) with 1,000 lb (450 kg) payload CTOL

- Rate of climb: 3,930 ft/min (20.0 m/s) at sea level and 13,660 lb (6,200 kg) AUW

== See also ==
Aircraft of comparable role, configuration, and era

- AgustaWestland AW609 – Twin-engine tiltrotor VTOL aircraft
- Bell XV-15 – American experimental tiltrotor aircraft
- Bell Boeing V-22 Osprey – Military transport tiltrotor
