= Mil Mi-30 =

Russian tiltrotor STOL/VTOL concept

Mi-30

General information
- Type: Tiltrotor
- National origin: Soviet Union
- Manufacturer: Mil
- Status: Study

The Mil Mi-30 Vintoplan was a Russian tiltrotor STOL/VTOL concept that originated in 1972. The Vintoplan would have been a transport aircraft for up to 19 passengers or two tons of cargo. Its purpose was to replace the Mi-8 and Mi-17 helicopters.

== Design and things ==
The first tiltrotor aircraft companies were founded in the 1940s; the Vintoplan project was picked up and continued by these companies a few years after the first development. The Mil Design Bureau closely followed the tiltrotor projects at Bell Helicopters, and the concept that Bell proposed seemed to them convincing. In 1972 Mil designers initiated a similar design, the Mi-30. At the beginning of the 1980s, scientists and helicopter designers assembled a design and several layouts for this complicated aircraft, the original design of the Mil Mi-30 Vintoplan was expected to use a TV3-117 turboshaft engine with a four-bladed propeller rotor on each wing. The original design of the Mil Mi-30 had several problems: Aeroelasticity, dynamics of construction, characteristics for the converter apparatuses, aerodynamics and flight dynamics. The Vintoplan went through several different designs and layouts, shifting from having 2 engines to 3 or 4 engines and back to 2 engines.

In 1981 an issued decree on the development of the Mi-30 Vintoplan made a proposal to the customer and institutions at MAP, shortly after the military approved of the Vintoplan but desired bigger, more powerful engines. In the development the weight capacity was raised to 3–5 tons, and the passenger limit was raised to 32. In 1986–1995 the Mil Mi-30 was included in the program of armaments. However, due to the collapse of the Soviet Union and its economy, the Mil Mi-30 did not succeed in the new age of technology.

The Mi-30 Vintoplan was included in the 5-year plan in the Soviet Union from 1989 to 1995, but the project was never completed. In the last year, OKB experts in the Soviet Union designed three different models of the Mil Mi-30, each with unique designs- Mi-30S, Mi-30D, and the Mi-30L.

An unmanned tiltrotor project was started in Russia in 2015.

== See also ==
Aircraft of comparable role, configuration, and era

- Bell Boeing V-22 Osprey

Related lists

- List of VTOL aircraft
