= Transcendental Model 1-G =

1950s American prototype tiltrotor aircraft

Model 1-G
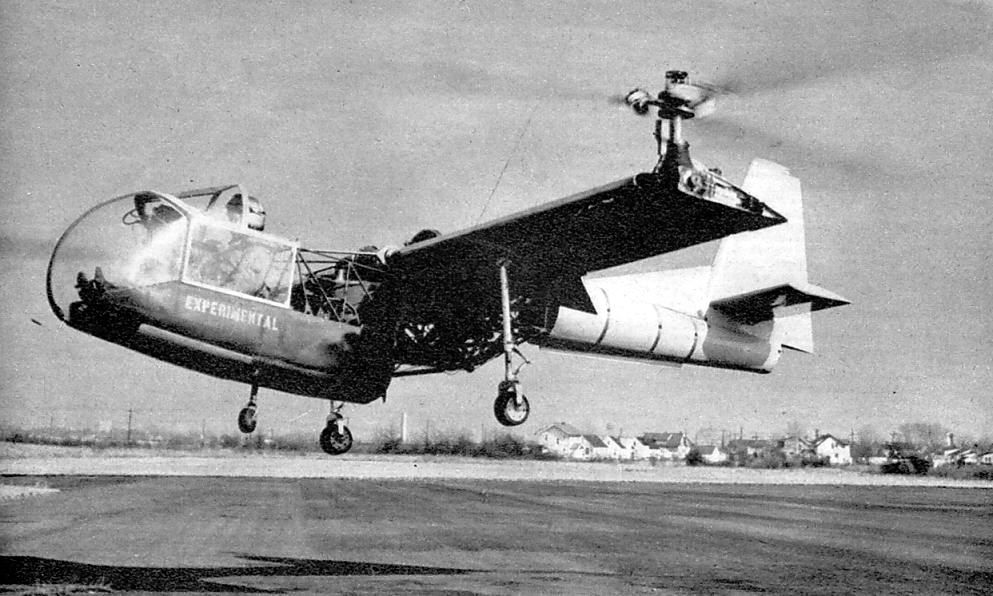

General information
- Type: Experimental tiltrotor aircraft
- National origin: United States
- Manufacturer: Transcendental Aircraft Corporation
- Status: Prototype
- Number built: 1

History
- First flight: July 6, 1954 (first free flight)

The Transcendental Model 1-G was an experimental American tiltrotor prototype of the 1950s. It was a single-seat aircraft powered by a piston engine, and was the first tiltrotor to fly. A single example was built, which was destroyed in a crash in 1955.

== Design and development ==
The Transcendental Aircraft Company was founded in January 1947 at New Castle, Delaware by Mario Guerrieri and Bob Lichten, two employees of Kellet Aircraft, to develop the Model 1-G, on which they had begun design work in 1945. Their design was a small cantilever monoplane powered by a single 160 hp (120 kW) Lycoming O-290-A air-cooled flat-four engine positioned in the fuselage that drove two 3-blade rotors at the tips of the wings via a two-speed reduction gearbox. Two 1/6 hp (0.12 kW) electric motors were used to tilt the rotors, with the rotors linked by a shaft running through the wing to ensure that both rotors would be tilted at the same angle. A steel tube forward fuselage carried the single pilot, engine and gearbox, with the open cockpit positioned forward of the engine and gearbox. An aluminum alloy monocoque tail boom carried the aircraft's tail surfaces. A fixed tricycle landing gear was fitted.

The aircraft's rotors were controlled with cyclic and collective controls as used by a helicopter, for use in helicopter mode, while conventional ailerons, elevators and a rudder were fitted to the aircraft's wings and tail to control the aircraft in airplane mode.

Development was slow owing to a shortage of funds, with the prototype sufficiently complete to allow testing on a ground test rig in 1951, although it was badly damaged later that year when the rotors disintegrated on the test bed during the first run at full revolutions. A series of contracts from the United States Air Force (USAF) allowed development to continue, and for the Model 1-G to be rebuilt into a form suitable for flight testing.

Lichten left Transcendental in 1948, and, in September 1952, Guerrieri sold his interests in the company to William E. Cobey Jr., a Kellett Aircraft Corporation vibrations expert who continued the development of the Model 1-G. With some funding provided by a 1952 Army/Air Force contract for flight data reports and analyses, hover testing of the 1750 lb. Model 1-G began on June 15, 1954. A second, improved tiltrotor, the Model 2, was later developed (see below).

=== Model 2 ===
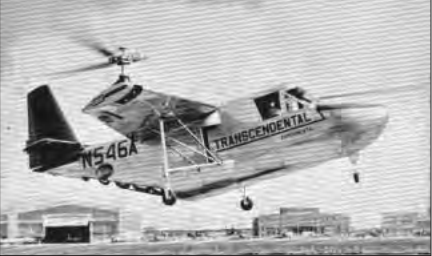
Transcendental Model 2 convertiplane in flight. NASA Ames Research Center photograph (AD98-0209-19).

The two-seat Transcendental Model 2 was a larger and more powerful development of the earlier Model 1-G, with an all-up weight of 2,249 pounds (1,020 kg). Developed by William E. Cobey Jr., the Model 2 first flew in late 1956 and demonstrated further progress in tiltrotor flight testing.

Despite these advances, funding limitations resulting from the withdrawal of United States Air Force support prevented expansion of the flight envelope, and the program was terminated in 1957.

== Operational history ==
The Model 1-G, registered N2704A made its first tethered flight at Bellanca Airfield New Castle on June 15, 1954, following this by the first untethered free flight on July 6. The first in-flight rotor-tilting took place in December that year, and by April 1955, it was flying with 35 degrees of forward tilt and had reached speeds of 100 kn (190 km/h; 120 mph). On July 20, 1955, N2704A suffered a control system failure causing it to crash into the Delaware River. Although the pilot escaped with only minor injuries, the aircraft was wrecked.

By the time of its loss, the Model 1-G had carried out over 100 flights, accumulating 23 flight hours. Although it never made a complete transition to and from wing-borne flight, tilt angles of 75 degrees were reached during testing, with more than 90% of lift generated by the aircraft's wings. Transcendental received a further contract from the USAF in 1956, which allowed it to design and build a new tiltrotor, the more powerful and aerodynamically refined Transcendental Model 2, which flew late in 1956. US Government funds were then directed to the Bell XV-3, however, causing the Model 2 to be abandoned with Transcendental being sold to Republic Aviation.

== Specifications (performance estimated) ==
Data from Jane's All The World's Aircraft 1955–56

General characteristics

- Crew: 1
- Length: 26 ft 0 in (7.92 m)
- Wingspan: 21 ft 0 in (6.40 m)
- Height: 9 ft (2.7 m)
- Wing area: 63 sq ft (5.9 m^{2})
- Aspect ratio: 7:1
- Airfoil: NACA 23015
- Empty weight: 1,450 lb (658 kg)
- Gross weight: 1,750 lb (794 kg)
- Fuel capacity: 14 US gal (53 L; 12 imp gal)
- Powerplant: 1 × Lycoming O-290-A four-cylinder air-cooled horizontally-opposed piston engine, 160 hp (120 kW)
- Main rotor diameter: 2 × 17 ft 0 in (5.18 m)
- Main rotor area: 454 sq ft (42.2 m^{2})

Performance

- Maximum speed: 160 mph (260 km/h, 140 kn) as airplane, 120 miles per hour (190 km/h; 100 kn) as helicopter
- Endurance: 1 hour 30 minutes
- Service ceiling: 5,000 ft (1,500 m)
