= Baldwin Mono Tiltrotor =

Mono Tiltrotor
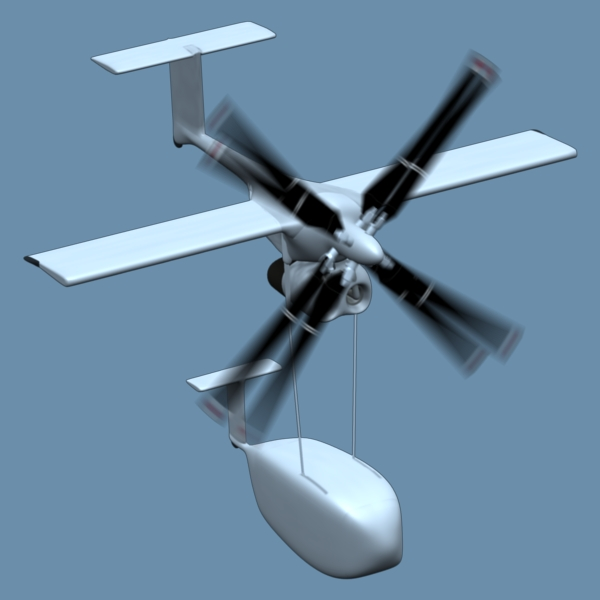
- The Mono Tiltrotor Scaled Demonstrator (MTR-SD). The cargo pod is suspended from the unmanned fuselage.

General information
- Type: Tiltrotor
- National origin: United States of America
- Manufacturer: Baldwin Technology LLC
- Designer: G. D. Baldwin.

The Baldwin Mono Tiltrotor project is a research effort into a tiltrotor aircraft that uses only one rotor. Like other tiltrotor configurations, the mono tiltrotor combines the vertical lift capability and structural efficiency of a helicopter with the speed and range of a fixed-wing aircraft.

== Development ==
Work on the Mono Tiltrotor (MTR) was initiated in 2004. A concept study was performed under an Office of Naval Research contract and this study concluded that the MTR, if technically realizable, would be half the size and one-third the weight of legacy helicopter concepts for a 1,000-nautical-mile (1,900 km) mission.

In 2005 and 2006, design of the 9400 pound gross weight MTR Scaled Demonstrator (MTR-SD) was performed under a United States Army contract at the US Army Research Laboratories. This work included the following tasks: engine selection; transmission design; hub, controls, and blade preliminary design; comprehensive performance and aeroelastic analysis; analysis of critical stress concentrations; conceptual design of the fixed wing and cargo pod; wind tunnel testing of wing deployment; and longitudinal static stability analysis from hover through cruise. This work resulted in a definition of each component's and each subassembly's weight, moments of inertia, location on the aircraft, and aerodynamic drag. The predicted range and speed were derived from this aircraft design data.

In 2007 and 2008, demonstrations and validations of the MTR-SD design were performed under an Army contract. The three unprecedented hardware mechanisms of the MTR were demonstrated in small scale flight tests: 1) the aerodynamically deployed wing panels; 2) the pitch axis suspended cargo pod; and 3) the tilting centerline rotor. Furthermore, a 7-foot (2.1 m) diameter rotor remote control MTR Functional Demonstrator (MTR-FD) that integrates these three features was designed, built, and hover tested. Bell Helicopter Textron used proprietary methods for advanced concept design and analysis to validate the 25-foot-diameter (7.6 m) rotor MTR-SD design. Bell Helicopter's assessment resulted in validations of the MTR-SD vertical lift capacity, engine power required and power available, cruise thrust and propulsive efficiency, aircraft weight, and airplane mode cruise lift. Bell Helicopter also generated and reported MTR-SD flight dynamics data. A computational fluid dynamics drag assessment was performed, and in combination with the Bell Helicopter assessment this validated MTR-SD projected drag and aircraft cruise range performance.

In early 2009, a Concept of Operations (CONOPS) video was produced showing the MTR-SD performing the missions specified in the United States Marine Corps - Cargo Unmanned Aircraft System - Universal Need Statement (USMC Cargo UAS UNS) and in the Office of Naval Research – Cargo Unmanned Aircraft System – Request for Information (ONR Cargo UAS RFI). In early 2010, under a multi-year contract with the Office of Naval Research (ONR), the CONOPs and aircraft design were refined for Navy shipboard compatibility.

On October 2, 2010, the first full conversion between helicopter and airplane modes of flight was achieved using a revised Mono Tiltrotor - Functional Demonstrator (MTR-FD), 4 foot diameter, small-scale remote control model.

== Specifications ==
Data from Baldwin Technology Company, LLC.

General characteristics

- Crew: 0
- Capacity: 3,000 lb (1,360 kg)
- Length: 24 ft (7.3 m)
- Wingspan: 33 ft (10 m)
- Height: 12.5 ft (3.8 m)
- Wing area: 165 sq ft (15.3 m^{2})
- Empty weight: 4,900 lb (2,223 kg)
- Gross weight: 9,400 lb (4,264 kg)
- Powerplant: 1 × LHTEC T800 turboshaft engine

Performance

- Cruise speed: 230 mph (370 km/h, 200 kn)

== See also ==
Aircraft of comparable role, configuration, and era

- Boeing A160 Hummingbird
