= AgustaWestland Project Zero =

2010s Italian electric tiltrotor aircraft

Project Zero
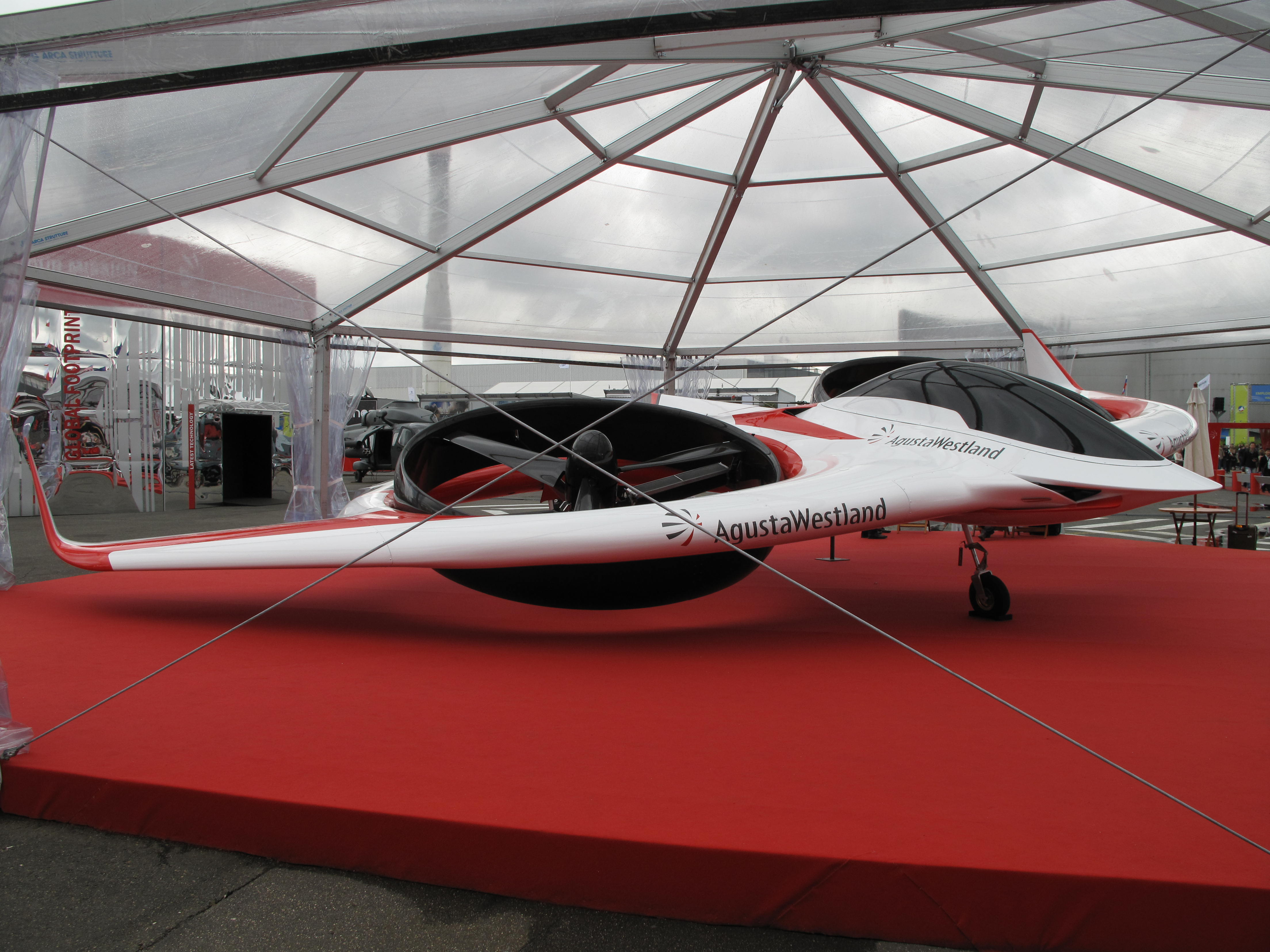

General information
- Type: Experimental tiltrotor VTOL aircraft
- National origin: Italy
- Manufacturer: AgustaWestland
- Status: Under development / flight testing

History
- First flight: June 2011

The AgustaWestland Project Zero is a hybrid tiltrotor/Lift fan aircraft. It has been developed by AgustaWestland as a technology demonstrator, and is used to investigate all-electric propulsion and other advanced technologies. It is the world's first electric tiltrotor aircraft.

== Development ==
=== Origins ===
In December 2010, AgustaWestland's management approved the formation of a team under James Wang with the intention of producing a technology demonstrator incorporating as many new innovations as possible on a single airframe. Speaking in 2013, Wang noted that electric technologies were rapidly advancing, and that the function of Project Zero was to achieve readiness with electric aircraft technologies: "Rather than waiting for the battery to become even better, then working on electric aircraft technology, the team has positioned itself to be ready for the next generation of batteries".

At AgustaWestland and its partner companies, a total of two dozen full-time engineers worked on the project in a skunkworks-style of development at AgustaWestland's Cascina Costa facility in Italy. According to Wang, those appointed to the team were handpicked, and were typically young and passionate; each member had a specific specialty in one area. The team quickly decided that, instead of pursuing an electric-powered but otherwise conventional airplane or helicopter, a more radical approach would be adopted: A twin-rotor electric tiltrotor, lacking any transmission or swashplates. Wang summarised the team's philosophy as "Anything that is bordline impossible, we want to do".

Noting that the AgustaWestland AW169's development had been completed in under four years, management decided to challenge the team to complete the project within a single year, including initial flight testing. The team worked almost continuously, 24 hours per day and seven days per week for the initial six-month period. Team members did not wait on emails or voicemail, instead going directly to one another in person, being based in the same office, this also assisted in maintaining secrecy - direct teamwork in this fashion was heavily encouraged. AgustaWestland's Advanced Concepts Group performed extensive model testing for the project; this involved the creation of multiple flight-capable 1/10th-scale models, which were flown to test the extremes of the flight envelope due to the aircraft's atypical shape. The use of computer aided design (CAD) tools was also essential to meeting the extremely fast schedule of the program; computational fluid dynamics and finite element modeling were both used extensively.

Various companies in Italy, the UK, the U.S. and Japan worked on the design and/or manufacturing of elements of Project Zero, including four different branches of Finmeccanica. Ansaldo Breda designed a custom-built electric motor inverter and accompanying motor control algorithm, Selex ES provided the High-Integrity Flight Control Computer and the Actuator Control Unit. Lucchi R.Elettromeccanica custom-built the axial flux permanent magnetic motors; Rotor Systems Research LLC worked in conjunction with AgustaWestland on the aerodynamic design of the rotor blades. Lola Composites produced the composite material from which most of the exterior surfaces are made of Carbon-fiber-reinforced polymer (CFRP), while UCHIDA manufactured the composite structure for the rotor blades, shrouds, and spokes. Stile Bertone worked to develop the aesthetic and aerodynamic styling of the aircraft.

The designation Project Zero was derived from an observation that this was a unique internal project with no comparable counterpart within the company's history. The development of Project Zero was conducted within a short amount of time; the time between the start of the design phase and the first flight of the demonstrator itself was less than six months. In order to ensure that tangible benefits from the project were made, it was decided that a full-scale aircraft must be produced and flown. In June 2011, a full-scale demonstrator performed an initial tethered flight at Cascina Costa, Italy. According to Wang, there was no need for any redesigning or corrective work "Everything worked - the whole design - first time".

=== Reveal and further development ===
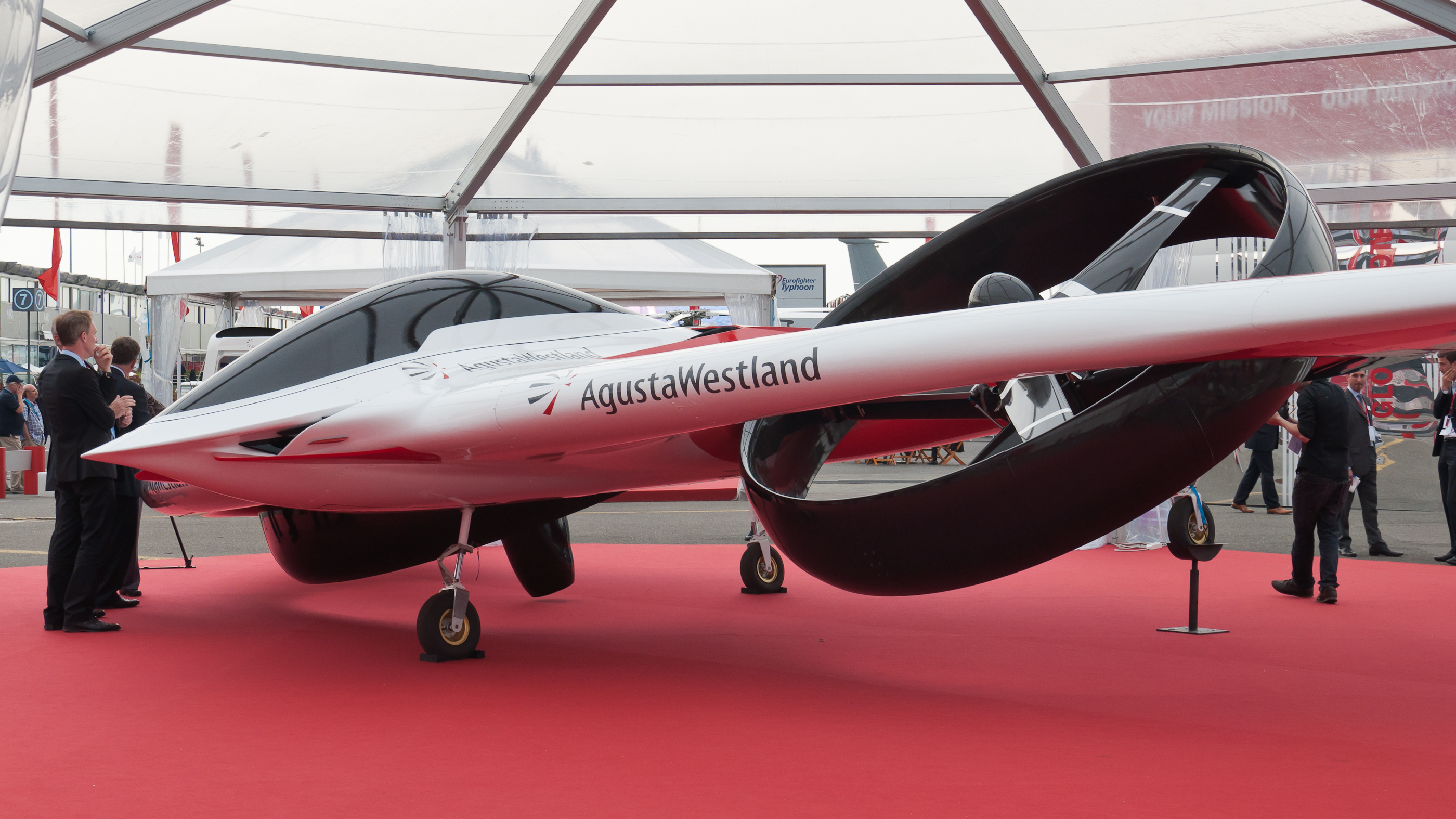
Project Zero on static display at the 2013 Paris Air Show

On 4 March 2013, the existence of the program was announced to the public at the Helicopter Association International (HAI) Heli-Expo. In June 2013, the aircraft was publicly displayed at the Paris Air Show. In early 2014, the Project Zero team was awarded AHS International's prestigious 2014 Grover E. Bell Award—named for Larry Bell's late brother—given to the individual or organization that has fostered and encouraged research and experimentation in helicopter development.

Following the flight testing period, AgustaWestland set about learning from the project and studying means to transfer technologies produced into its existing rotorcraft product line. It has been emphasised that Project Zero itself is not a product, but an investment in technologies to benefit the wider company. In 2016, it was noted that the active blade control system developed for Project Zero, which removes the need for a swash plate and a separate vibration-damping system, was to undergo flight testing on an AgustaWestland AW139; separately, the flight control laws used by Project Zero shall be used for a future tiltrotor project by AgustaWestland.

Various alternative propulsion arrangements for Project Zero have been envisioned by the Advanced Concepts Group, including hybrid diesel propulsion, the incorporation of fuel cells, and other unspecified technologies. In its original configuration, ten minutes flight time is the current operational limit; speaking in 2016, Wang stated that he is hopeful that battery technology will advance within a decade to support a 100-minute operating time.

== Design ==
Project Zero is an unconventional electric-propelled convertiplane of tiltrotor configuration. It is an advanced demonstrator, intended to explore and showcase the capabilities of electric propulsion in aviation. The aircraft is powered by rechargeable batteries. AgustaWestland has stated that, when furnished with a suitable powerplant, the aircraft would be capable of speeds equivalent of traditional tiltrotor designs and possess a typical cruising height double that of a conventional helicopter. The technology demonstrator has not been optimised for production. It can either be flown by a single pilot seated within the cockpit, or alternatively operated as an unmanned aerial vehicle.

Key to Project Zero is the innovative propulsion system that it was developed to demonstrate and test. The two large rotors of the aircraft are driven by advanced electric motors, which are in turn powered by energy stored in batteries The all-electric design eliminates the need for a transmission, as used on conventional aircraft; it also operates with low acoustic and thermal signatures and without a dependency on oxygen. On the ground, the batteries may be recharged by tilting the rotors into the wind to act as turbines. The demonstrator was designed to accommodate numerous different energy sources for the electric motors; an alternative hybrid propulsion option also exists, this uses a lightweight diesel engine to drive a generator to provide electricity for the motors, which was developed by ORAL Engineering. During cruise flight, the majority of the lift is provided by the wings; the outer wings are detachable, which could be useful for shorter range missions mainly using the 'helicopter mode' of flight.

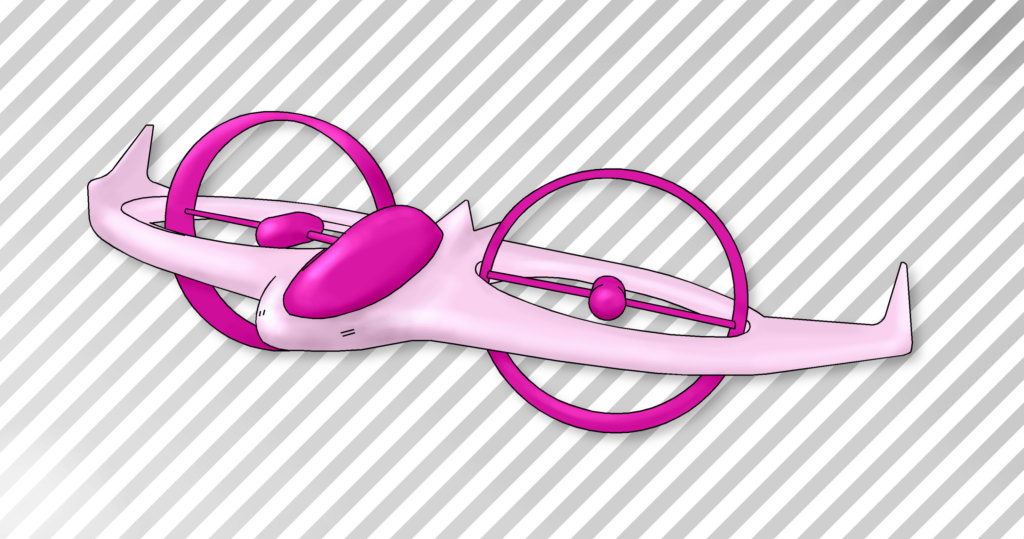
Depiction of Project Zero

In excess of 80 percent of the aircraft's composition is composite materials, including all of the skin, rotor blades, shroud, and spokes; the structure is almost entirely aluminium and carbon. Materials were selected on the basis of providing the greatest speed at reasonable weight and finance costs. According to the company, the aircraft "employs no hydraulics, doesn't burn fossil fuel and generates zero emissions." In place of hydraulics, electromechanical actuators have been used for functions such as the retraction of the undercarriage, tilting the nacelles, and actuating the aircraft's elevons; these actuators were purpose-developed by Microtecnica.

Key technologies of Project Zero have been patented; a European Patent, EP2551190 (A1), was filed on 29 July 2011 and granted 30 January 2013, while patents (listing James Wang as the inventor) were also granted in parallel in the United States, US2013026303 (A1); Other patents were filed in Korea (KR20130014450 (A)), Japan (JP2013032147 (A)), and China (CN102897317 (A)).

== Operational history ==
In June 2011, the unmanned demonstrator conducted its first tethered flight at AgustaWestland's Cascina Costa facility in Italy. It was flown in secured areas multiple times in 2011 and 2012, including flights with and without the ducted shrouds around its tilting rotors; a further modification included an alternative and more advanced set of rotor blades with a non-linear twist and custom airfoils being installed. Flight testing allowed for the fine-tuning of the propulsion system, which resulted in a 30 per cent gain in effective power.

Project Zero has made numerous public appearances since being revealed in March 2013. Flight testing has also continued, this has focused on 1/3rd-scale models rather than the full-scale demonstrator due to the limited flight endurance it possesses. In February 2016, it was announced that a hybrid drive system would be installed on the full-scale aircraft, this is aimed at extending the flight endurance from 10 minutes to 35–45 minutes.

== See also ==
External videos
- News coverage of Project Zero at the Paris Air Show 2013
- News report in 2016 on Project Zero

Related lists

- List of VTOL aircraft
