= Bell XV-3 =

Experimental tiltrotor aircraft to explore convertiplane technologies

XV-3
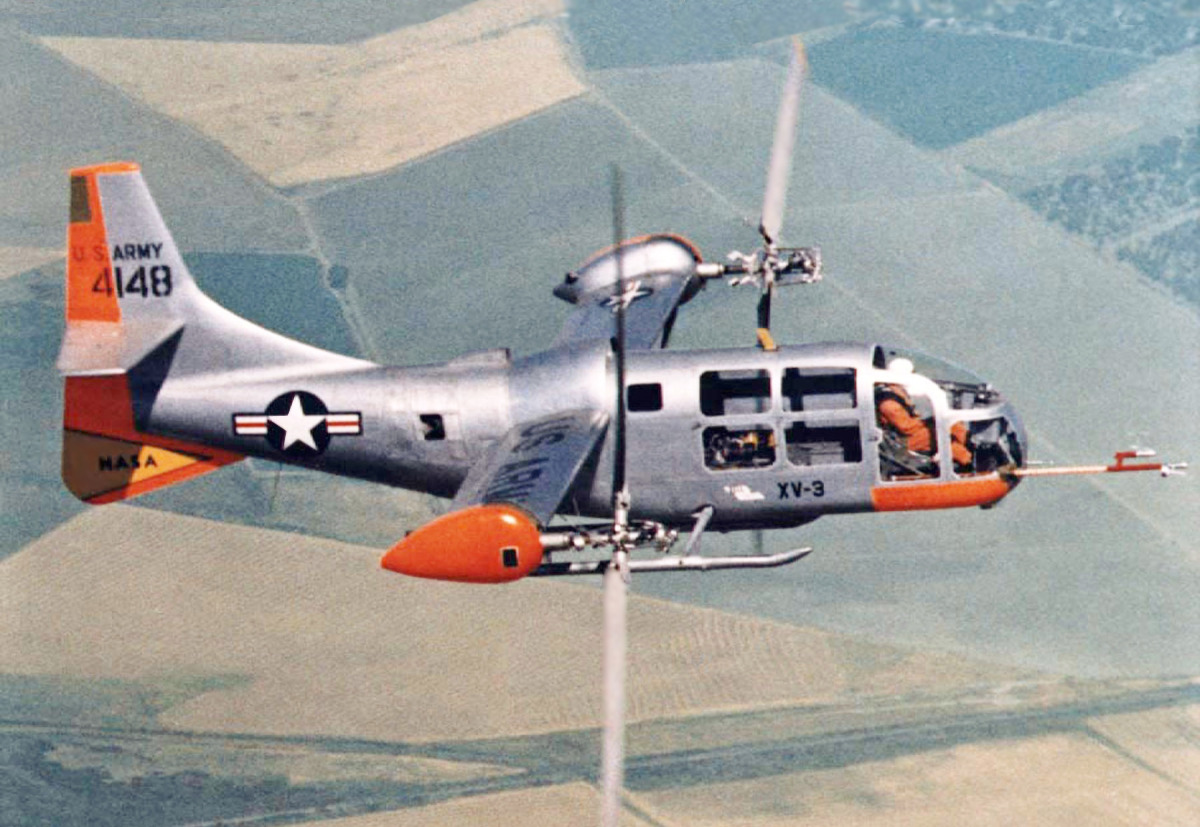
- The second Bell XV-3 during flight testing (c.1959)

General information
- Type: Experimental VTOL aircraft
- National origin: United States
- Manufacturer: Bell Helicopter
- Primary user: US Air Force and Army Joint Research Project
- Number built: 2

History
- First flight: 11 August 1955

The Bell XV-3 (Bell 200) is an American tiltrotor aircraft developed by Bell Helicopter for a joint research program between the United States Air Force and the United States Army in order to explore convertiplane technologies. The XV-3 featured an engine mounted in the fuselage with driveshafts transferring power to two-bladed rotor assemblies mounted on the wingtips. The wingtip rotor assemblies were mounted to tilt 90 degrees from vertical to horizontal, designed to allow the XV-3 to take off and land like a helicopter but fly at faster airspeeds, similar to a conventional fixed-wing aircraft.

The XV-3 was first flown on 11 August 1955. The first prototype use three blade rotors, and had issue with flutter crashing two months after its first flight. Tests were conducted on the second prototype with 2-blade rotors and flew successfully.

Although it was limited in performance compared to later types, the aircraft successfully demonstrated the tiltrotor concept, accomplishing 110 transitions from helicopter to airplane mode between December 1958 and July 1962. The XV-3 program ended when the remaining aircraft was severely damaged in a wind tunnel accident on 20 May 1966. The data and experience from the XV-3 program were key elements used to successfully develop the Bell XV-15, which later paved the way for the V-22 Osprey.

The remaining prototype survived to the 21st century when it was restored by Bell, with a two-year restoration that included engineers that worked on the XV-3 originally. It was then transferred to the National Museum of the United States Air Force in Dayton, Ohio, where it was put on display.

== Design and development ==
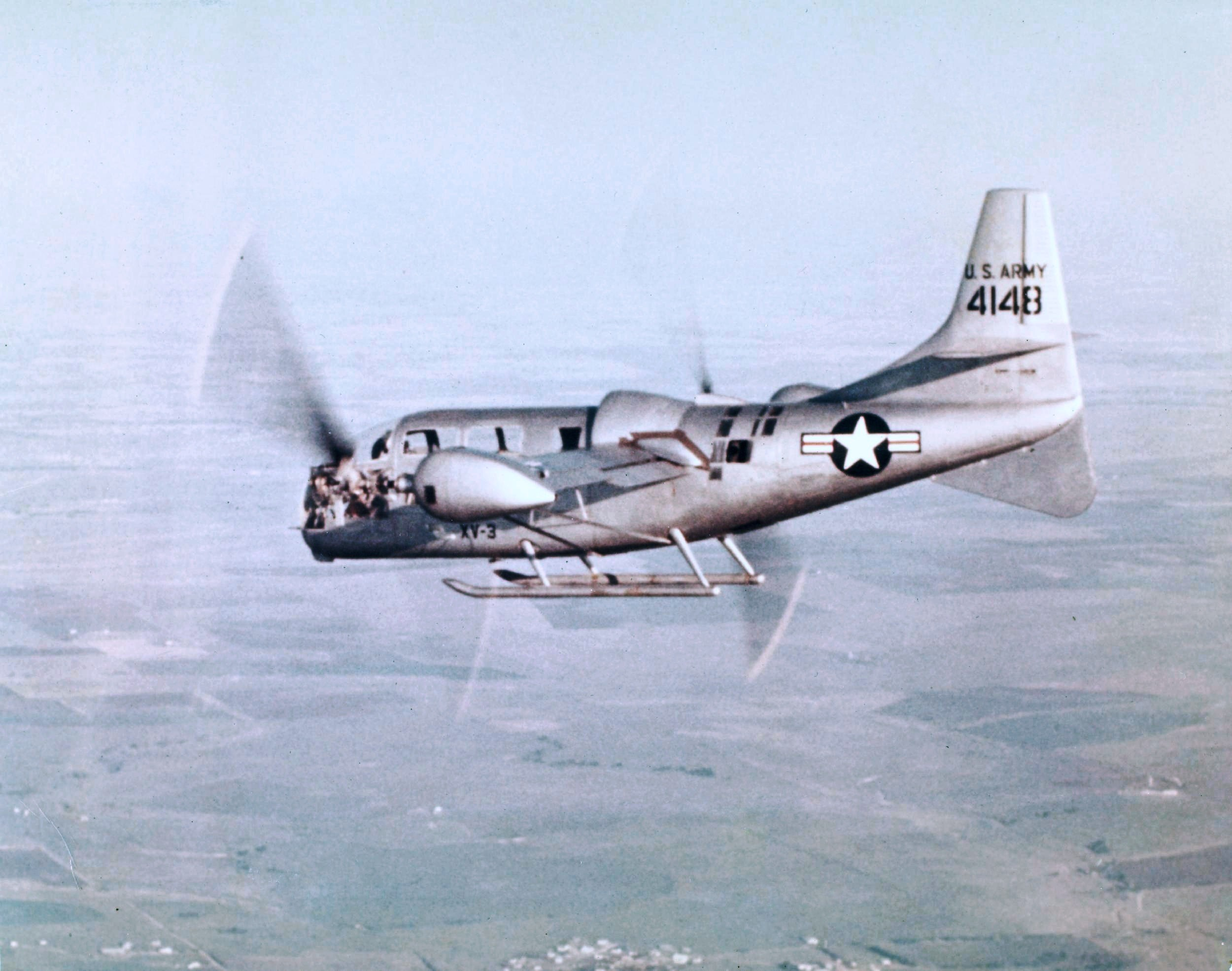
XV-3 in forward flight

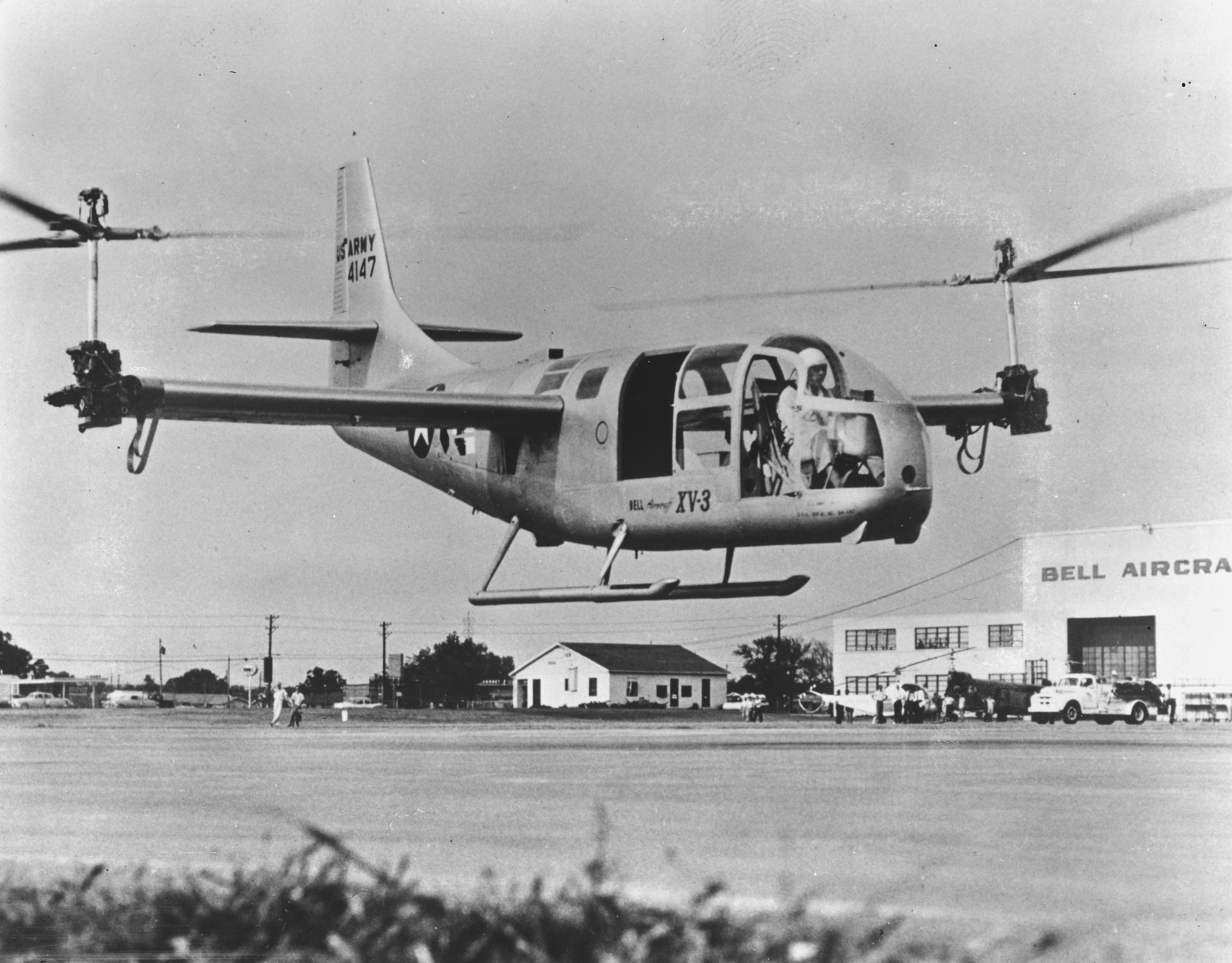
Bell XV-3 in a hover, 1955. This was first version with 3-blade rotors and crashed.

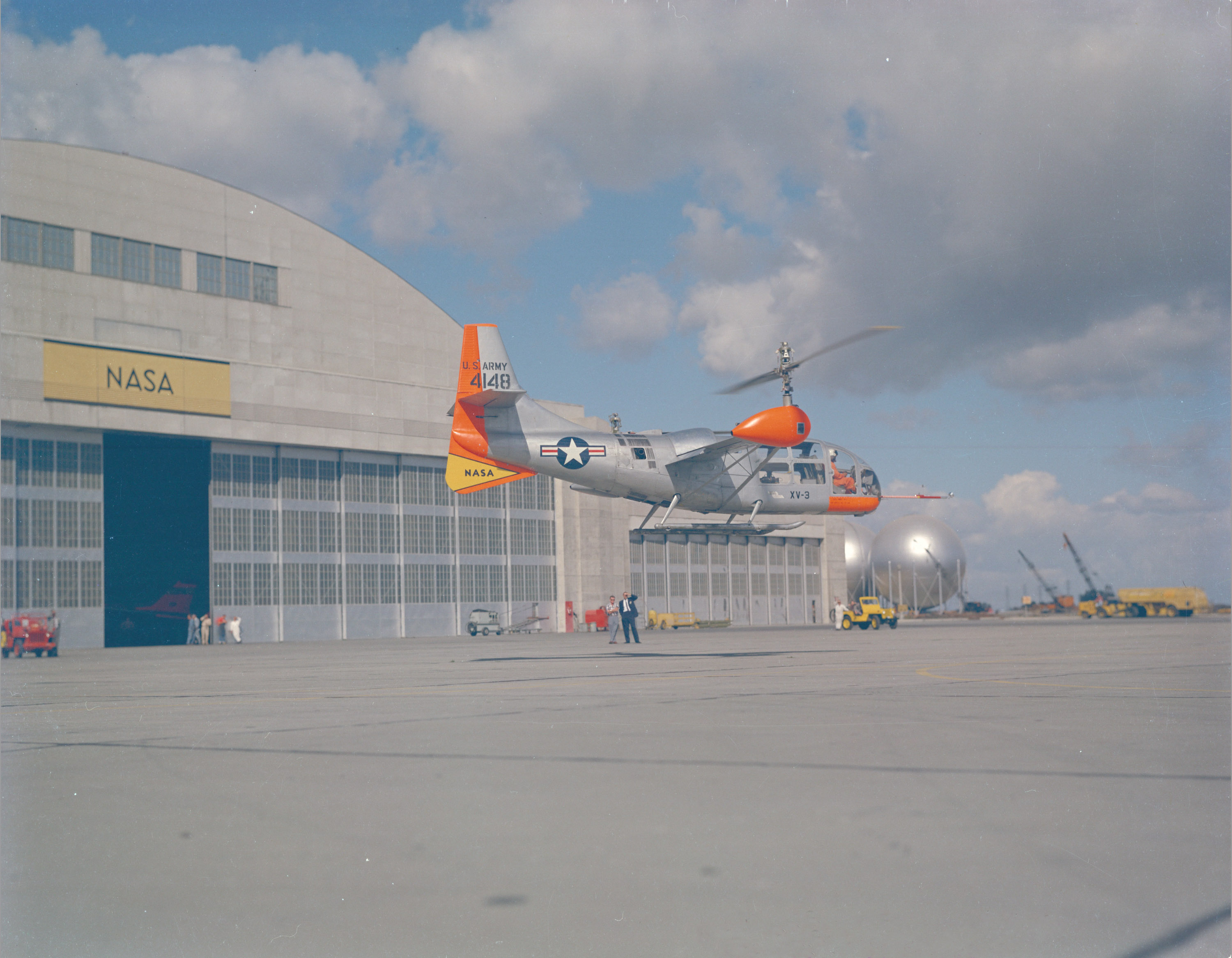
XV-3 test, in vertical flight with 2 blade rotors

In 1951, the Army and Air Force announced the Convertible Aircraft Program and released the Request for Proposals (RFP) to solicit designs from the aircraft industry. In October 1953, Bell Helicopter was awarded a development contract to produce two aircraft for testing purposes. The original military designation was XH-33, classifying it as a helicopter, but its designation was changed to XV-3 in the convertiplane series. The designation was changed once again in 1962 to XV-3A when the V-prefix was changed to mean VTOL. The leading designers were Bob Lichten and Kenneth Wernicke.

The first XV-3 (serial number 54-147) flew on 11 August 1955 with Bell Chief Test Pilot Floyd Carlson at the controls. On 18 August 1955, the aircraft experienced a hard landing when the rotor developed dynamic instability. Bell attempted to remedy the situation, and flight testing resumed on 29 March 1956 after additional ground runs. Bell continued to expand the flight envelope of the XV-3, but on 25 July 1956, the same rotor instability occurred again. Flight testing of the XV-3 resumed in late September 1956. Then, on 25 October 1956, the aircraft crashed when the test pilot blacked out due to extremely high cockpit vibrations. The vibrations resulted when the rotor shafts were moved 17 degrees forward from vertical. The test pilot, Dick Stansbury, was seriously injured, and the aircraft was damaged beyond repair.

Bell modified the second XV-3 (serial number 54-148) by replacing the three-bladed rotors with two-bladed rotors, and after taking extensive precautions, the second XV-3 began testing at the National Advisory Committee for Aeronautics' (NACA) Ames Aeronautical Laboratory wind tunnel facility on 18 July 1957. Flight testing for aircraft #2 began on 21 January 1958 at Bell's facility. By April, the aircraft had expanded the flight envelope to 127 miles per hour (204 km/h) as well as demonstrating full autorotation landings and 30-degrees forward transitions with the rotor pylons. On 6 May 1958, another instance of rotor instability occurred when the pylons were advanced to 40-degrees forward pylon angle, and the XV-3 was grounded once more. The XV-3 returned to the Ames wind tunnel in October 1958 to collect more data before it could be flown again. As a result of the wind tunnel testing, the rotor diameter was reduced, wing structure was increased and strengthened, and the rotor controls were stiffened.

The XV-3 resumed flight testing at Bell's facility on 12 December 1958. On 18 December 1958, Bell test pilot Bill Quinlan accomplished the first dynamically stable full conversion to airplane mode, and on 6 January 1959, Air Force Captain Robert Ferry became the first military pilot to complete a tiltrotor conversion to airplane mode. Flight testing at the Bell facilities was completed on 24 April 1959, and the aircraft was shipped to Edwards Air Force Base. The military flight testing of the XV-3 began on 14 May 1959. Promoted to the rank of Major, Robert Ferry would coauthor the report on the military flight evaluations, conducted from May to July 1959, noting that despite the deficiencies of the design, the "fixed-wing tilt-prop," or tiltrotor, was a practical application for rotorcraft.

Following the completion of the joint service testing, the aircraft was returned to the Ames facility, where on 12 August 1959, Fred Drinkwater became the first NASA test pilot to complete the full conversion of a tiltrotor to airplane mode. On 8 August 1961, Army Major E. E. Kluever became the first Army pilot to fly a tiltrotor aircraft. Testing would continue through July 1962 as NASA and Bell completed wind tunnel testing to study pitch-flap coupling exhibited by the tiltrotor in an effort to predict and eliminate the aeroelastic dynamic rotor instability (referred to simply as pylon whirl) that had caused problems throughout the program.

In April 1966, Bell Helicopter aerodynamicist Dr. Earl Hall published an analysis of the XV-3 program data explaining the tiltrotor aircraft pylon whirl instability. In order to establish Hall's findings and develop a computer model, NASA agreed to conduct wind tunnel testing at the Ames 40 × 80 wind tunnel. As the engineers were completing the last planned test, a wingtip failure caused both rotors to fail, resulting in severe damage of the XV-3 and damage to the wind tunnel. On 14 June 1966, NASA Ames Research Center announced the completion of XV-3 testing. The XV-3 had accomplished a total of 250 flights, accumulated 125 flight hours, and completed 110 full conversions.

== Surviving aircraft ==
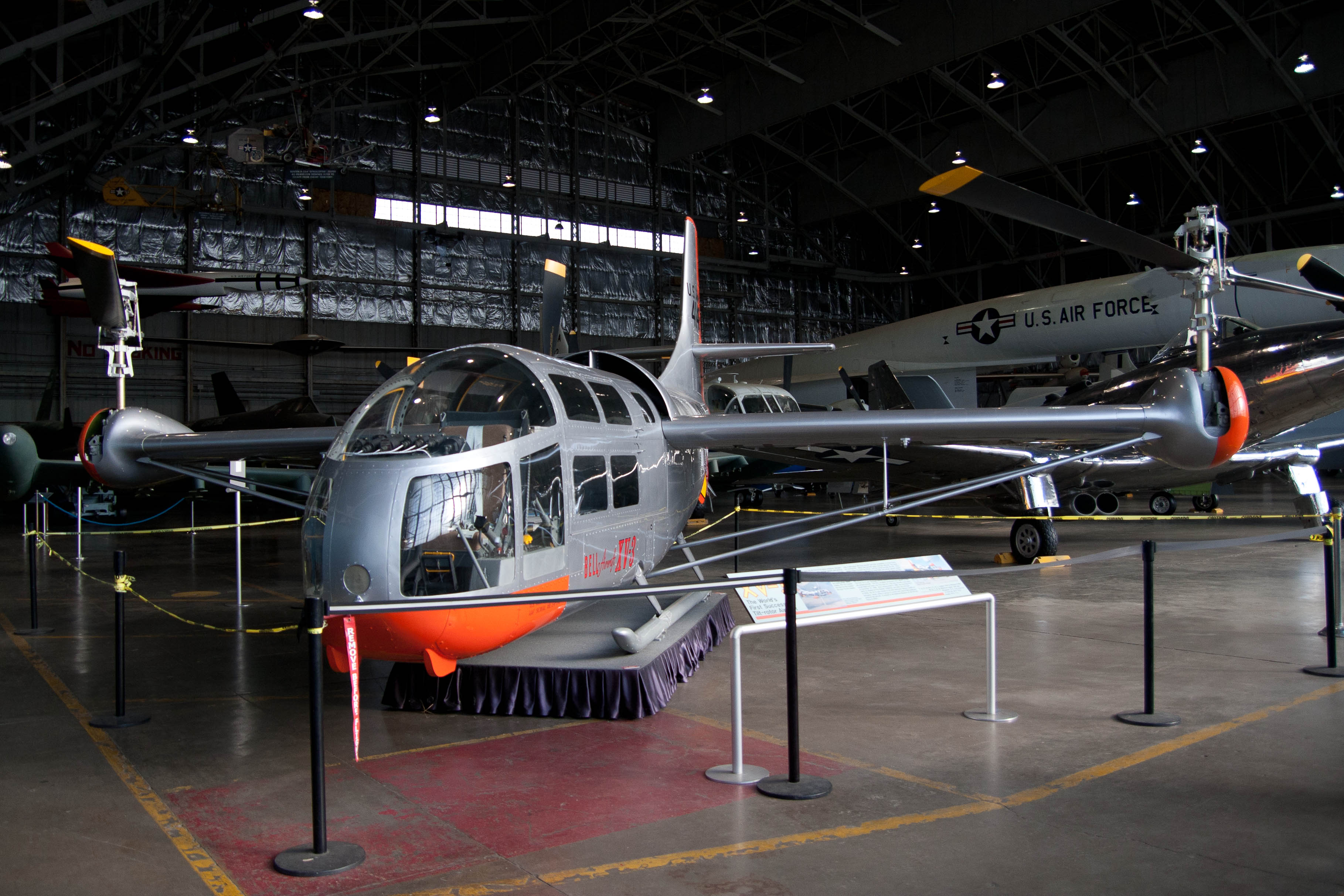
XV-3, 54-148, on display at the National Museum of the USAF (2012)

In late 1966, the sole remaining XV-3, serial number 54-148, was moved to outside storage at Davis–Monthan Air Force Base in Tucson, Arizona. In 1984, the Bell XV-15 flight test team discovered the aircraft stored outside the Army's Aviation Museum during the XV-15 visit to Fort Rucker, Alabama, as part of a demonstration tour. 54-148 was repaired by December 1986, with Army support and the leadership of former Bell XV-3 engineer Claude Leibensberger, but the aircraft was disassembled and placed into indoor storage. On 22 January 2004, the XV-3 was delivered to Bell Plant 6 in Arlington, Texas. In 2005, Bell Helicopter employees began work to restore 54-148 to museum display condition, this time led by former XV-3 engineer Charles Davis. Following a two-year restoration, the XV-3 was transferred to the National Museum of the United States Air Force in Dayton, Ohio. It was placed on display in the museum's Post-Cold War Gallery in June 2007, and as of 2011 is on display in the Research & Development Gallery.

== Specifications (XV-3) ==
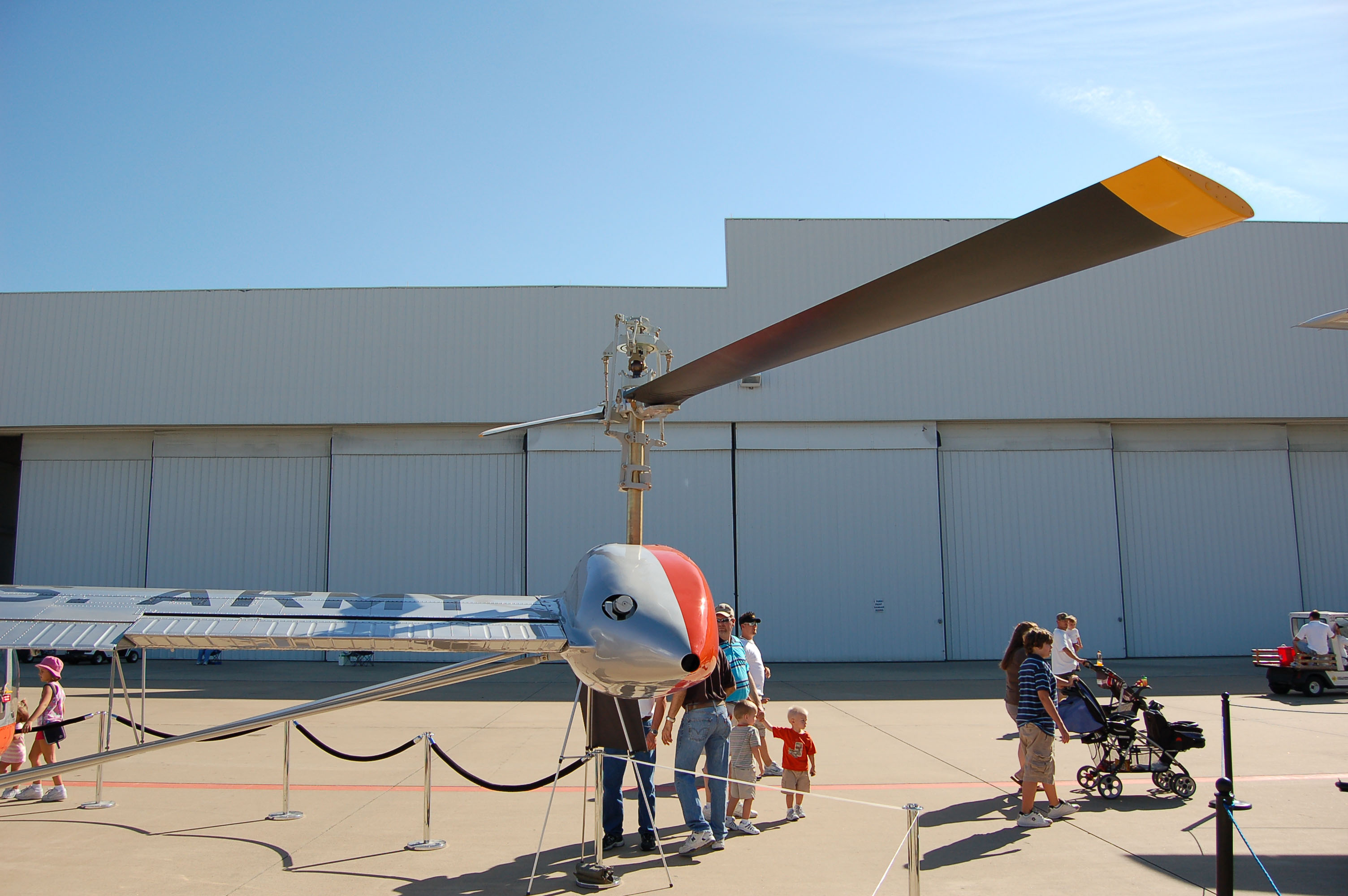
Starboard tiltrotor, Alliance Airshow, Fort Worth, Texas (2006)

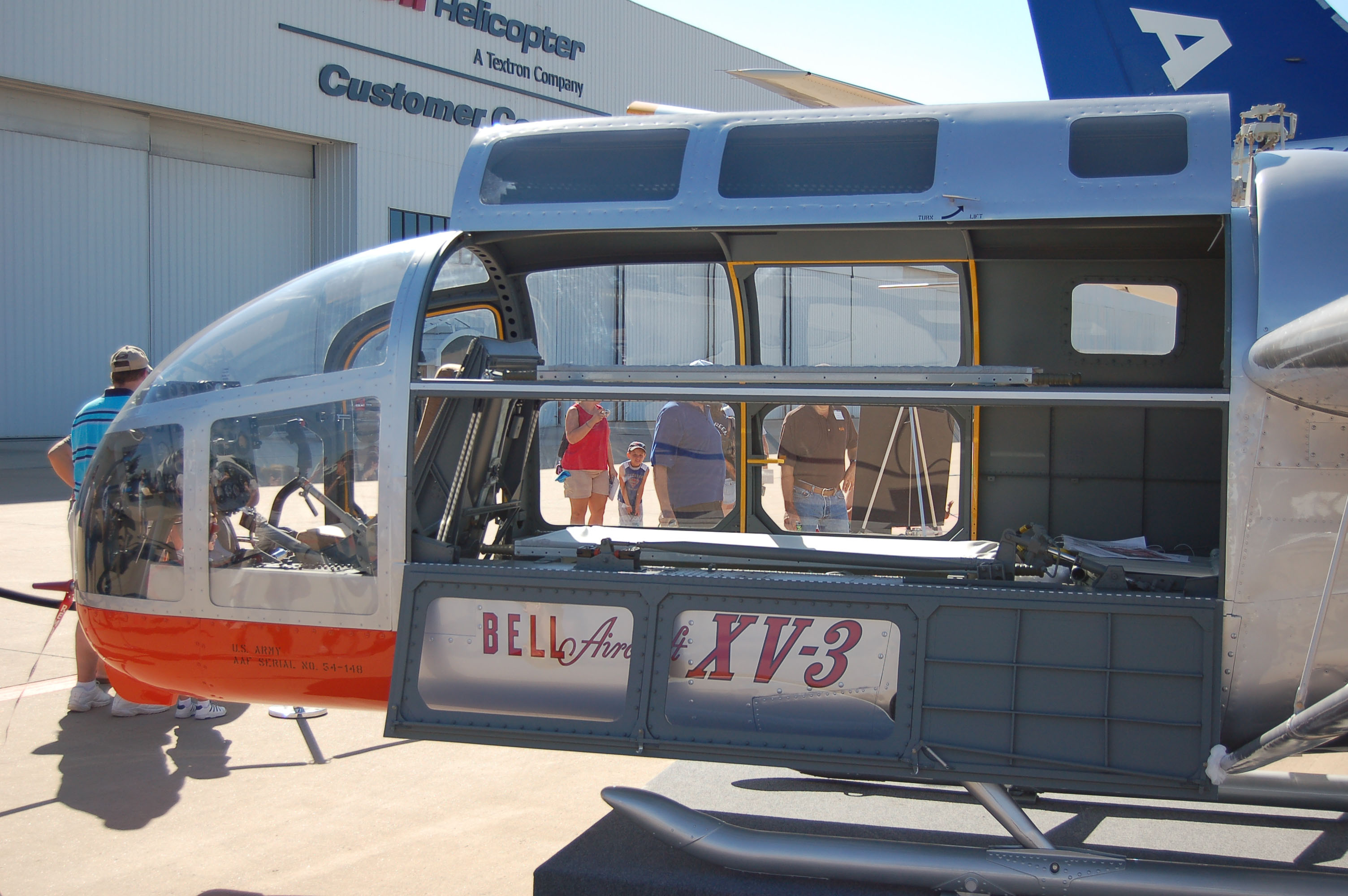
Restored XV-3 at an air show, showing the side-door open

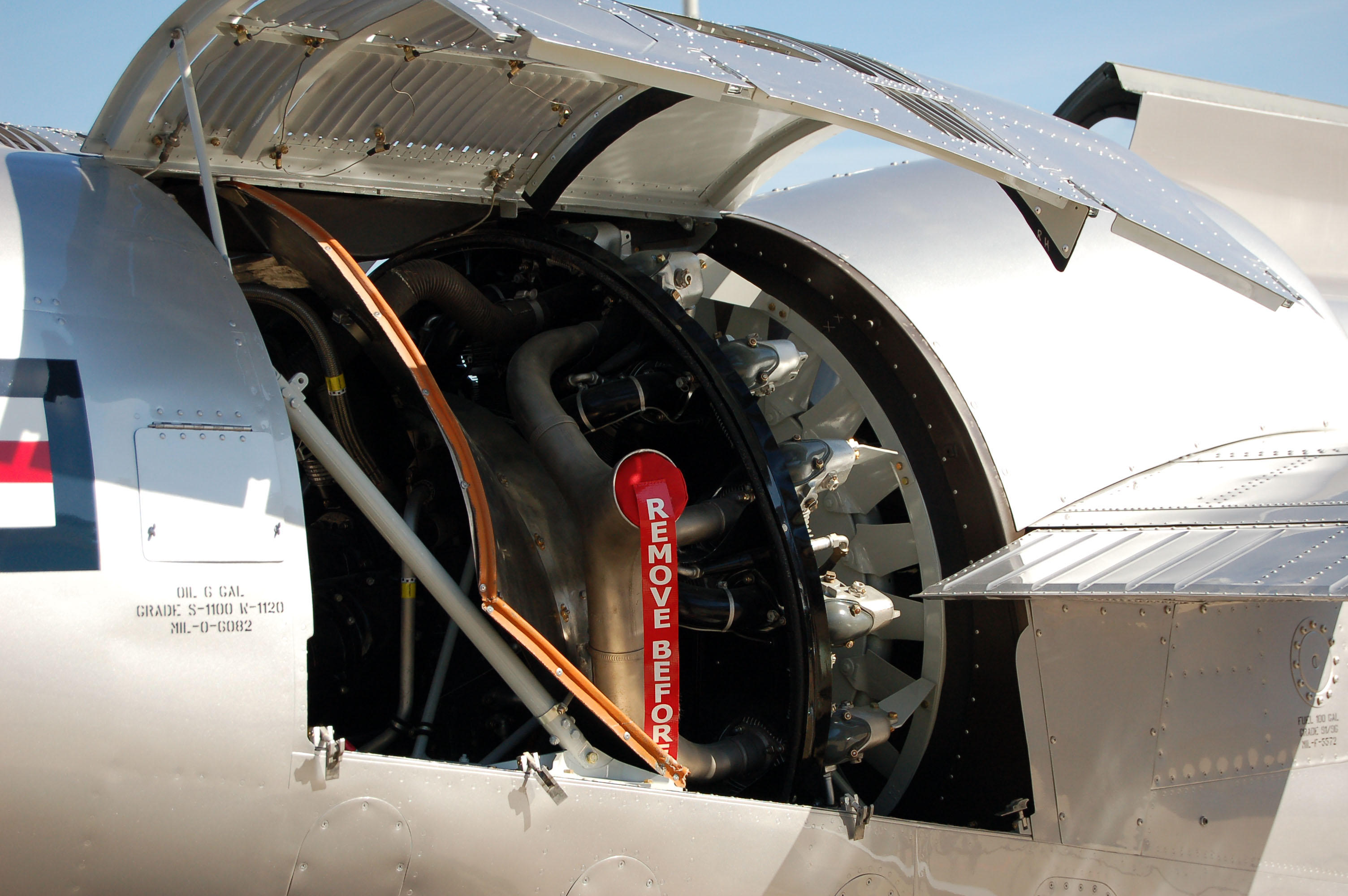
Hatch open showing the Wasp radial piston engine

Data from NASA Monograph 17 and Aerophile, Vol. 2, No. 1.

General characteristics

- Crew: 1
- Length: 30 ft 4 in (9.25 m)
- Wingspan: 31 ft 4 in (9.55 m)
- Height: 13 ft 3 in (4.04 m)
- Wing area: 116 sq ft (10.8 m^{2})
- Airfoil: NACA 23021
- Empty weight: 1,907 lb (865 kg)
- Gross weight: 2,218 lb (1,006 kg)
- Powerplant: 1 × Pratt & Whitney R-985-AN-1 Wasp Junior 9-cylinder air-cooled radial piston engine, 450 hp (340 kW)
- Main rotor diameter: 2 × 25 ft 0 in (7.62 m)
- Main rotor area: 981.9 sq ft (91.22 m^{2}) 3-bladed translating rotors
- Blade section: NACA 0015

Performance

- Maximum speed: 184 mph (296 km/h, 160 kn)
- Cruise speed: 167 mph (269 km/h, 145 kn)
- Range: 255 mi (410 km, 222 nmi)
- Service ceiling: 15,000 ft (4,600 m)
- Rate of climb: 1,260 ft/min (6.4 m/s)

== See also ==
Related development

- Bell XV-15 – American experimental tiltrotor aircraft
- AgustaWestland AW609 – Twin-engine tiltrotor VTOL aircraft
- Bell Boeing V-22 Osprey – Military transport tiltrotor

Related lists

- List of military aircraft of the United States
