= AAI Aerosonde =

Type of aircraft

Aerosonde
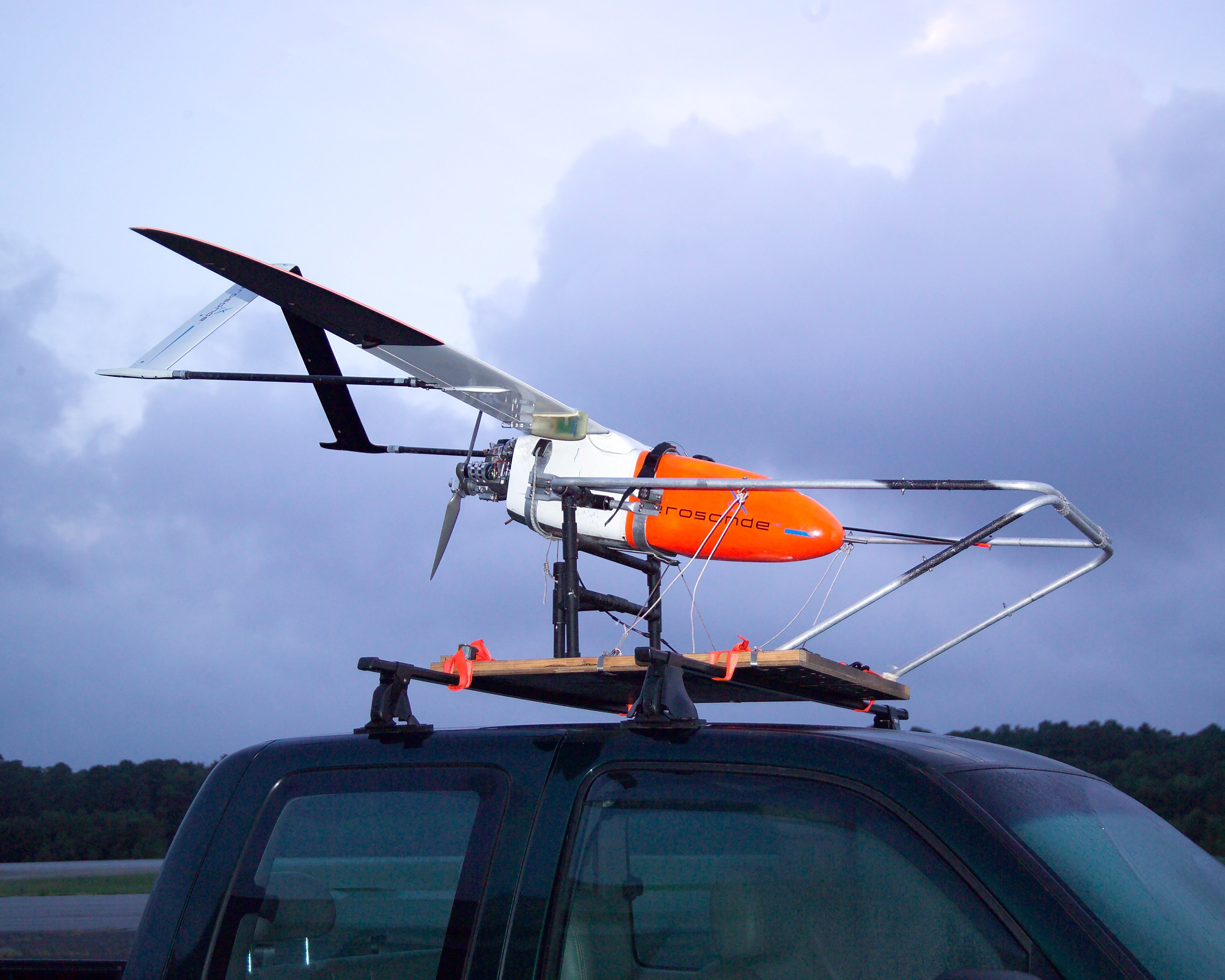
- Aerosonde on a truck-mounted launch platform

General information
- Type: Unmanned aerial vehicle
- National origin: United States
- Manufacturer: AAI Corporation

The AAI Aerosonde is a small unmanned aerial vehicle (UAV) designed to collect weather data, including temperature, atmospheric pressure, humidity, and wind measurements over oceans and remote areas. The Aerosonde was developed by Insitu, and is now manufactured by Aerosonde Ltd, which is a strategic business of AAI Corporation. The Aerosonde is powered by a modified Enya R120 model aircraft engine, and carries on board a small computer, meteorological instruments, and a GPS receiver for navigation. It is also used by the United States Armed Forces for intelligence, surveillance and reconnaissance (ISR).

== Operational history ==
On August 21, 1998, a Phase 1 Aerosonde nicknamed "Laima", after the ancient Latvian deity of good fortune, completed a 2,031 mile (3,270 km) flight across the Atlantic Ocean. This was the first crossing of the Atlantic Ocean by a UAV; at the time, it was also the smallest aircraft ever to cross the Atlantic (the smallest aircraft record was subsequently broken by the Spirit of Butts Farm UAV). Launched from a roof rack of a moving car due to its lack of undercarriage, Laima flew from Newfoundland, Canada to Benbecula, an island off the coast of Scotland in 26 hours 45 minutes in stormy weather, using approximately 1.5 U.S. gallons (1.25 imperial gallons or 5.7 litres) of gasoline (petrol). Other than for take-off and landing, the flight was autonomous, without external control, at an altitude of 5,500 ft (1,680 meters). Aerosondes have also been the first unmanned aircraft to penetrate tropical cyclones, with an initial mission in 2001 followed by eye penetrations in 2005.

On 5 March 2012, the U.S. Special Operations Command (SOCOM) awarded AAI a contract to provide the Aerosonde-G for their Mid-Endurance UAS II program. The catapult-launched air vehicle has a takeoff weight 34.1 or 36 kg (75 or 79 lb) depending on engine type, with endurance of over 10 hours and an electro-optic/infrared and laser-pointer payload. The Aerosonde has been employed by SOCOM and U.S. Naval Air Systems Command (NAVAIR) under the designation MQ-19 under service provision contracts. A typical system comprises four air vehicles and two ground control stations that are accommodated in tents or tailored to fit in most vehicles. The system can also include remote video terminals for individual users to uplink new navigation waypoints and sensor commands to, and receive sensor imagery and video from, the vehicle from a ruggedized tablet device. Originally, the Aerosonde suffered from engine-reliability issues, but Textron says it has rectified those issues.

By November 2015, Textron Systems was performing Aerosonde operations in "eight or nine" countries for its users, including the U.S. Marine Corps, U.S. Air Force, and SOCOM, as well as for commercial users consisting of a customer in the oil and gas industry. Instead of buying hardware, customers pay for "sensor hours," and the company decides how many aircraft are produced to meet requirements. 4,000 fee-for-service hours were being performed monthly, and the Aerosonde had exceeded 110,000 flight hours in service.

== Variants ==
Aerosonde Mk 1
Variant with a 2.9 m (9.5 ft) wingspan and powered by a 20cc gasoline engine. The Mk 1 is equipped with a GPS for navigation, uses VHF radio for communication, and has a maximum flight time of 30 hours.
Aerosonde Mk 3
Variant capable of Iridium satellite communication.
Aerosonde Mk 4.3
Variant used by the NASA Airborne Science Program with a maximum flight time of 30 hours and a gross weight of 34 lb (15 kg).
Aerosonde Mk 4.4
Variant used by the NASA Airborne Science Program with a maximum flight time of 30 hours and a gross weight of 34 lb (15 kg).
Aerosonde Mk 4.7
Variant with a 14.45 ft (4.4 m) wingspan. Offered in fixed-wing and VTOL configurations.
Aerosonde Mk 4.7G
Also known as the Aerosonde-G. Enhanced version of the Mk 4.7 for the United States Marine Corps' Small Tactical Unmanned Aircraft System competition. The Mk 4.7G has a strengthened 3.8 m (12 ft) wing, has a weight of 32 kg (71 lb), and is powered by a 4 hp (3.0 kW) engine, giving it a flight time of 16 hours. Designated MQ-19 under the 1962 Tri-Service designation system.
Aerosonde Mk 4.7J
Variant of the Mk 4.7 noted as being in development in June 2013. The Mk 4.7J was intended for the civilian and first responder markets and would be powered by a 3 hp (2.2 kW) Aerosonde engine to keep it under the 25 kg (55 lb) weight limit imposed by both the Australian Civil Aviation Safety Authority and American Federal Aviation Administration.
Aerosonde Mk 4.7 HQ
Also known as the Aerosonde HQ. VTOL variant of the Mk 4.7.
Aerosonde Mk 4.8
Improved Mk 4.7 with a more powerful engine and greater payload capacity. Offered in fixed-wing and VTOL configurations, with the latter having an increased wingspan of 17.03 ft (5.19 m).
Aerosonde Mk 4.8 HQ
VTOL variant for the United States Army's Future Tactical Uncrewed Aircraft Systems program. Two prototypes began developmental testing in April 2025, having been given the Tri-Service designation YRQ-10A.

== Aircraft on display ==
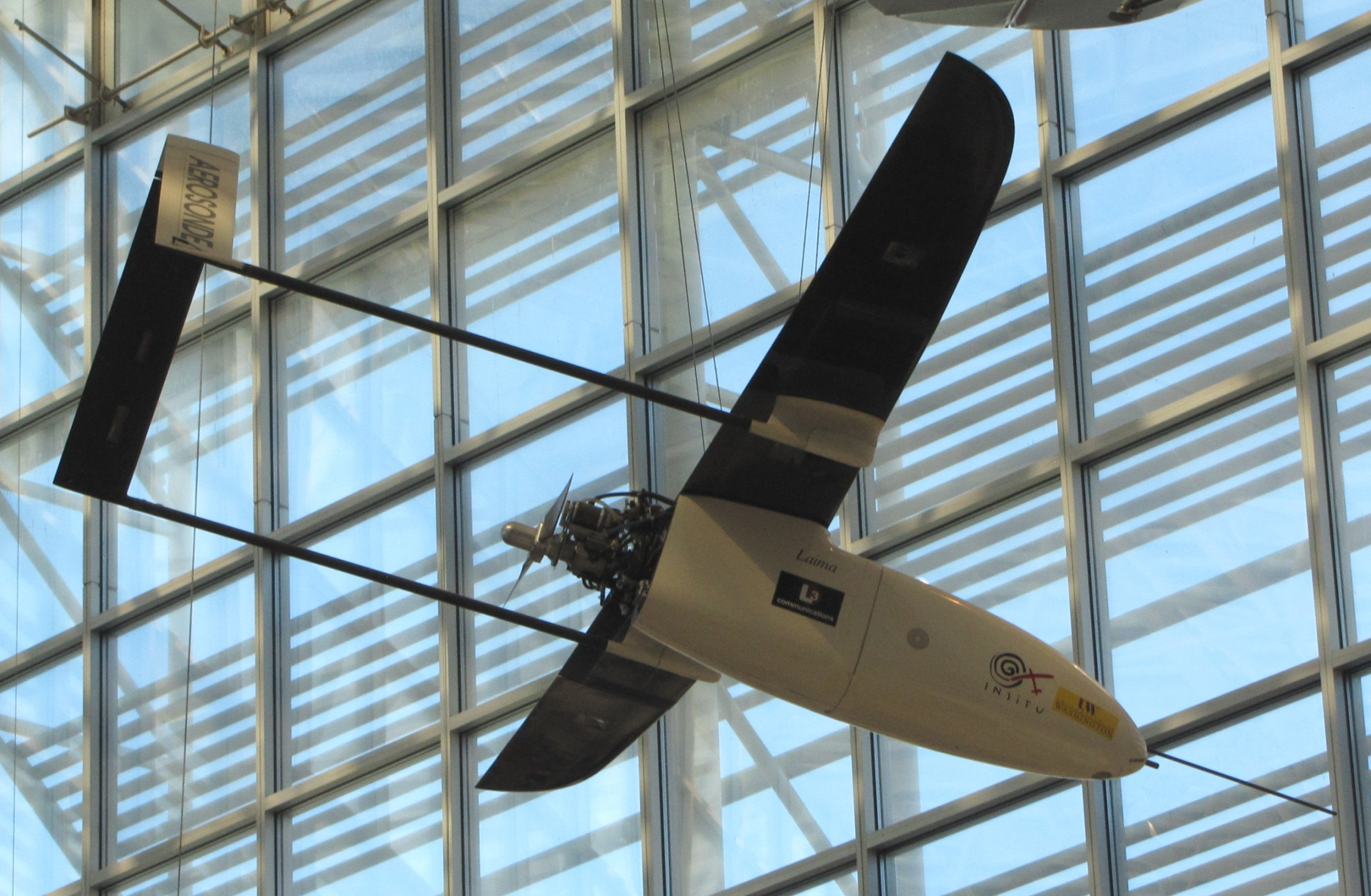
Laima in display at Museum of Flight, Seattle, WA

Laima, the Aerosonde Mk 1 that flew across the Atlantic Ocean, is on display at the Museum of Flight in Seattle.

== Specifications (Aerosonde Mk 1) ==
Data from

General characteristics

- Wingspan: 9 ft 6 in (2.9 m)
- Empty weight: 18 lb (8 kg)
- Gross weight: 29 lb (13 kg)

Performance

- Cruise speed: 45 mph (72 km/h, 39 kn)
- Range: 93 mi (150 km, 81 nmi) (navigation range)
- Endurance: 30 hours
- Service ceiling: 13,000 ft (4,000 m)

Avionics

- GNSS compatibility: GPS
