= Carter PAV =

Two-bladed compound autogyro

PAV
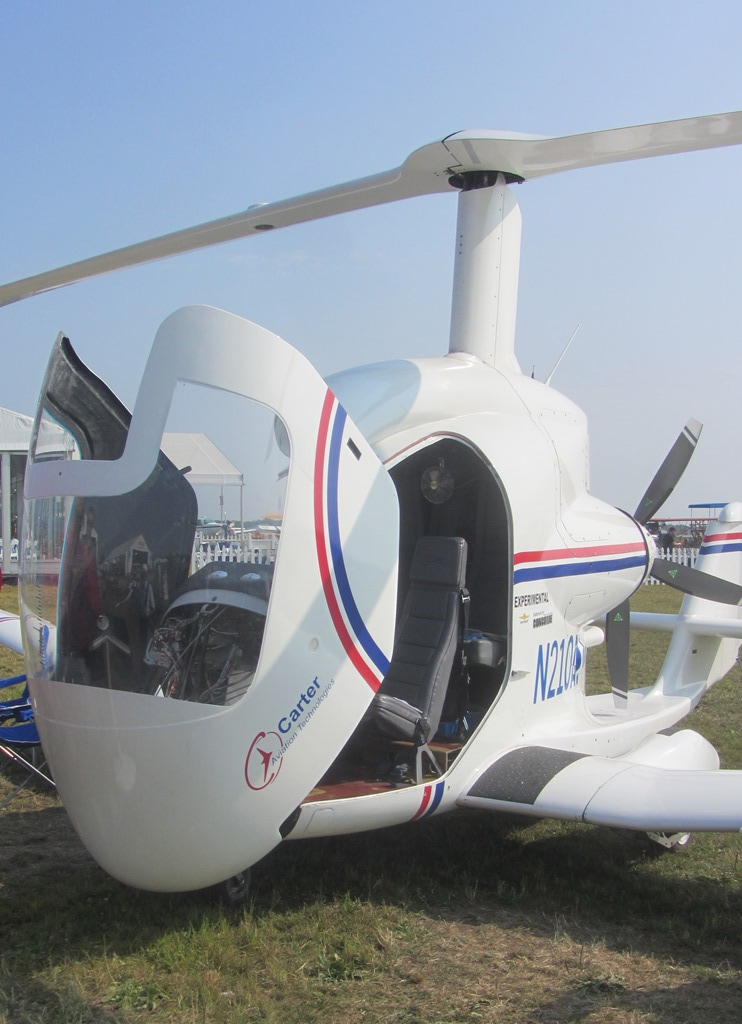
- On display 2014

General information
- Type: Compound autogyro
- Manufacturer: Carter Aviation Technologies
- Status: In test
- Number built: 2

History
- First flight: 5 January 2011
- Developed from: CarterCopter

The Carter PAV (Personal Air Vehicle) is a two-bladed, compound autogyro developed by Carter Aviation Technologies to demonstrate slowed rotor technology. The design has an unpowered rotor mounted on top of the fuselage, wings like a conventional fixed-wing aircraft mounted underneath, and a controllable pitch pusher propeller at the rear of the fuselage. Heavy weights (75 pounds or 34 kilograms each) are placed in the rotor tips to enhance rotational energy and to reduce flapping.

== Development ==
When the CarterCopter was damaged in 2005 due to a gear-up landing caused by pilot error, the cost of repair was deemed higher than the cost of making a new aircraft with the added benefit of incorporating lessons learned from the first aircraft. Design of the PAV was begun during 2005. Several changes and development problems occurred along the way; twin boom was deemed unnecessary, so a single boom was constructed, and flaws in rotor blades and hub were revealed during testing and then corrected.

On 16 November 2009, the AAI Corporation (a division of Textron) signed a 40-year exclusive license agreement with the company concerning all unmanned aircraft systems, one of which was intended to deliver 3,000 pounds (1,400 kg) of cargo similar to the unmanned Kaman K-MAX, but over a future range of 1,300 nautical miles (2,400 km) compared to the demonstrated 150 nautical miles (280 km) or more of the K-MAX. The agreement committed CarterCopters to developing the technology to maturity, in exchange for exclusive rights to develop UAVs for the next 40 years. The first product in the AAI agreement was to be an autonomous slowed rotor/compound (SR/C) aircraft based on the Carter Personal Air Vehicle.

"Critical Design Review" (CDR) for AAI Corporation was performed around January 2010 when the prototype was already being built. Usually a CDR is performed before a vehicle is built.

In 2014, Carter said they bought back the license from AAI and is seeking production partners outside USA, hoping for production 3–5 years later.

== Testing ==
The PAV was taxi tested in autumn of 2010 at Olney Airport after FAA Special Airworthiness Certificate on 27 July 2010, and performed traffic pattern movement on 2 December 2010, piloted by Larry Neal at the controls and co-pilot Robert Luna. Larry Neal was also one of the pilots of the CarterCopter at Olney in 2005.

The first flight occurred on 5 January 2011 at Olney without wings and lasted 36 minutes, which qualified Carter for a milestone payment.

Carter stated that the PAV performed its first zero-roll jump take-off on 18 January 2011, to a height of 120 feet (37 m). Eight jump take-offs were performed. There are some electrical issues with the aircraft, and it is not in volume production.

The PAV flew traffic patterns with wings at Olney in January 2012, and has since flown winged test flights. It flew a few hours at a time, but its flight certificate restricted it to within 5 miles (8.0 km) of Olney.

As of June 2012, development of the PAV is a year behind schedule due to various technical problems, and a delay of a further year was caused by rotor RPM software control issues. Carter received funding from the Wichita Falls Economic Development Corporation in 2010 to complete the PAV. Carter views the lack of a PAV flight simulator as a mistake, and attempts to build one. The previous CarterCopter was designed using a flight simulator.

Carter says that the PAV has a lift to drag ratio of 10–15, and reached an advance ratio of 0.85 in 2012.

According to Carter, the PAV reached Mu-1 on 7 November 2013. It also achieved a speed of 174 kn (322 km/h; 200 mph), and the rotor was slowed down to 113 rpm. The PAV flew its first public show flight outside Olney when it flew to Wichita Falls later that month. Carter says the PAV has achieved a speed of 204 miles per hour (328 km/h) at an altitude of 16,000 feet (4,900 m), a Mu of 1.13 and an L/D of 11.6-15. Carter has applied to the FAA to change the PAVs certificate from research and development to demonstration.

The second PAV (called PAV-II, registration N210AV) was flight approved in March 2014, and demonstrated at Sun 'n Fun air festival and MacDill Air Force Base in 2014, both in Florida. In July 2014, it was displayed at Oshkosh Airshow. Carter says it has flown 186 kn (344 km/h; 214 mph) at 18,000 feet (5,500 m). The first non-Carter pilots flew the aircraft in 2015.

== Design ==
Computer aided design and X-plane flight simulation were used during development. Unlike the twin-boom CarterCopter, the PAV has a single tailboom. A tilting mast allows the rotor to be tilted 15 degrees forward and 30 degrees aft to allow different centres of gravity and wing angle-of-attacks.

Helicopter rotors are designed to operate at a fixed RPM (within a narrow range of a few percent), whereas Carter uses RPM ranges between 100 and 350. Most aircraft have two energy parameters (speed and altitude) which the pilot can trade between, but Carter technology attempts to use rotor rotation as a third energy parameter.

The purpose of the Slowed Rotor/Compound aircraft is to enhance the flight envelope compared to fixed-wing aircraft, helicopters and traditional autogyros, by minimizing the dangerous areas of the stall speed diagram/height–velocity diagram as well as moving the speed limit up.

The PAV has traditional airplane-like controls (Vernier type), but the stick also controls the rotor. Most controls were automated in 2011, and jump-takeoff is performed at the push of a button. Materials used include glass fiber, aluminum, titanium, and steel, as well as autoclaved carbon/epoxy prepreg with aramid honeycomb core on the PAV-II. The tip weights had been made of tungsten, while the current (2013) are made of steel.

Suppliers for the aircraft include Blue Mountain Avionics for avionics and air-to-ground video and telemetry, and Sky Ox Oxygen Systems as the PAV is not pressurized. 60 channels of information convey sensor measurements from the aircraft to a ground computer, and 4 video cameras tape the flights. The engine is equipped with a performance enhancement system by Nitrous Express.

== Operation ==
The PAV has flight characteristics similar to other Carter aircraft. When stationary on the ground, the engine powers up the flat pitch rotor to 370 RPM, and the engine is then disengaged from the rotor to provide full power to the propeller.

External media

Images
- PAV in flight 1 2

Video
- PAV jump take-off, with wings

The rotor now has substantial rotational energy due to the tip weights (usable temporary eng1 equivalent to 1,000 horsepower or 750 kilowatts), and the rotor blades are pitched to push air down and lift the aircraft in a jump takeoff. While altitude is reached, the aircraft transitions into forward flight using the pusher propeller, and the rotor shifts to autorotation (windmilling) with air flowing up through the rotor. As speed increases, the air flow increases rotor RPM like other autogyros. Once sufficient airspeed is reached (around 70–85 miles per hour or 113–137 kilometres per hour) for the small wings to provide lift, rotor blades are feathered to reduce rotor speed to 100 RPM and minimize drag, and lift is provided mostly by the wings when speed reaches 150 miles per hour (240 km/h). Rotor lift is reduced to 10%, and flight efficiency is somewhat below that of a commercial jet plane.

== Specifications (PAV) ==
Data from Jane's All the World's Aircraft

General characteristics

- Crew: 2
- Capacity: 2 passengers
- Wingspan: 45 ft 0 in (13.7 m)
- Empty weight: 2,000 lb (907 kg)
- Gross weight: 3,800 lb (1,724 kg)
- Powerplant: 1 × Lycoming IO-540 K1G5 6 cylinder piston engine, 250-350 hp (224 kW) at 2660 rpm at sea level
- Propellers: 4 blade N110AV or 5 blade N210AV
- Propellers: 8 ft 0 in (2.44 m) diameter

Performance

- Cruise speed: 180 mph (290 km/h, 160 kn)
- Stall speed: 0 mph (0 km/h, 0 kn) (briefly)
- L/D of 15

== See also ==
Related development

- CarterCopter
