= Kenneth Wernicke =

American aerospace engineer (1932–2022)

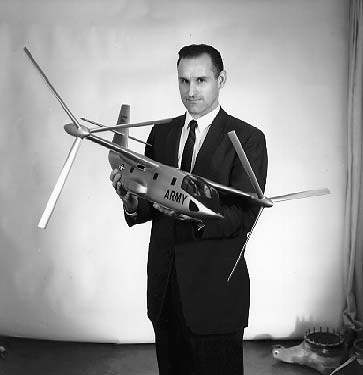
- Born: October 12, 1932; Missouri, U.S.
- Died: September 1, 2022 (aged 89); Bedford, Texas, U.S.
- Occupation: Aerospace Engineer
- Children: Keith Wernicke Fonda Fox Natalie Aldridge

Kenneth Gene Wernicke (October 12, 1932 – September 1, 2022) was an American aerospace engineer. He had a leading role in the development of the tilt rotor aircraft Bell XV-3, Bell XV-15 and V-22 Osprey.

== Life and career ==
Ken Wernicke had a BS and MS in Aerospace Engineering from the University of Kansas.

From 1955 to 1990 he was an engineer at Bell Helicopter, and worked as a leading engineer with Bob Lichten from 1964 on the tilt rotor technology.

Along with his twin brother Rod, (who was also a Bell engineer) his son Keith and Rod's sons Tim and Kent, he was developing a rubber tracked amphibious vehicle after the US Navy requested concepts for a scout vehicle that could travel on water at high speed and proceed with all terrain capability for reconnaissance on land. He held several patents related to flying and tracks.

Wernicke was an advisory board member of rotorcraft company Carter Aviation Technologies.

Wernicke died in Bedford, Texas, on September 1, 2022, at the age of 89.

== Awards ==
Wernicke has received the Paul E. Haueter Memorial Award (American Helicopter Society) in 1978, and the Aircraft Design Award (AIAA) in 1983.
