= Slowed rotor =

Helicopter design variant

External image
- Some previous attempts at high-speed VTOL only works in Microsoft Internet Explorer

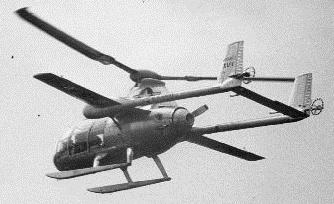
The McDonnell XV-1 could slow its rotor from 410 to 180 RPM

The slowed rotor principle is used in the design of some helicopters. On a conventional helicopter the rotational speed of the rotor is constant; reducing it at lower flight speeds can reduce fuel consumption and enable the aircraft to fly more economically. In the compound helicopter and related aircraft configurations such as the gyrodyne and winged autogyro, reducing the rotational speed of the rotor and offloading part of its lift to a fixed wing reduces drag, enabling the aircraft to fly faster.

== Introduction ==
Traditional helicopters get both their propulsion and lift from the main rotor; by using a dedicated propulsion device such as a propeller or jet engine, the rotor burden is lessened. If wings are also used to lift the aircraft, the rotor can be unloaded (partially or fully) and its rotational speed further reduced, enabling higher aircraft speed. Compound helicopters use these methods, but the Boeing A160 Hummingbird shows that rotor-slowing is possible without wings or propellers, and regular helicopters may reduce turbine RPM (and thus rotor speed) to 85% using 19% less power. Alternatively, research suggests that twin-engine helicopters may decrease fuel consumption by 25%-40% when running only one engine, given adequate height and velocity well inside the safe areas of the height–velocity diagram.

As of 2012, no compound or hybrid wing/rotor (manned) aircraft had been produced in quantity, and only a few had been flown as experimental aircraft, mainly because the increased complexities have not been justified by military or civilian markets. Varying the rotor speed may induce severe vibrations at specific resonance frequencies.

Contra-rotating rotors (as on the Sikorsky X2) solve the problem of lift dissymmetry by having both left and right sides provide near equal lift with less flapping. The X2 deals with the compressibility issue by reducing its rotor speed from 446 to 360 RPM to keep the advancing blade tip below the sound barrier when going above 200 knots.

== Design principles ==
=== Speed limits of aircraft rotors ===
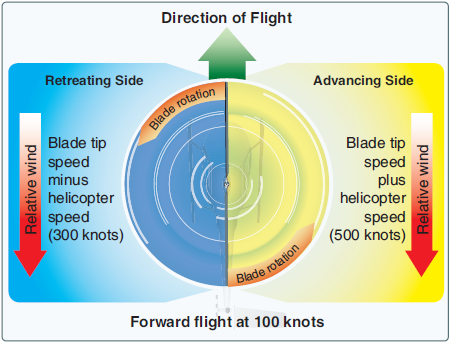
Effect of blade airspeed on lift on advancing and retreating side, when aircraft speed is 100 knots.

The rotors of conventional helicopters are designed to operate at a fixed speed of rotation, to within a few percent. This introduces limitations in areas of the flight envelope where the optimal speed differs.

In particular, it limits the maximum forward speed of the aircraft. Two main issues restrict the speed of rotorcraft:

- Retreating blade stall. As forward speed of the helicopter increases, the airflow over the retreating blade becomes relatively slower, while the airflow over the advancing blade is relatively faster, creating more lift. If not counteracted by flapping, this would cause dissymmetry of lift and eventually retreating blade stall, and blade stability suffers as the blade reaches its limits for flapping.
- Transonic drag near the rotor blade tip. The faster-moving advancing blade tip may begin to approach the speed of sound, where transonic drag begins to rise steeply, and severe buffeting and vibration effects can occur. This effect prevents any further increase in speed, even if the helicopter has surplus power remaining, and even if it features a highly streamlined fuselage. A similar effect prevents propeller-driven aircraft from achieving supersonic speeds, although they can achieve higher speeds than a helicopter since the propeller blade isn't advancing in the direction of travel.

These (and other) problems limit the practical speed of a conventional helicopter to around 160–200 knots (300–370 km/h). At the extreme, the theoretical top speed for a rotary winged aircraft is about 225 knots (259 mph; 417 km/h), just above the current official speed record for a conventional helicopter held by a Westland Lynx, which flew at 400 km/h (250 mph) in 1986 where its blade tips were nearly Mach 1.

=== Slowed rotors and aircraft speed ===
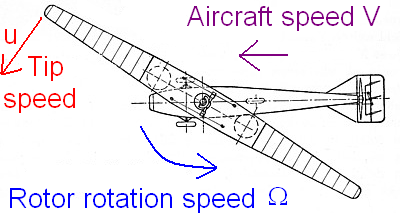
Rotorcraft Aspect ratio (mu) diagram

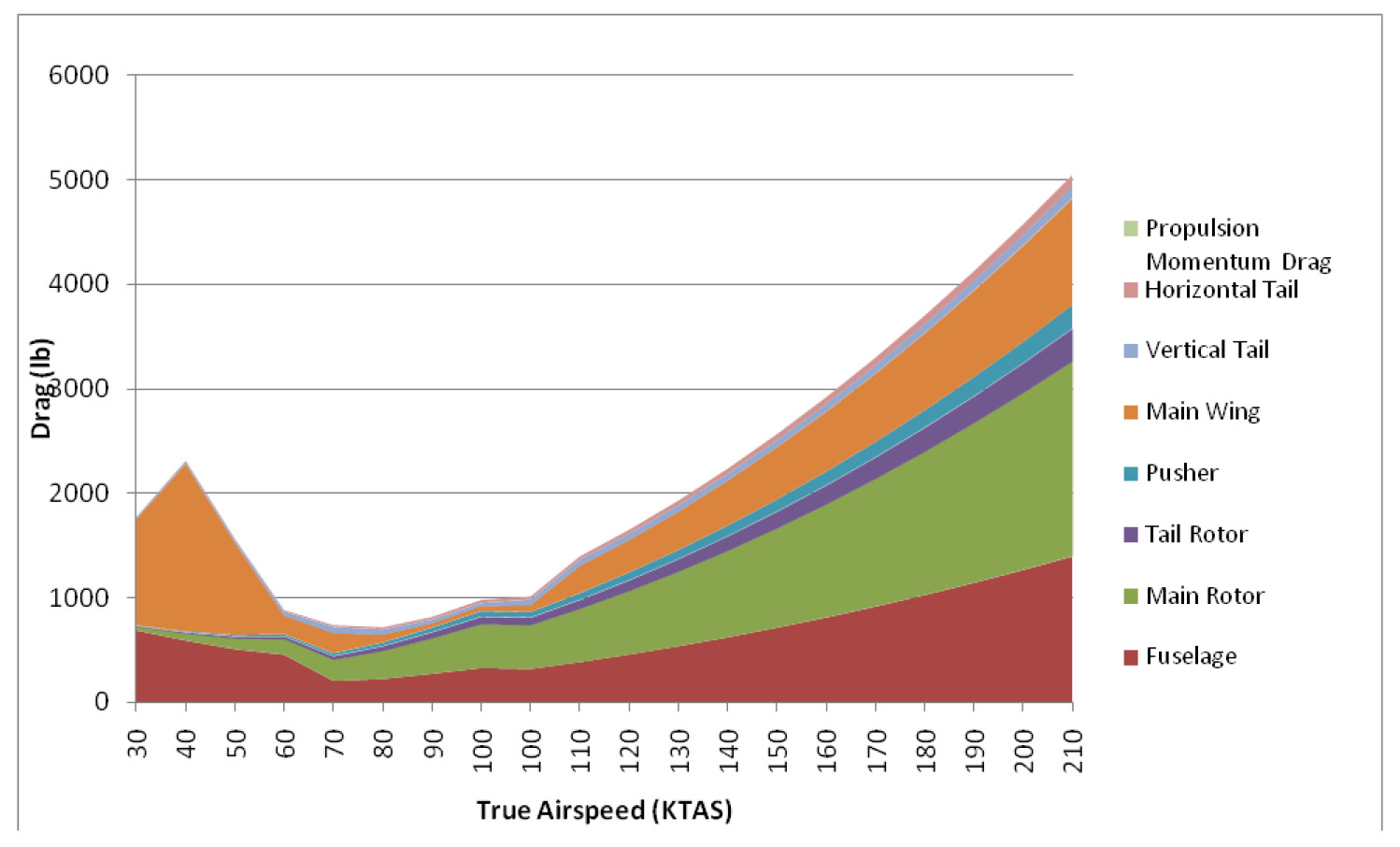
Drag type curves as a function of airspeed (simulated)

Cruise combinations for rotor power, propeller and wings.

For rotorcraft, advance ratio (or Mu, symbol $\mu$) is defined as the aircraft forward speed V divided by its relative blade tip speed. Upper mu limit is a critical design factor for rotorcraft, and the optimum for traditional helicopters is around 0.4.

The "relative blade tip speed" u is the tip speed relative to the aircraft (not the airspeed of the tip). Thus the formula for Advance ratio is

$\mu = \frac {V}{u} = \frac {V}{\Omega\cdot R}$ where Omega (Ω) is the rotor's angular velocity, and R is the rotor radius (about the length of one rotor blade)

When the rotor blade is perpendicular to the aircraft and advancing, its tip airspeed V_{t} is the aircraft speed plus relative blade tip speed, or V_{t}=V+u. At mu=1, V is equal to u and the tip airspeed is twice the aircraft speed.

At the same position on the opposite side (retreating blade), the tip airspeed is the aircraft speed minus relative blade tip speed, or V_{t}=V-u. At mu=1, the tip airspeed is zero. At a mu between 0.7 and 1.0, most of the retreating side has reverse airflow.

Although rotor characteristics are fundamental to rotorcraft performance, little public analytical and experimental knowledge exists between advance ratios of 0.45 to 1.0, and none is known above 1.0 for full-size rotors. Computer simulations are not capable of adequate predictions at high mu. The region of reverse flow on the retreating blade is not well understood, however some research has been conducted, particularly for scaled rotors. The US Army Aviation Applied Technology Directorate runs a supporting program in 2016 aiming at developing transmissions with a 50% rotor speed reduction.

The profile drag of a rotor corresponds to the cube of its rotational speed. Reducing the rotational speed is therefore a significant reduction of rotor drag, allowing higher aircraft speed A conventional rotor such as the UH-60A has lowest consumption around 75% rpm, but higher aircraft speed (and weight) requires higher rpm.

A rotor disk with variable radius is a different way of reducing tip speed to avoid compressibility, but blade loading theory suggests that a fixed radius with varying rpm performs better than a fixed rpm with varying radius.

=== Fuel economy of slowed rotors ===
Conventional helicopters have constant-speed rotors and adjust lift by varying the blade angle of attack or collective pitch. The rotors are optimised for high-lift or high-speed flight modes and in less demanding situations are not as efficient.

The profile drag of a rotor corresponds to the cube of its rotational speed. Reducing the rotational speed and increasing the angle of attack can therefore give a significant reduction in rotor drag, allowing lower fuel consumption.

== History ==
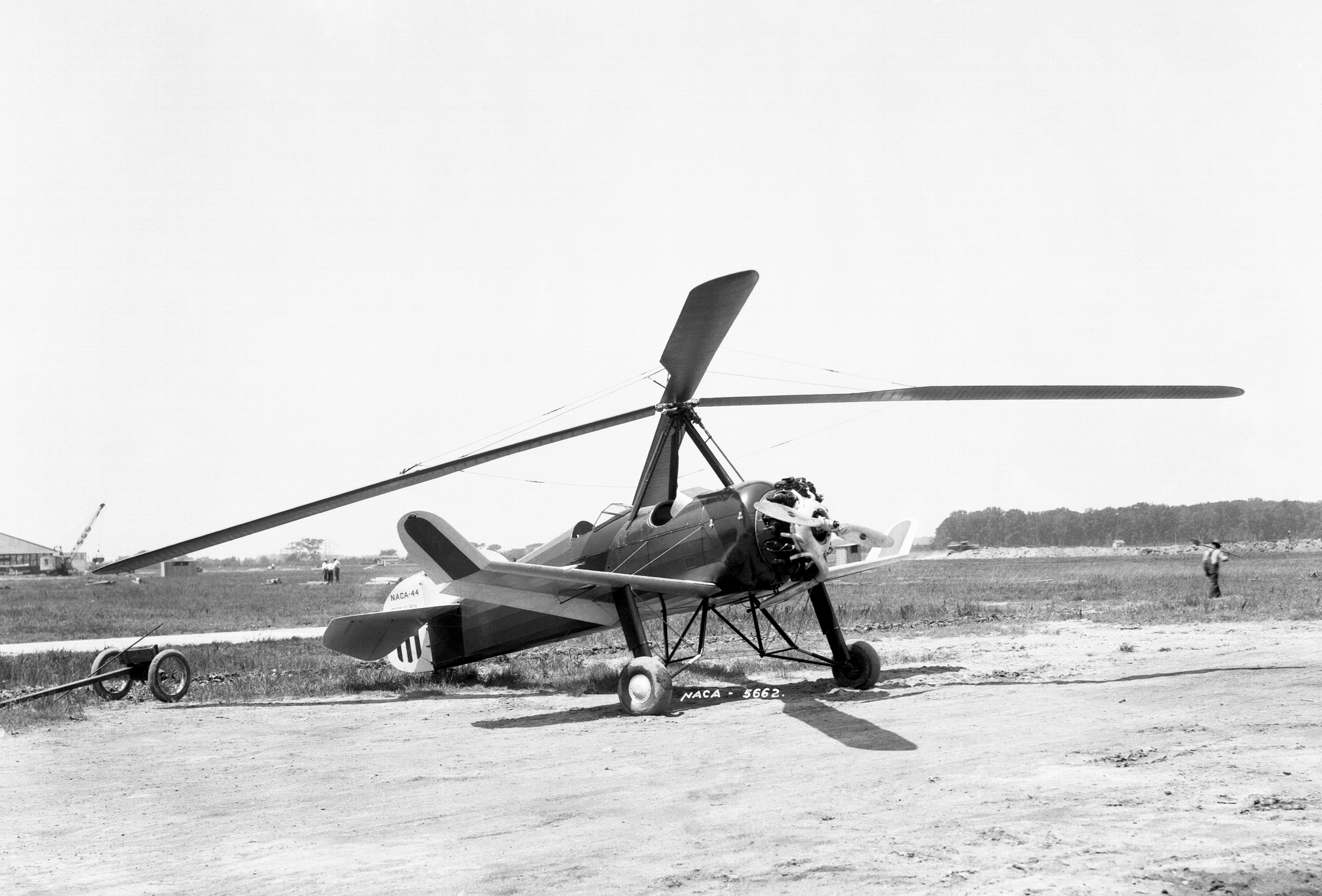
Pitcairn PCA-2 autogyro. Unpowered rotor, tractor propeller, wings.

Technical parameters given for each type listed:

- maximum speed.
- μ, the ratio of forward airspeed to rotational tip speed.
- Rotor lift as a percentage of total lift, at full speed.
- Lift-to-drag ratio (L/D).

=== Early development ===
When Juan de la Cierva developed the autogyro through the 1920s and 1930s, it was found that the tip speeds of the advancing rotor blade could become excessive. Designers such as he and Harold F. Pitcairn developed the idea of adding a conventional wing to offload the rotor during high-speed flight, allowing it to rotate at slower speeds.

The 1932 Pitcairn PCA-2 autogyro had a maximum speed of 20-102 knots (117 mph; 189 km/h), μ of 0.7, and L/D of 4.8

NACA engineer John Wheatley examined the effect of varying advance ratios up to about 0.7 in a wind tunnel in 1933 and published a landmark study in 1934. Although lift could be predicted with some accuracy, by 1939 the state of the art theory still gave unrealistically low values for rotor drag.

=== Postwar projects ===
Fairey Aviation in the UK worked on gyrodynes in the late 1940s and 1950s developing tip-jet propulsion which eliminated the need for countertorque. They culminated in the Fairey Rotodyne, the prototype for a VTOL passenger aircraft, which could combine the vertical landing of a helicopter with the speed of a fixed wing aircraft. The Rotodyne had a single 90 ft diameter main rotor supplemented by a 46 ft wide wing with forward thrust provided by twin turboprop engines. In forward flight the power to the rotor was reduced to about 10%. Its maximum speed was 166 knots (191 mph; 307 km/h) a record set in 1959. 0.6. Rotor speed was 120 (high speed cruising flight as an autogyro) to 140 (flare out while landing as a helicopter) rpm During forward flight 60% of the lift came from the wings and 40% from the rotor.

At the same time, the US Air Force was investigating fast VTOL aircraft. McDonnell developed what became the McDonnell XV-1, the first of the V-designated types, which flew in 1955. It was a tip-jet driven gyrodyne, which turned off rotor thrust at high airspeeds and relied on a pusher propeller to maintain forward flight and rotor autorotation. Lift was shared between the rotor and stub wings. It established a rotorcraft speed record of 170 knots (200 mph; 310 km/h). 0.95. 180-410 (50%). 85% \ 15%. 6.5 (Wind tunnel tests at 180 RPM with no propeller.)

The Lockheed AH-56 Cheyenne military attack helicopter for the US Army arose out of Lockheed's ongoing research programme into rigid rotors, which began with the CL-475 in 1959. Stub wings and a thrust turbojet to offload the rotor were first added to an XH-51A and in 1965 this allowed the craft to achieve a world speed record of 272 miles per hour (438 km/h). The Cheyenne flew just two years later, obtaining its forward thrust from a pusher propeller. Although pre-production prototypes were ordered the program met problems and was cancelled. 212 knots (244 mph; 393 km/h). 0.8. .. \ 20%.

The Piasecki 16H Pathfinder project similarly evolved an initially conventional design into a compound helicopter through the 1960s, culminating in the 16H-1A Pathfinder II which flew successfully in 1965. Thrust was obtained via a ducted fan at the tail.

The Bell 533 of 1969 was a compound jet helicopter. 275 knots (316 mph; 509 km/h).

Some postwar types

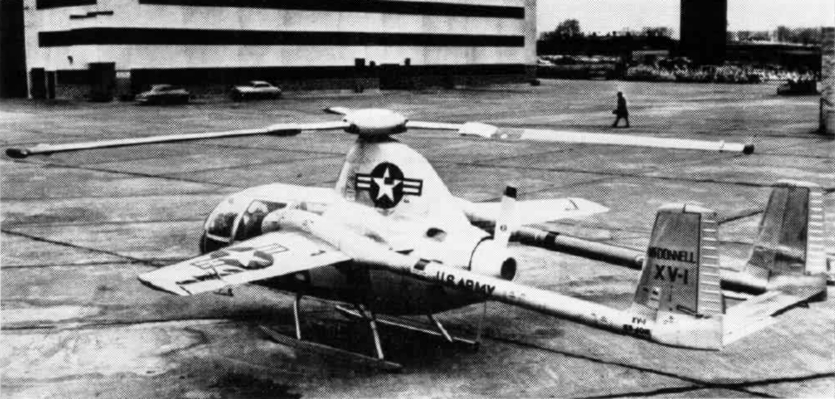
McDonnell XV-1. Optionally powered rotor, pusher propeller, wings.

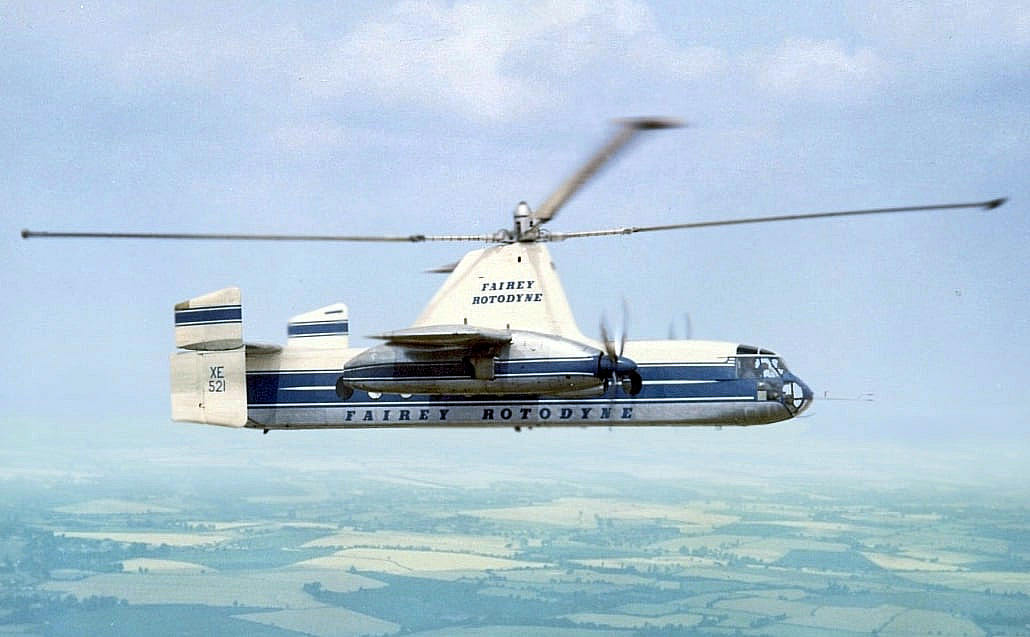
Fairey Rotodyne. Optionally powered rotor, tractor propellers, wings.

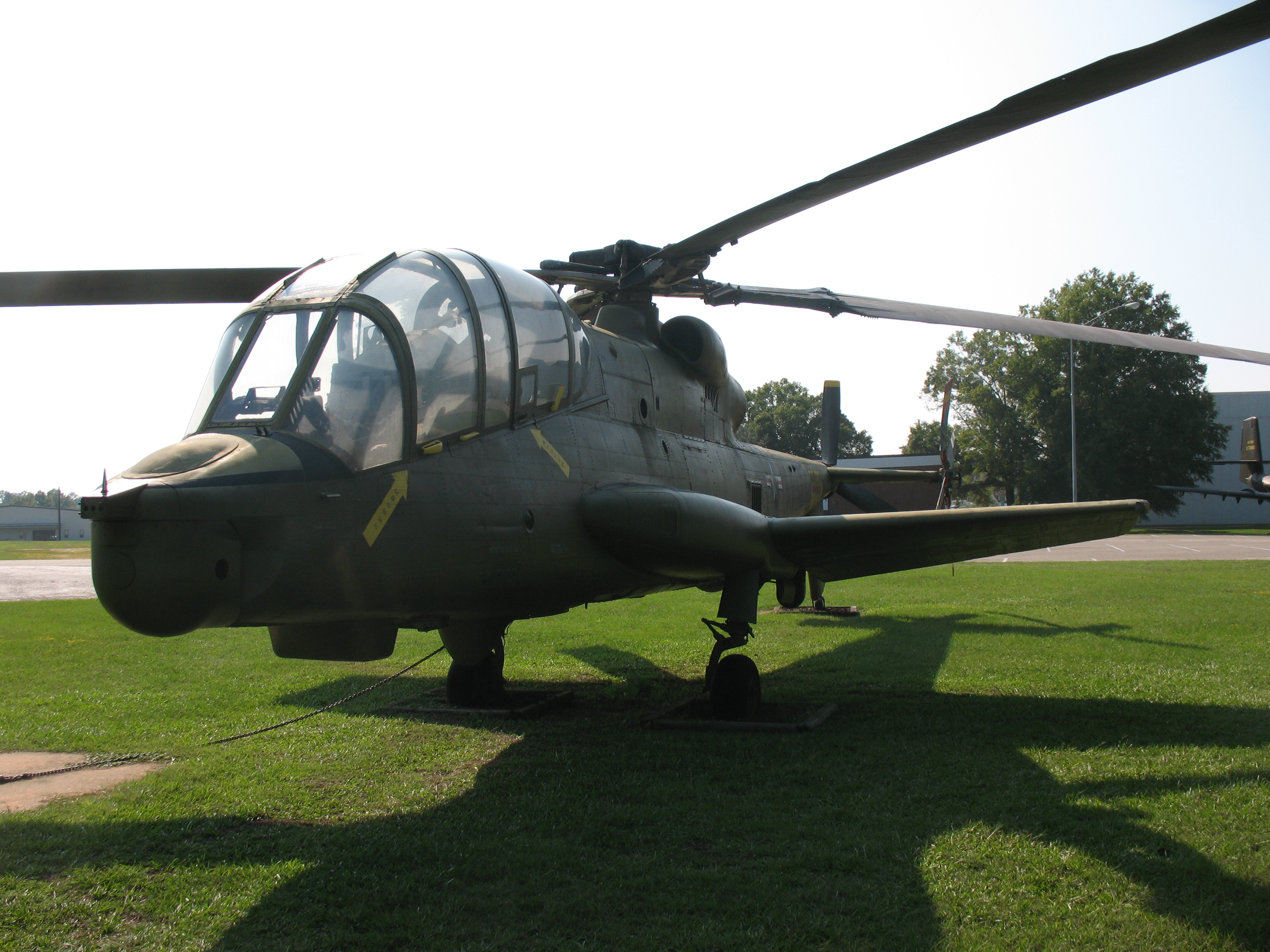
Lockheed AH-56 Cheyenne. Powered rotor, pusher propeller, wings.

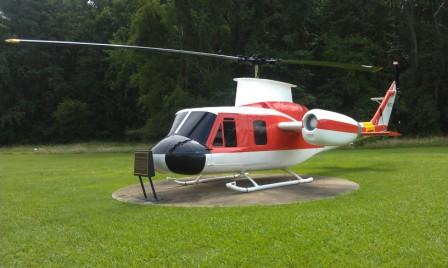
Bell 533. Powered rotor, jets, wings.

=== Modern developments ===
The compound helicopter has continued to be studied and flown experimentally. In 2010 the Sikorsky X2 flew with coaxial rotors. 250 knots (290 mph; 460 km/h). 0.8. 360 to 446. No wings. In 2013 the Eurocopter X3 flew. 255 knots (293 mph; 472 km/h). 310 minus 15%. 40-80% \.

The compound autogyro, in which the rotor is supplemented by wings and thrust engine but is not itself powered, has also undergone further refinement by Jay Carter Jr. He flew his CarterCopter in 2005. 150 knots (170 mph; 280 km/h). 1. 50%. By 2013 he had developed its design into a personal air vehicle, the Carter PAV. 175 knots (201 mph; 324 km/h). 1.13. 105 to 350.

The potential of the slowed rotor in enhancing fuel economy has also been studied in the Boeing A160 Hummingbird UAV, a conventional helicopter. 140 knots (160 mph; 260 km/h). 140 to 350.

Recent slowed rotor aircraft

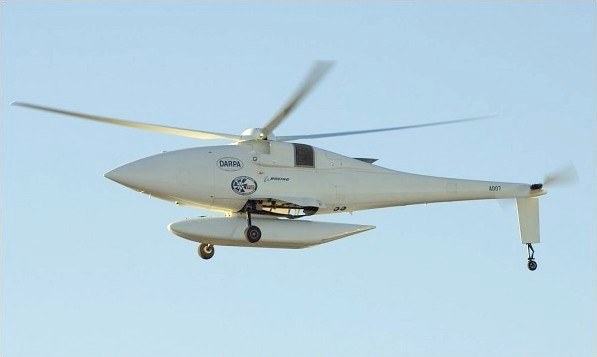
Boeing A160 Hummingbird
No wings, no propeller.

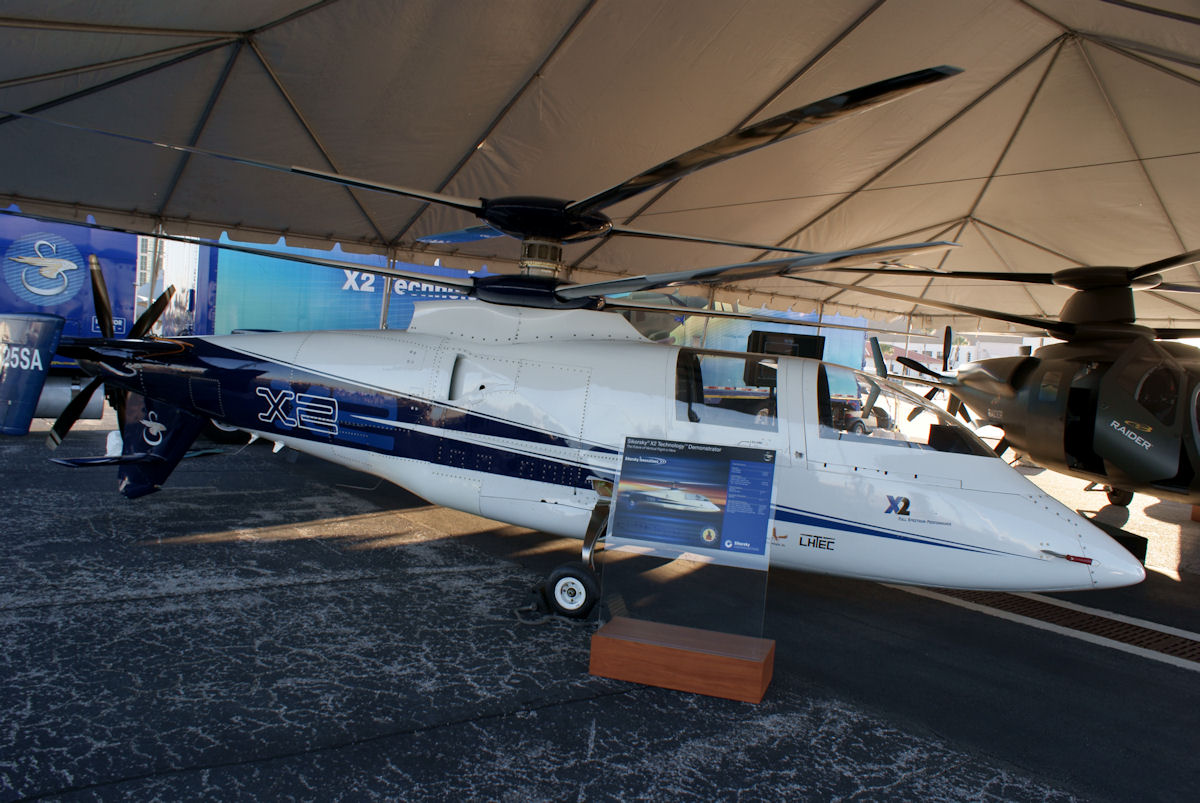
Sikorsky X2
Powered rotor, pusher propeller, no wings.

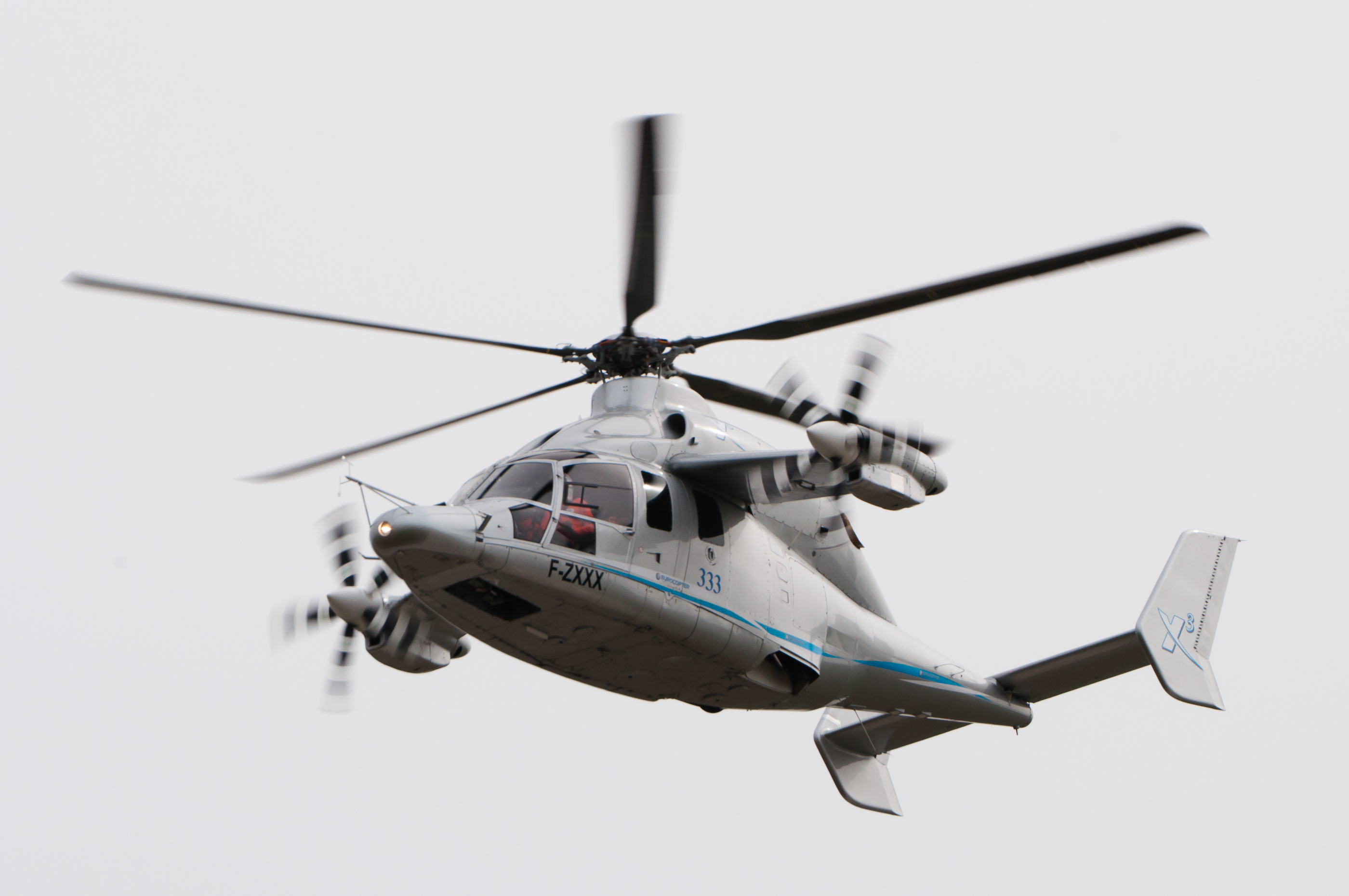
Eurocopter X3
Powered rotor, tractor propellers, wings.

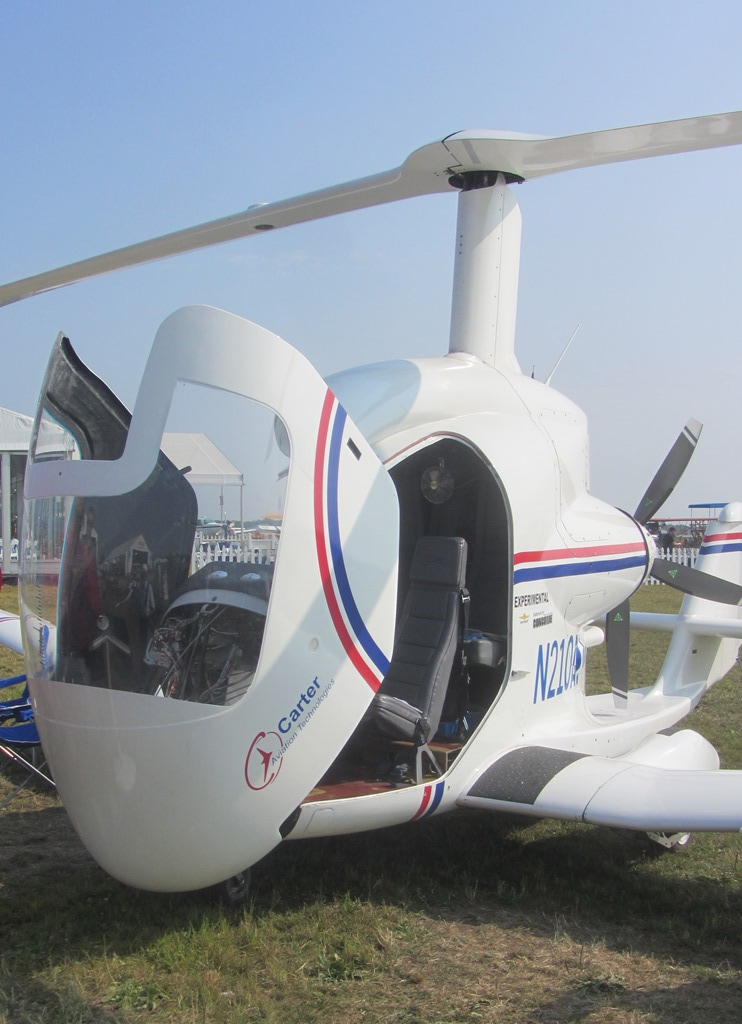
Carter PAV
Unpowered rotor, pusher propeller, wings.

== See also ==
- Gyrodyne
- Convertiplane
