= AAI Corporation =

Aerospace manufacturer in Maryland, US

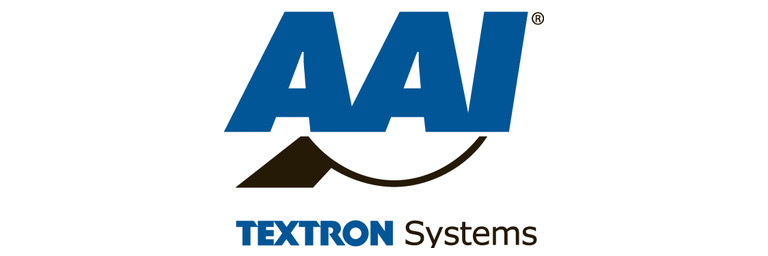
- Type: Subsidiary
- Industry: Aerospace industry Defence industry
- Products: Aircraft, unmanned aerial vehicles
- Parent: Textron

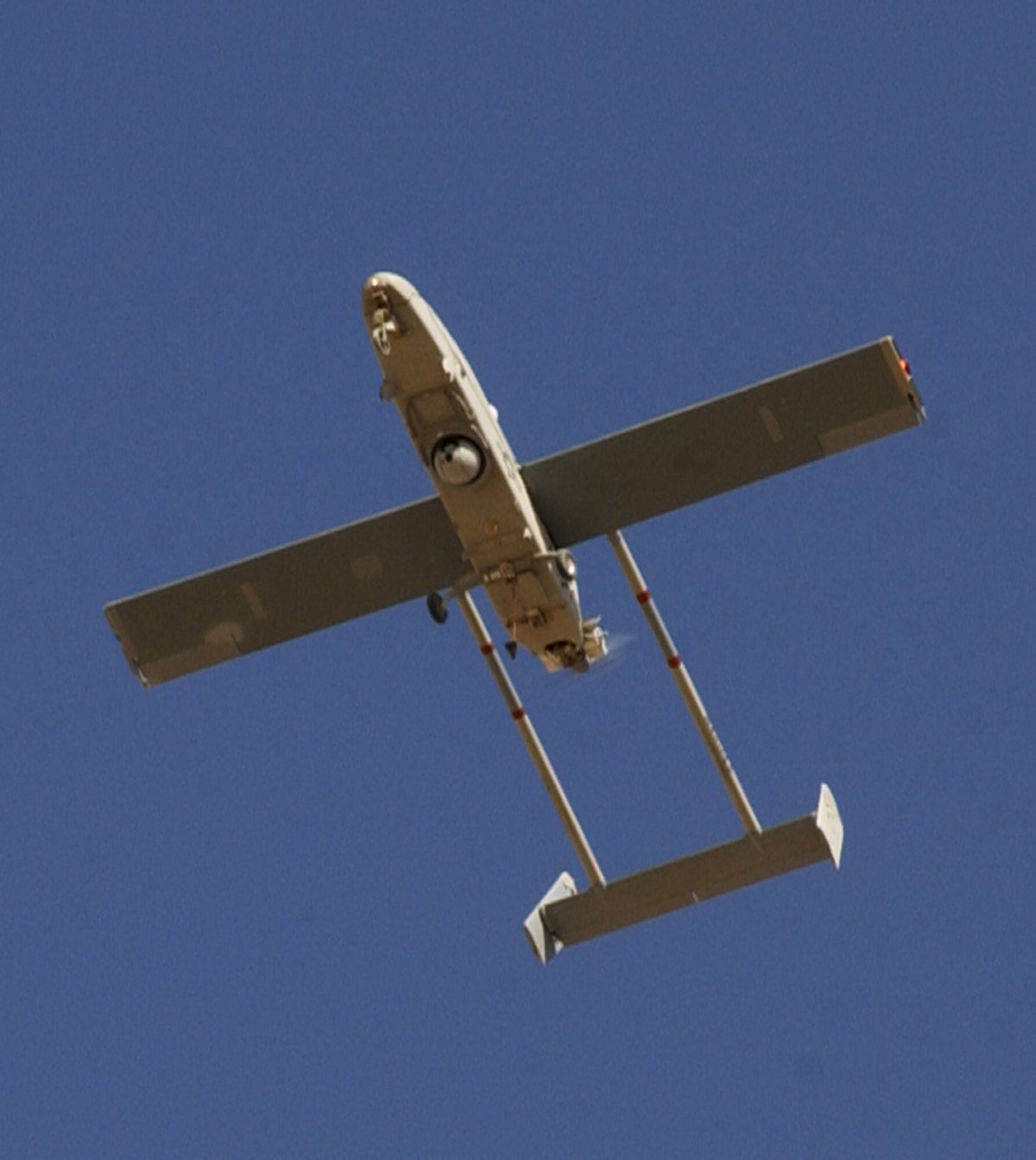
The RQ-2 Pioneer, an unmanned reconnaissance aircraft developed jointly by AAI Corporation and Israel Aircraft Industries

AAI Corporation is an aerospace and defense development and manufacturing firm, located in Hunt Valley, Maryland, US. Formerly a wholly owned subsidiary of United Industrial Corporation, AAI was acquired by Textron in 2007. It currently operates as a unit of Textron Systems and employs more than 2,000.

AAI's products and services include unmanned aircraft and ground control technologies; training and simulation systems; automated aerospace test and maintenance equipment; armament systems; and logistical, engineering, supply chain and operational support services, multi-turreted tracked ground combat vehicles. The company's customers include the United States Department of Defense (DoD) and its prime contractors, allied foreign government ministries of defense, and other United States federal agencies.

== History ==
AAI Corporation originated as Aircraft Armaments, Inc. in August 1950, founded by six aviation and defense industry professionals. It was renamed AAI Corporation in the late 1950s.

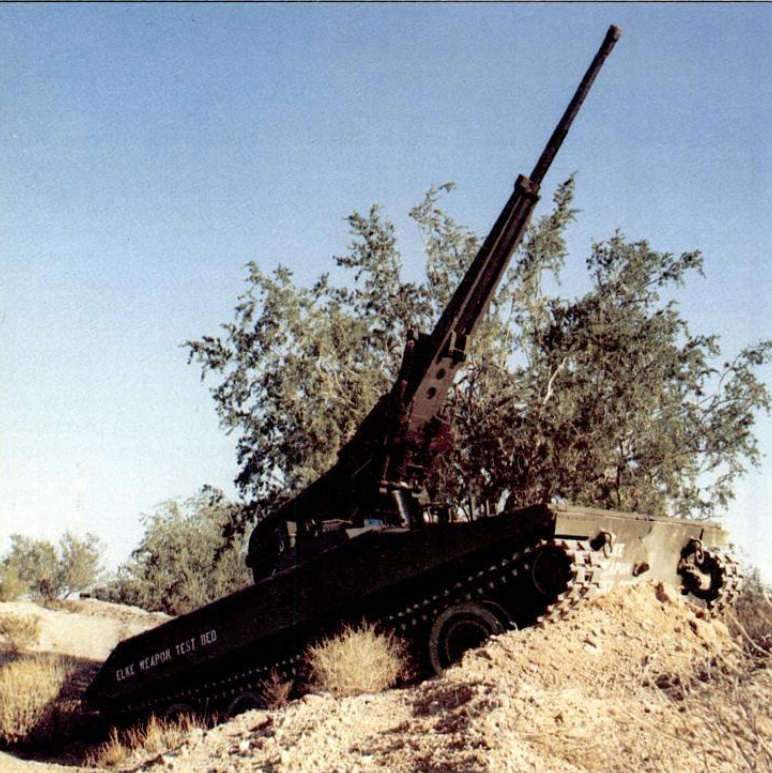
ELKE Weapon Test Bed

AAI's parent company, United Industrial Corporation (UIC), was founded as Hayes Body Corporation in the early 1900s. Renamed many years later, UIC was admitted into the New York Stock Exchange for trading on December 15, 1964.

From 1994 to 2004, AAI partnered with the Czech firm, Škoda, in a joint venture to manufacture trolley buses. The joint venture, named Electric Transit, Inc., supplied 330 trolley buses to San Francisco and Dayton before being dissolved in 2004.

On 22 June 2006 Aerosonde Ltd was acquired by AAI.

Textron acquired AAI and other subsidiaries of UIC with its purchase of the parent company for approximately $1.1 billion in 2007. AAI became part of Textron's helicopter subsidiary, Bell Textron, in the acquisition.

Today, AAI owns or occupies more than 1,100,000 square feet (100,000 m^{2}) of office and manufacturing space across Australia, the United Kingdom and the USA.

As of May 2014, AAI had been made into three parts: Unmanned Systems, Support Solutions, and Electronic Systems. The company is still registered as an active corporation in the State of Maryland under the name, AAI Corporation.

== Products & services ==
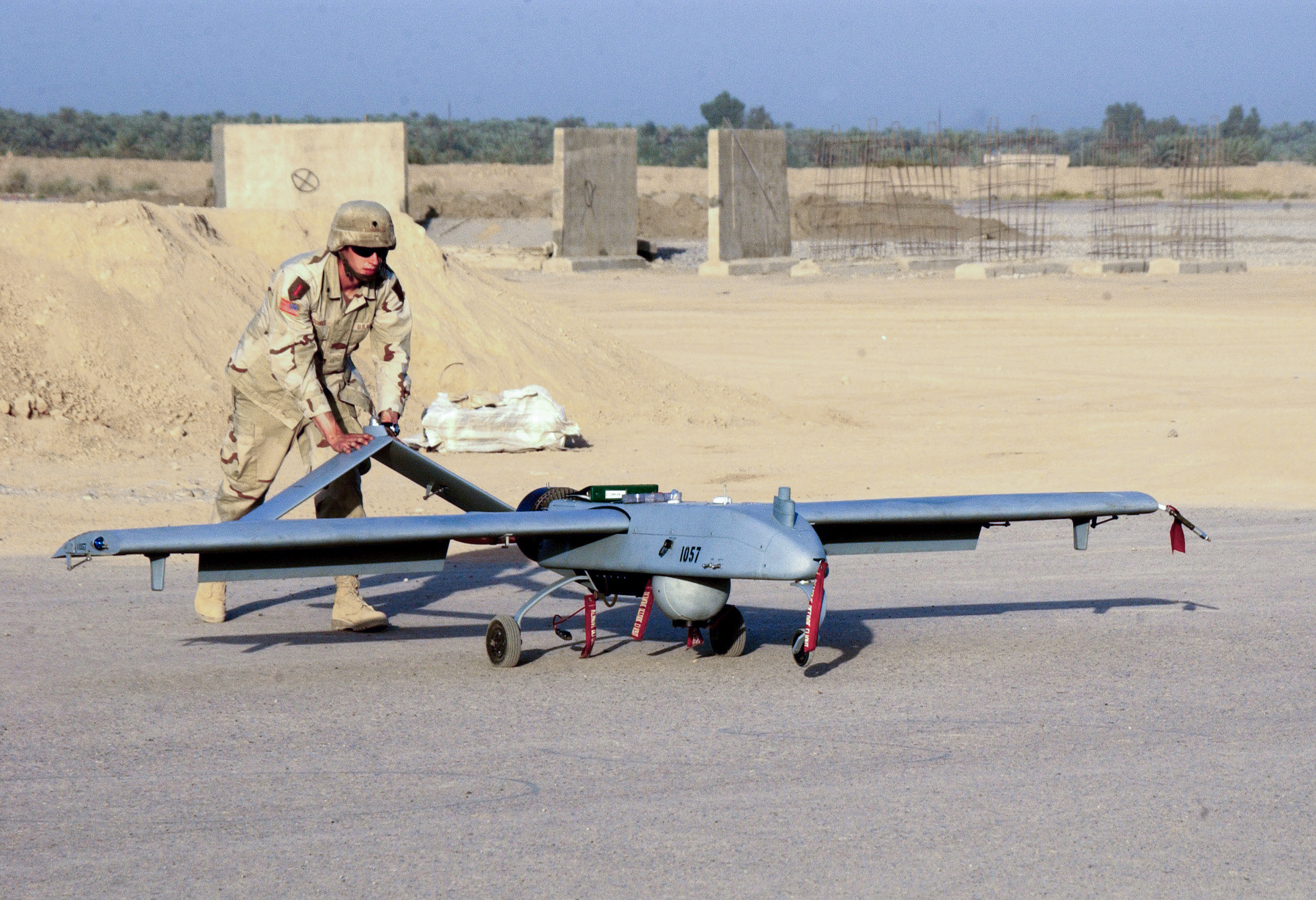
Shadow 200 UAV in Iraq

=== Unmanned systems ===
AAI is one of a limited number of companies engaged in the design and full-rate production of a successfully fielded, operational unmanned aircraft system (UAS) for the DoD. AAI first began development work on the unmanned systems product line in 1985, winning a competitive fly-off with its Pioneer Remotely Piloted Vehicle.

The company's unmanned aircraft systems include the Shadow 200 Tactical UAS, which is designated RQ-7B by the U.S. Army, as well as the Shadow 400 and 600 systems. As of July, 2014, Shadow systems had accumulated more than 920,000 flight hours, with more than 90 percent of those hours in support of U.S. and allied combat operations in Iraq and Afghanistan.

The company's UAS capabilities expanded with the 2006 acquisition of Australian UAS manufacturer Aerosonde Pty. Ltd. This fleet's newest model is the Aerosonde Mark 4.7 small unmanned aircraft system. In late 2009, AAI conducted a shipboard demonstration of the system aboard the M80 Stiletto ship.

In September 2008, AAI announced that it had teamed with Aeronautics Ltd. to provide the Orbiter miniature UAS in selected markets.

The company's One System Ground Control Station is fielded as part of the Shadow Tactical UAS, as well as the One System Portable Ground Control Station and One System Remote Video Terminal.

On 16 November 2009, AAI entered a 40-year exclusive license agreement with Carter Aviation Technologies concerning a possible autonomous slowed rotor/compound aircraft with potential for increased speed (250 knots) and range (1300 nautical miles) delivering 3000 pounds cargo, compared to traditional rotorcraft. It is to be based on the Carter PAV. In 2014, Carter said they bought back the license from AAI and is seeking production partners outside USA.

AAI was developing an RQ-7 Shadow, also with a Carter rotor on top for vertical take-off and landing, to fly in 2012. AAI also intends to use this technology as the basis for their proposal to DARPAs "Flying Humvee" Transformer program.

In March 2019, the U.S. Army selected Martin UAV and AAI Corporation to "provide unmanned aircraft systems for platoons to try out as candidates to replace the Shadow tactical UAS." The companies signed a contract for delivery over a three-year period. They will deliver systems to six platoons in order to evaluate them during combat and training rotations. The Army seeks better acoustics and runway independence as compared to the old Shadow. The Army is expected to decide "over the course of fiscal 2020" whether it will proceed in replacing Shadow.

=== Logistics & Technical Services ===
AAI provides a variety of engineering, logistical, maintenance, repair and overhaul services for the company's own platforms as well as those of other original equipment manufacturers.

Its customers include the U.S. Army, Air Force, Navy and Marine Corps, for which the company supports a wide variety of operational systems. The Logistics & Technical Services business unit also provides depot maintenance equipment and services to domestic and international military aviation customers.

=== Test & Training Systems ===
AAI's test systems are used by every branch of the U.S. military. The Joint Systems Electronic Combat Systems Tester is part of the DoD's family of testers and currently supports flight-line electronic warfare testing for several U.S. military aircraft.

The company's Advanced Boresight Equipment systems are used to align avionics and weapons systems onboard military aircraft and helicopters. AAI also produces radar simulators that simulate varied threat signals to test the functionality of radar warning receivers and cockpit displays and controls.

AAI acquired ESL Defence Limited in 2005. Based in the UK, ESL designs and manufactures electro-optical, infrared, and ultraviolet test and simulation/stimulation products for use on flight lines, in aircraft maintenance facilities, and at military test and evaluation ranges.

AAI also provides functional automated test equipment for satellite, electronic and other systems.

=== Training Systems ===
AAI has capabilities in the design, production, and sustainment of maintenance training devices such as the C-17 Globemaster, the F-22 Raptor, and most recently, the F-35 Lightning II Joint Strike Fighter.

AAI modified and produced state-of-the-art, simulation-based maintenance training devices for the F-22 Raptor providing students with instruction in ground maintenance, aircraft servicing, and munitions loading.

The armament training device provides hands-on skill development pertaining to the removal, installation, inspection, operation, and checkout tasks of the gun, gun doors, left main weapons bay door system and launchers, left side weapons bay launcher, right wing pylon, partial fuel system, stores management system, and weapons safing system. The trainer uses real aircraft support equipment including munitions and the portable maintenance aid (PMA).

The landing gear training device allows instruction on maintenance tasks on the landing gear systems, environmental control systems, hydraulics, and electrical and electronic warfare systems. The device supports nose and right main landing gear operation, and an operational arresting hook.

The aft fuselage training device is a mock-up of the left side wing, horizontal stabilizer, vertical stabilizer, engine bay, forward engine bay door, and aft engine bay door, as well as numerous light systems and engine bay area components for removal and installation task training.

The F-35 Lightning II aircraft system maintenance trainer provides student maintainers with training on ground operation, maintenance, fault isolation, and testing procedures in a simulated environment utilizing an interactive 3-D virtual aircraft environment. This realistic, 3-D virtual vehicle environment, as well as 2-D panels and displays allow students to navigate throughout the F-35 aircraft during maintenance training and to select the virtual support equipment and tools required. A real F-35 portable maintenance aid is connected at each student station, allowing the student to monitor the virtual aircraft functions, run diagnostics, and display technical and task documentation.

AAI's training systems are utilized by U.S. and allied international military customers.

Products include naval, electronic warfare, air defense, radar, and UAS training systems.

=== Advanced Systems ===
AAI's Advanced Systems unit primarily investigates and responds to new and emerging customer needs and markets. The company is currently working on the U.S. Army's Lightweight Small Arms Technologies project. It has also developed the PDCue Gunshot Detection System and TDCue acoustic detection systems for the U.S. Army and Marine Corps.

== List of AAI products ==
=== Aircraft ===
- AAI RQ-2 Pioneer
- AAI RQ-7 Shadow

=== Arms ===
- M85 machine gun
- AAI In-Line
- LSAT light machine gun
- AAI ACR
- XM274 ARES

=== Tanks ===
- T92 light tank
- HSTV/L "High Survivability Test Vehicle/Lightweight"
- RDF/LT "Rapid Deployment Force/Light Tank"
