= T92 light tank =

US light tank prototype of the 1950s

76-mm Gun Tank, T92
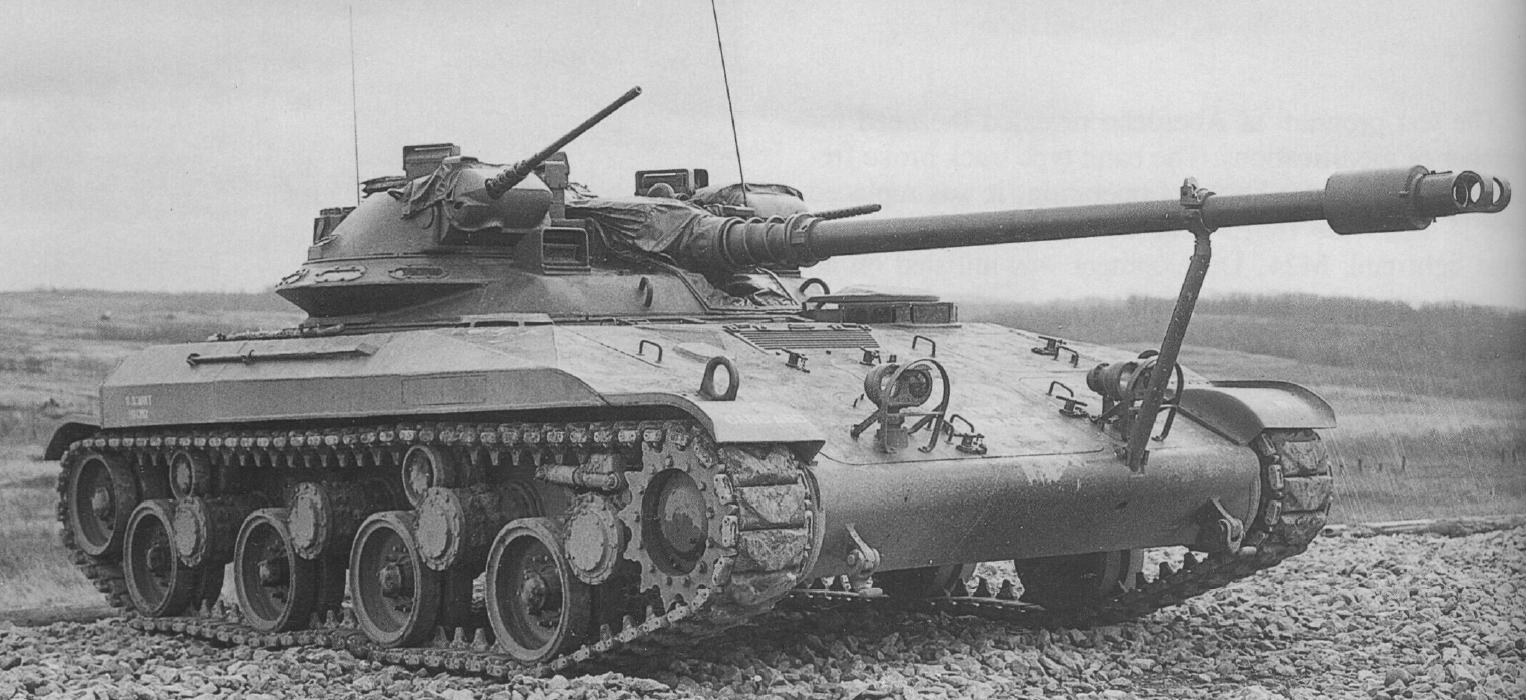
- T92 during its original trials
- Type: Light tank
- Place of origin: United States

Production history
- Designer: Aircraft Armaments, Incorporated (AAI)
- Designed: 1954–1958
- Manufacturer: AAI
- Produced: 1956–1958
- No. built: 2 prototypes

Specifications
- Mass: 18 tons
- Length: 6.273 m (20 ft, 7 in) (4.8 m (15 ft, 9 in) without gun)
- Width: 3.149 m (10 ft, 4 in) (over the tracks)
- Height: 2.26 m (7 ft, 5 in) (over the periscopes)
- Crew: 4 (commander, gunner, loader and driver)
- Armor: 10 to 32 mm of steel
- Main armament: 76 mm T185E1 rifled tank gun (60 rounds)
- Secondary armament: 1× M2HB 12.7 mm heavy machine gun in right cupola (700 rounds); 2× M37 7.62 mm machine gun, one in the right cupola and one coaxial (5000 rounds)
- Engine: Continental AOI-628-1 8-cylinder opposed-piston gasoline engine 340 hp (250 kW) at 3200 RPM
- Power/weight: 18.3 hp (13.6 kW)/t
- Transmission: Allison XT-300, automatic (6 Fwd/2 Rwd)
- Suspension: Torsilastic
- Ground clearance: 43.1 cm (1 ft, 5 in)
- Fuel capacity: 682 liters (180 gal)
- Operational range: 338 km (210 mi)
- Maximum speed: 56 km/h (35 mph)

The T92 Light Tank, or 76-mm Gun Tank, T92, was an American light tank developed in the 1950s by Aircraft Armaments. It was designed as an airborne/airdropped replacement for the heavier M41 Walker Bulldog while retaining the mobility, protection level, and firepower of the latter. The unveiling of the Soviet PT-76 amphibious light tank pointed out that the future US light tank should be able to swim as well. Making the T92 amphibious was deemed impractical and the light gun tank program was cancelled in June 1958.

== Design ==
=== Armament ===
The T92 had an unusual large cleft, low-profile, turret mounting a high-velocity 76 mm T185E1 rifled gun in a cradle housing between two armored cupolas. The T185E1 was ballistically identical to the 76 mm gun M32 of the M41 light tank but it had a quick change tube and was mounted upside down to accommodate the semi-automatic loader. Empty cartridges were automatically ejected outside the vehicle through a small hatch in the rear of the turret.
The cupola on the right side of the gun was occupied by the tank commander and was armed with a M2HB heavy machine gun. The gunner was located in the left cupola which was armed with a M37 machine gun. The loader was seated on a saddle, in the left rear of the turret, behind the gunner and a seven-round ready rack. He also had access to a 24-round ammunition dispenser rack situated behind the commander seat. 28 additional rounds were stowed in two separated compartments on either side of the rear doors, behind each aft bladder-type fuel tanks.

=== Armor ===
The hull of the T92 consisted of a welded assembly of armor steel castings and plates. Though the protection level was essentially the same as on the M41 light tank, the use of high obliquity surfaces and some lighter materials allowed a weight saving of nearly 8 tons. Aluminum alloy access panels were fitted on the compartments for the powerpack, the batteries and the APU. The fenders were made of aluminum alloy and fiberglass reinforced plastic.
The engine compartment in the right front hull was enclosed by welded steel firewalls. The APU and the batteries compartment were in front of the driver compartment and also separated by a bulkhead. The exhaust duct occupied the entire length of the fender above the right track. The front part of left sponsons (above the left track) housed a fuel tank for the APU and the central and rear parts were used as stowage compartments.

=== Running gear ===
The T92 rode on four roadwheels per side, and the rear road wheels served as adjustable trailing idlers to control the track tension. The suspension of the T92 included the Goodrich's Torsilastic system which consisted of eight cylinders mounted to the hull sides. The Torsilastic suspension was later used on the M50 Ontos fire support vehicle and on the LVTP-5 amphibious armored fighting vehicle.

	T92
Length	247.5 in (6.3 m)
Width	124.0 in (3.1 m)
Height	89.1 in (2.3 m) (over periscopes)
Ground clearance	17.0 in (43.2 cm)
Top speed	35 mph (56 km/h)
Fording	40 in (1.0 m)
Max grade	60 percent
Max trench	6 ft (1.8 m)
Max wall	30 in (0.8 m)
Range	210 mi (340 km)
Power	340 hp (250 kW) at 3200 rpm
Power-to-weight ratio	18.3 hp/ST (15.0 kW/t))
Torque	587 lb⋅ft (800 N⋅m) at 2500 rpm
Weight, combat loaded	37,160 lb (16,860 kg)
Ground pressure	9.6 psi (66 kPa) (T110 track); 10.9 psi (75 kPa) (T85E1 track)
Main armament	T185E1 76 mm
Elevation	+20° / -10°
Traverse rate	15 seconds/360°
Elevation rate	4°/second
Main gun ammo	60 rounds
Firing rate	12 rounds per minute
