= Aerial Reconfigurable Embedded System =

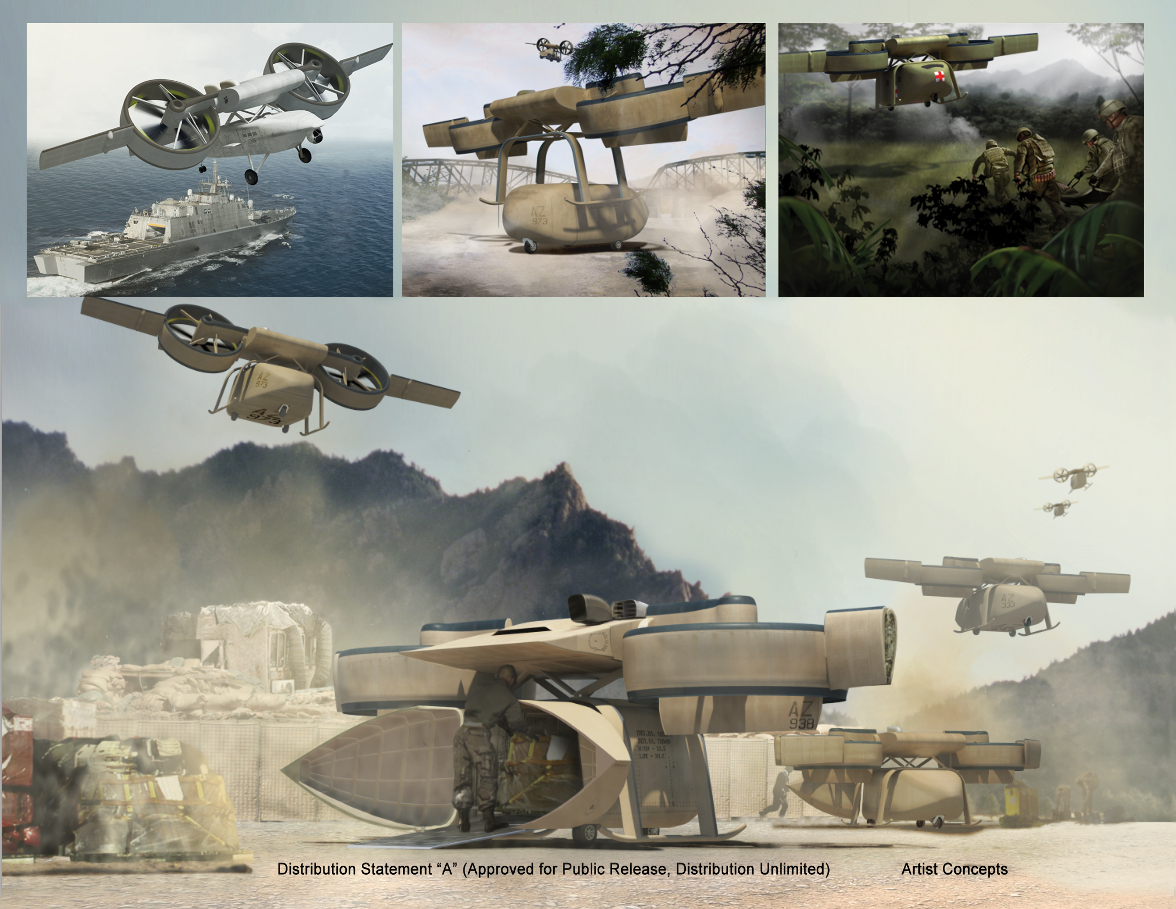
DARPA ARES scenarios

The Aerial Reconfigurable Embedded System (ARES) was a concept for an unmanned VTOL flight module that can transport various payloads. The concept started as the TX (Transformer) in 2009 for a terrain-independent transportation system centered on a ground vehicle that could be configured into a VTOL air vehicle and carry four troops. ARES' primary function was the same as TX, to use flight to avoid ground-based transportation threats like ambushes and IEDs for units that don't have helicopters for those missions. It was to be powered by twin tilting ducted fans and have its own power system, fuel, digital flight controls, and remote command-and-control interfaces. The flight module would have different detachable mission modules for specific purposes including cargo delivery, CASEVAC, and ISR. Up to 3,000 lb (1,400 kg) of payload would be carried by a module.

In May 2019, DARPA cancelled the ARES research effort due to significant cost growth and delays.

The designation XV-25 was assigned to the Piasecki ARES design.

== Transformer TX ==
DARPA TX (Transformer)
- Type: Roadable aircraft
- Place of origin: United States

Specifications
- Length: >30 ft (910 cm)
- Width: >8.5 ft (260 cm)
- Height: >9 ft (270 cm)
- Crew: 4
- Payload capacity: 1,000 lb (450 kg)
- Operational range: 250 NM (460 km)

The DARPA TX, or Transformer, was a 5-year, 3-phase roadable aircraft effort coordinated by DARPA for the United States military.

The objective of the Transformer (TX) program was to demonstrate a four-person vehicle that provided enhanced logistics and mobility though hybrid flyable/roadable capabilities. This presented an unprecedented capability to avoid traditional and asymmetrical threats while avoiding road obstructions. TX would enable enhanced company operations of future missions with applicable use in strike and raid, intervention, interdiction, insurgency/counterinsurgency, reconnaissance, medical evacuation, and logistical supply. The TX vehicles were to have Vertical Takeoff and Landing (VTOL) capability with a minimum combat range of 250 nautical miles on a single tank of fuel.

The primary focus of the TX program was the development and demonstration of an integrated suite of critical technologies to enable dual-mode transportation, VTOL capability, efficient flight performance, and a combat range comparable to present day rotorcraft. It was envisioned that the program would, at a minimum, demonstrate the ability to build a ground vehicle that was capable of configuring into a VTOL air vehicle that provided sufficient flight performance and range, while carrying a payload that was representative of four troops with gear. Key performance parameters were specified to show specific operational utility. The program was divided into two separate tasks; Task A would develop and integrate a full vehicle and Task B would develop individual critical technologies components for the full vehicle.

=== Function ===
The Marines, Air Force, special forces and National Guard had stated an interest in the vehicle. Marines may have used the Transformer as a tool for the Enhanced Company Operations concept.

The Marines would use the vehicle for amphibious assault and potentially eliminate the need for amphibious vehicles which are vulnerable to shore defenses and limited by their low speeds. Special ops would like to send vehicles unmanned to resupply special operators and then allow them to use that vehicle.

=== Design ===
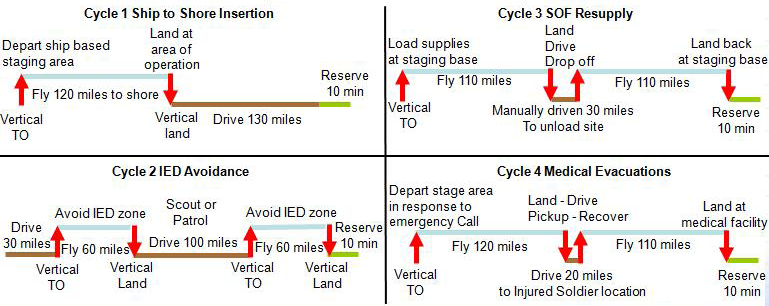
Requirements

Mobility

Its VTOL capability gave it the ability to avoid threats and obstacles. The TX was required to have a range of 250 nmi (460 km) on a single tank of fuel which may be attained through flight, land, or a combination of both.

Countermeasures

The vehicle was to be lightly armored, required only to handle small arms fire. Its VTOL capability gave it the ability to avoid threats.

=== Foreign developments ===
Russia will develop a vehicle similar to the TX for the Russian Airborne Troops. The vehicle will be a hybrid of a light combat vehicle and an attack helicopter with a crew of three to four people, and be developed by 2030.

== Development ==
External image
- AAI/Textron's Transformer proposal

Conception

DARPA was at first not interested in traditional rotary-wing aircraft, but shrouded rotor concepts might have been considered.

Phase I

The first phase consisted of trade studies to evaluate future technologies as well as conceptual design of both a prototype and a production vehicle.

No more than 2 contracts were to be awarded in the $65m Phase I. In September however only AAI's proposal was selected, for $3m. This proposal built on the CarterCopter slowed rotor technology, and incorporated deployable surfaces technology from Terrafugia. The United States Army Research Laboratory (Vehicle Technology Directorate) was contracted to conduct rotor analysis. Other partners were Bell Helicopter and Textron Marine & Land Systems, sister companies of AAI and subsidiaries of Textron. Lockheed Martin, Piasecki Aircraft, Ricardo Inc., Carnegie Mellon University, Pratt & Whitney Rocketdyne, Aurora Flight Sciences, ThinGap, Terrafugia and Metis Design are also connected to the project.

In October 2010, Lockheed Martin, Piasecki Aircraft and its partners were also connected to Phase 1 of the program.

Pratt & Whitney Rocketdyne received a US$1 million contract to develop a Diesel engine called Enduro Core to power the Transformer.

Phase II — Design

In 2011, AAI and Lockheed were chosen to proceed with Phase II of the project.

The 7,500 lb AAI vehicle was proposed to be equipped with a 1,200 shp Honeywell HTS900 turboshaft engine to power four electric wheel motors or the 56-inch ducted fan, and spin up the 50-foot rotor. Ground speed was up to 80 mph; flight speed range was 50 to 155 kt; maximum altitude was 10,000 ft.

The 7,000 lb Lockheed vehicle had two turboshaft engines in a 41 ft wing with tilting 8.5 ft ducted fans, giving a flight speed of 130 kt, while a Pratt & Whitney EnduroCore heavy-fuel rotary engine powers the four electric wheel motors for ground motion.

At AUVSI 2012, Lockheed Martin spoke openly about their status on the project. AAI Corporation was silent about their involvement details, but confirmed they were still in the competition. At the time of expo, neither company had prototype vehicles, but had designs and scale models of their concept vehicles. Previously, both passed DARPA's preliminary design review, which involved computer modeling. Lockheed's vehicle relied on two huge turbo-shaft fans and folding wings fixed to a turret above the cab to provide lift and thrust during flight. A key component is computerized flight. Because it will be used by soldiers rather than trained pilots, vehicle operation will be mostly automated. One idea is to have a computer screen to simply plot GPS points to chart a flight path. The fans rotate 90 degrees on the turret from their stowed positions just in front of and behind the cab to their in-flight positions on both sides of it. Control of takeoff, landing, and flight is controlled by the computer, although soldiers onboard would be able to alter their course or perform an emergency landing. The automated flight technology will be similar to the kind used by the F-35 Lightning II. The lift fans of Lockheed's vehicle provide hover while AAI's did not. AAI's vehicle could be made lighter, which gave greater ability to up-armor.

Phase III — Manufacture of the prototype.

The winning team from Phase II will produce a Prototype Vehicle (PV) with limited features, ready to fly in mid-2015. DARPA aims for a full-featured Field Vehicle (FV) to cost around $1 million, compared to $400,000 for a Humvee and $4 million for a light helicopter.

=== Previous concepts ===
AVX concept

AVX Aircraft Company proposed a concept with coaxial rotors. Ducted fans were intended as propulsion in air as well as on ground.<hugojavierduranmiranda=autogenerated1>Quick, Darren.

Logi and Trek offered the Tyrannos, a tilt-fan vehicle.

On September 10, 2024, the Piasecki ARES design conducted its first hover flight.

== Transition to ARES ==
In 2012, Lockheed and Piasecki Aircraft were selected for their design that combined a manned vehicle with an unmanned detachable ducted fan-powered flight module, which could operate by itself. A 2013 DARPA program review found limited interest in the flying car concept among the military services, leading to the ground vehicle being dropped and the program adapted to use the unmanned VTOL flight module delivery system as the Aerial Reconfigurable Embedded System (ARES). The pod-carrying facility will have assistance loading cargo and be able to unload autonomously. Remote control is possible, but it will have the ability to fly itself, enabling battlefield supply missions carrying cargo or personnel without risking pilots. Lockheed claims their craft can be configured for several missions including reconnaissance, medical evacuation, and strike. It is to carry a detachable payload module such as a cargo pod, casualty evacuation module, light vehicle, or even a small boat. The front section of the flight vehicle has management system computers that are controlled by a ground control station to plot its flight path.

Work on Phase III began in January 2014; Lockheed is to develop the flight control software, and Piasecki will build the flight module and systems. The fans are driven via two turboshafts housed in the center section. The constant-speed, variable-pitch fans and movable vanes in the duct exhausts provide control. The ARES module will be 8.5 ft (2.6 m) wide, 30 ft (9.1 m) long with the outboard wing panels stowed, and 42 ft (13 m) long unfolded. 7.5 ft (2.3 m)-diameter fans will be enclosed in ducts that are initially planned to be 8.5 ft in diameter, which may be increased in length to 3.05 m (10.0 ft). Optimum speed will be 130–150 knots (150–170 mph; 240–280 km/h), with a maximum speed of 200 knots (230 mph; 370 km/h), faster than a helicopter with a sling-load. A similar class of helicopter would require a 30.5 m (100 ft)-wide landing zone, double that of ARES, making 10 times more landing locations usable; the ARES would however be less fuel-efficient than a helicopter while hovering. The Army, Marine Corps, and Special Operations forces have shown interest in ARES demonstrations. DARPA and the contractors shall identify a transition partner if tests are successful. Lockheed expected flight testing of the ARES module in June 2016, but that was delayed until late 2017 because "some developmental items required some additional testing;" the drive train borrows gears from the CH-53E helicopter, but the proprotors, ducts, and other parts are all unique and brand new. The demonstrator has a maximum takeoff weight of 7,000 lb (3,200 kg) and is powered by two Honeywell HTS900 helicopter engines each generating 989 hp. While it is planned to fly at 170 knots (200 mph; 310 km/h) with a ceiling of 20,000 ft (6,100 m) and a mission radius of 175 mi (282 km), the production variant is planned to be able to cruise at 250 knots (290 mph; 460 km/h) with a mission radius similar to the V-22 Osprey.

== Sources ==
This article incorporates work from https://www.fbo.gov/index?s=opportunity&mode=form&id=9b745d803c1d206f16fd6f64542eadd6&tab=core&tabmode=list&print_preview=1, which is in the public domain as it is a work of the United States Army.
