= The Spirit of Butts' Farm =

First model aircraft to cross the Atlantic Ocean

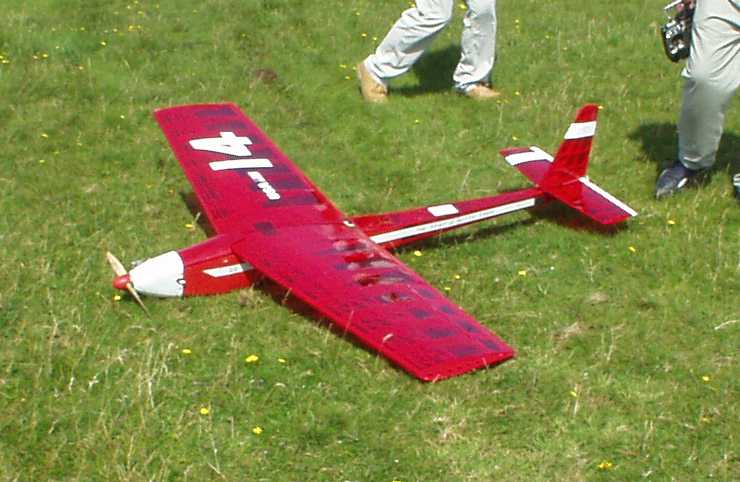
TAM 5, bearing the late Maynard Hill's AMA membership no."14".

The Spirit of Butts' Farm (also known as TAM 5) was the first model aircraft to cross the Atlantic Ocean on August 11, 2003. The aircraft was launched from Cape Spear ^{(47°31.216′N 52°37.428′W)} near St. John's, Newfoundland and Labrador, and landed at Mannin Beach ^{(53°26.462′N 10°7.892′W)} near Clifden, Ireland 38.9 hours later. It was recognized by the FAI as a double world record flight for its duration of 38h 52 min 19 sec and straight-line distance of 1,881.6 mi (3,028.1 km) using an autopilot, and using the Argos System for telemetry to track the flight's progress; the team's use of technology also spurred the FAI to create new record categories. The aircraft was controlled by autopilot for >99% of the flight in a manner similar to that used by the Insitu Aerosonde UAV "Laima" that crossed the Atlantic in 1998. The flight used 99.2% of its fuel and left only 1.5 US fluid ounces (44 ml) (or 44 minutes of flight time) remaining when it reached its destination.

The aircraft was built by a team led by Maynard Hill, a retired metallurgist. Hill had previously set 25 model airplane records and was inducted into the Model Aviation Hall of Fame in 1977. The Spirit of Butts' Farm was the 25th of 28 airframes the team had built in the attempt to cross the Atlantic; the five best models were selected for actual transatlantic flight attempts. The 25th airframe was the fifth selected for the record attempt and was redesignated TAM-5. Later, describing his reaction to learning that the flight had been successful, Hill said, "I just grabbed my wife, hugged her and cried like a baby."

The aircraft was named after R. Beecher Butts, an aviation enthusiast who allowed the use of his farm for testing of the aircraft. The name echoes that of the Spirit of St. Louis, the aircraft used by Charles Lindbergh in his transatlantic flight. The aircraft is on display at the National Model Aviation Museum. A backup plane for the transatlantic effort is in the collection of the National Air and Space Museum.

An article on the flight can be found in the October 2003 edition of Model Aviation Canada magazine.

Name:	TAM-5
Weight:	Dry: 5.96 lb (2.705 kg); Fully fueled: 10.99 lb (4.987 kg)
Time:	38 hours, 52 minutes, 19 seconds
Start time:	2003-08-09 22:15:41 UTC (chosen for favorable Atlantic weather and to arrive during Irish daylight)
End time:	2003-08-11 13:08:00 UTC
Distance:	1,881.6 mi (3,028.1 km)
Flight Altitude:	Approx. 1,000 feet (300 m)
Fuel tank:	Approx. 118 US fluid ounces (3.5 L)
Fuel:	Coleman lantern fuel with 16 US fl oz (470 ml) of Indopol L-50 lubricant additive per 1 US gal (3,785 mL). Single fuel tank in the fuselage at the CG point (normal: alcohol)
Engine:	O.S. Engines FS-61 0.61 cubic inch (10cc) four-stroke, CH Ignition CDI spark ignition system, carburetor from a "PET" O.S. 0.10 two-stroke engine
Engine modifications:	Smaller valves in engine, custom carburetor mounted remotely, triple fuel filtration down to 1 micron, pressurized fuel tank using crankcase pressure, custom power takeoff to run electronics
Cruising speed:	42 mph (68 km/h), the transatlantic flight had an average ground speed of 48 mph (77 km/h) including tailwinds
Size:	Wingspan 72.1 in (1,831 mm), Length 74 in (1,880 mm)
Propeller:	Zinger wooden propeller, 14 in (356 mm) diameter, 12 in (305 mm) pitch with trailing edge sanded to razor sharpness, ~3900 RPM

The Society for Technical Aeromodel Research (S.T.A.R.) was organized to help support the costs of the project.
