= Bell Wing Ding =

1963 experimental compound helicopter

Wing Ding

General information
- Type: Experimental compound helicopter
- National origin: United States
- Manufacturer: Bell Helicopter

History
- First flight: 1963
- Developed from: Bell 47

The Bell Wing Ding was a 1960s compound helicopter built by Bell Helicopter.

== Design and development ==
Bell's intent was to develop an aircraft that would be able to lift payloads greater than that of a standard helicopter when it was hovering, and to take advantage of a standard aircraft's conventional takeoff and landing.

The aircraft was built around a standard 1958 Bell 47G-2A-1 helicopter, a 25 ft (7.6 m) wing sourced from a Piper Comanche monoplane was positioned located immediately behind the canopy and above the engine. The wing had a slightly tapered planform and no dihedral. Flaps and ailerons were incorporated into the wing's trailing edge. A small all-flying elevator was located just ahead of the tail rotor, and the ventral fin was increased in size. The original skid undercarriage was replaced with a 4-wheeled landing gear which the early Bell 47 helicopters had been fitted with. The rotor's mast angle would be varied in flight.

When initially tested, two streamline fuel tanks were fitted just outboard of the fuselage, though these were later shifted to be at the wingtips.

== Operational history ==
The Wing Ding first flew at Amon Carter Field in Fort Worth, Texas in May 1963 and tests continued through to May 1964. It was given the FAA registration N6723D with that being kept active through to 2007. According to Jane's All the World's Aircraft, the Wing Ding had taken off and landed with forward runs, as well as making steep helicopter-type descents. It also had been flown cross-country at 100 mph (160 km/h). The wings proved to be too large for acceptable handling qualities and performance.

== Specifications ==
Data from Jane's All the World's Aircraft 1963-64

General characteristics

- Crew: 2
- Length: 31 ft 7 in (9.63 m)
- Wingspan: 25 ft (7.6 m)
- Height: 9 ft 3 in (2.82 m)
- Powerplant: 1 × Lycoming VO-435 , 240 hp (180 kW)
- Main rotor diameter: 37 ft 9 in (11.51 m)
- Main rotor area: 1,119 sq ft (104.0 m^{2})

Performance

- Cruise speed: 87 kn (100 mph, 160 km/h)

== See also ==
Related development

- Bell 533
- Sikorsky S-72
