= Aerosonde =

Australian UAV manufacturer

Aerosonde Ltd
- Headquarters: Australia
- Products: UAV aircraft
- Parent: AAI Corporation, Textron Systems
- Website: Homepage

Aerosonde Ltd, now part of Textron Systems Unmanned Systems, is an Australian-based developer and manufacturer of unmanned aerial vehicles, including the AAI Corporation Aerosonde series. The company has customers in Australia, Asia and North America who use its vehicles for reconnaissance and meteorological applications.

== History ==
The Aerosonde platform, then the sole product of Insitu Inc., gained prominence on 21 August 1998 when an Aerosonde "Laima" became the first unmanned aerial vehicle to cross the North Atlantic, covering a 3270 km route in a time of 26 hrs 45 min.

On 22 June 2006, Aerosonde Ltd was acquired by the AAI Corporation. AAI was acquired in 2007 by Textron.

== Aircraft ==
Summary of aircraft built by Aerosonde
Model name	First flight	Number built	Type
AAI Corporation Aerosonde	1998	1+	UAV
