= Bell 533 =

Research helicopter built by Bell Helicopter

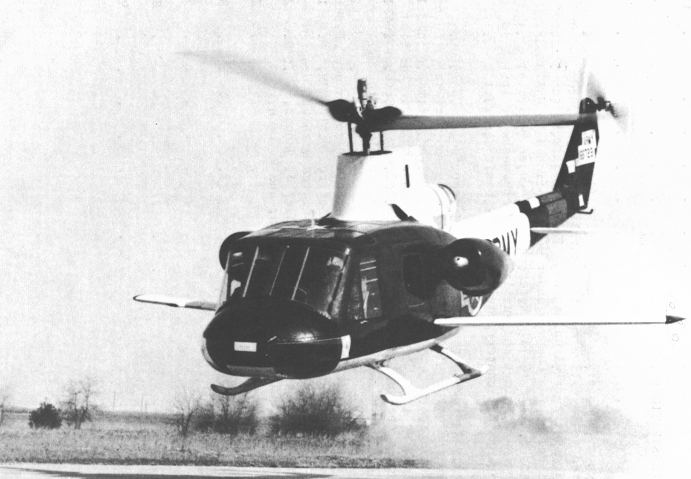
- Bell 533 with engines and wings added

General information
- Type: Research helicopter
- National origin: United States
- Manufacturer: Bell Helicopter
- Status: On display, Fort Eustis, Virginia
- Primary user: United States Army
- Number built: 1

History
- First flight: 10 August 1962
- Developed from: YH-40

The Bell 533 was a research helicopter built by Bell Helicopter under contract with the United States Army during the 1960s, to explore the limits and conditions experienced by helicopter rotors at high airspeeds. The helicopter was a YH-40—a preproduction version of the UH-1 Iroquois—modified and tested in several helicopter and compound helicopter configurations. The Bell 533 was referred to as the High Performance Helicopter (HPH) by the Army, and reached a top speed of 274.6 knots (508.6 km/h; 316.0 mph) in 1969, before being retired.

== Design and development ==
The U.S. Army began a program to study improvements to current helicopters that could be demonstrated by testing. Analyses by three helicopter companies showed that performance could be greatly improved. Bell Helicopter was one of the participants and investigated improvements to the UH-1B Iroquois. After the study, Bell submitted a proposal for the High Performance Helicopter. On 7 August 1961, the Army's Transportation Research and Engineering Command (TRECOM) awarded a contract to Bell Helicopter for a high-performance helicopter to conduct research.

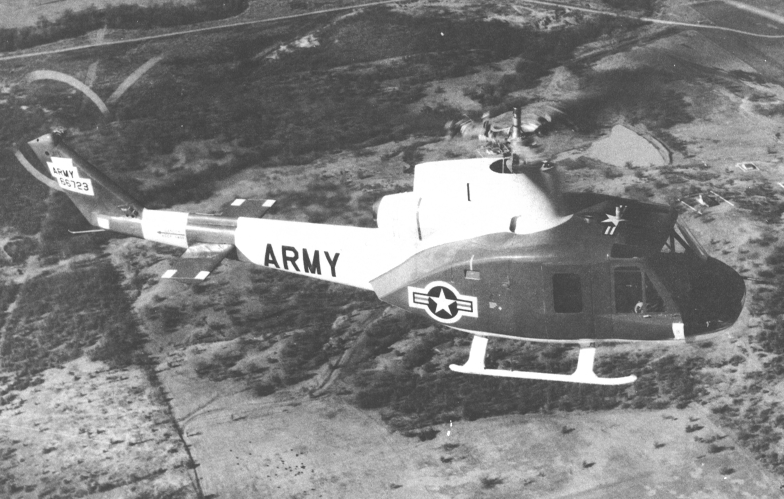
The basic High Performance Helicopter

In response, Bell built the Model 533 from a YH-40-BF, one of the six preproduction UH-1s. The dynamic components of the YH-40 were updated with components designed for the UH-1B. The research for the contract was split into two phases; phase one would be to determine the benefits of an overall reduction in drag, phase two would determine the benefits of auxiliary thrust.

The Bell 533 was flight tested in three main configurations. The first configuration was the basic YH-40 helicopter with drag reduction changes. The second configuration added a pair of jet engines for additional thrust. The third configuration added swept wings for extra lift.

== Operational history ==
=== Initial testing ===
During the first phase, a general clean-up of the airframe was performed to reduce drag. New aerodynamic fairings were developed using fiberglass honeycomb sandwich for the rear fuselage, a cambered vertical stabilizer was developed which, in cruise flight, aerodynamically unloaded the tail rotor. The skid landing gear also had streamlined fairings applied to it and the rotor mast was replaced by a mast that could be tilted in-flight.

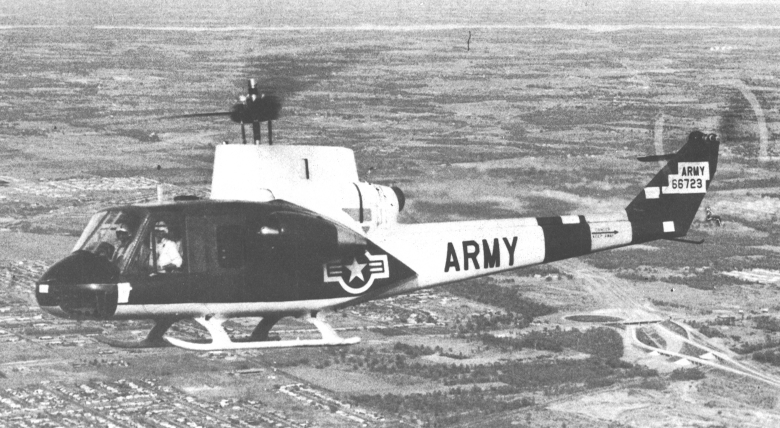
Bell 533 with jet engines added

The reconfigured helicopter was first tested in the NASA Ames Research Center wind tunnel, which confirmed that the modifications had significantly reduced the aircraft's drag. The 533 made its maiden flight on 10 August 1962 at Bell's Fort Worth, Texas headquarters utilizing the two-bladed UH-1B rotor. Before beginning the program flight testing, the helicopter was fitted with a gimbal-mounted three-bladed rotor. Modifications to the flight controls allowed either rotor to easily be fitted to the aircraft in a short time, and the three-bladed rotor could be mounted on the gimbal or rigidly to the mast. In this configuration, the 533 achieved a true airspeed of 150 knots (170 mph; 280 km/h) in straight-and-level flight.

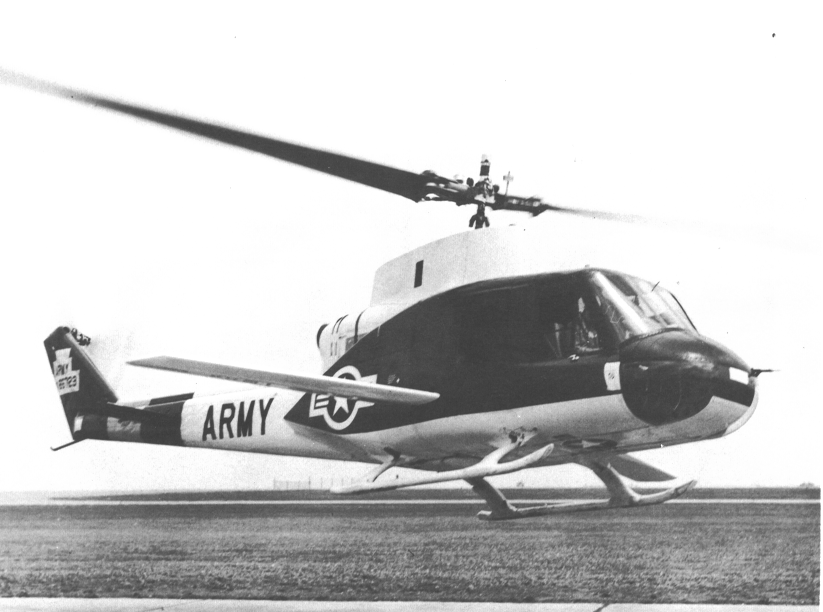
Bell 533 with wings, without engines

The Army funded the second phase to study the effects of auxiliary propulsion on the helicopter. Bell configured the 533 with two 26.8 feet (8.17 m) swept-back wings. The sweep of the wings was adjusted by maintenance personnel on the ground. Later in the program, the tilt of the wings was linked to the collective control to limit lift and to control rotor speed during autorotational profiles. After flight tests to determine the characteristics of the aircraft with the wings installed, the wings were removed.

Starting on 21 October 1963, Bell began test flights with two Continental CAE J69-T-9 turbojet engines in nacelles mounted directly to the aft portion of the fuselage. The thrust from the two 920-pound (4.09 kN) thrust engines caused turbulent airflow over the standard elevators, so an additional elevator was mounted on the vertical fin on the opposite side of the tail rotor. Following the modification, flight tests were resumed on 2 March 1964, with both wings and engines mounted. In this configuration, the Bell 533 achieved 186 knots (214 mph; 344 km/h) using maximum auxiliary thrust.

=== Independent testing ===
In April 1964, contracted testing was completed with the Army. Bell immediately fitted the two-bladed rotor with tapered blade tip caps for the company's own independent testing. The blade tip modification allowed the helicopter to reach 193 knots (222 mph; 357 km/h) using the maximum auxiliary thrust from the Continental turbojets. In an effort to achieve even higher speeds, Bell removed the J69-T-9 engines and replaced them with 1,700-pound (7.56 kN) thrust J69-T-29 engines. The additional thrust helped make the 533 the first rotorcraft in history to exceed 200 knots (230 mph; 370 km/h), reaching 205 knots (236 mph; 380 km/h) on 15 October 1964.

Six months later, on 6 April 1965, the Bell 533 became the first rotorcraft to reach 217 knots (250 mph; 402 km/h). In addition to the higher speeds, Bell test pilots were able to demonstrate that the additional thrust from the auxiliary engines allowed the compound helicopter to maintain sustained 2 g turns at 60-degree bank angles.

=== Follow-on research ===
By early 1968, the Army and Bell were working together again to expand the envelope of the Model 533. Bell removed the wings previously used and replaced them with a stub wing mounted higher and further back on the airframe. Bell also replaced the J69 turbojets with Pratt & Whitney JT12A-3 (J60) engines, capable of producing 3,300 pounds (13.3 kN) of thrust each, mounting the new engines on the ends of the stub wings. Bell also modified the helicopter flight controls to change pitch control from inputs to the rotor during lower flight speeds to airplane-style elevator control during high-speed flight. On 15 April 1969, the Model 533 achieved its highest speed of 274.6 knots (316.0 mph; 508.6 km/h).

The final configuration of the Model 533 for the research contract was with a proprietary, four-bladed, flex-beam rigid rotor developed by Bell. Afterwards, the Model 533 was returned to its original two-bladed configuration and retired.

== Surviving aircraft ==
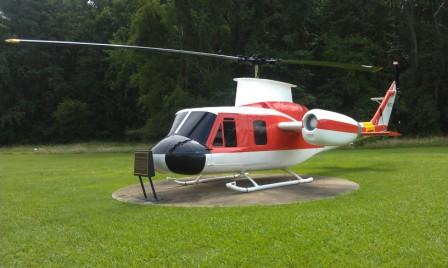
Bell 533 on display

The Model 533 is on display (in highest speed configuration) at the US Army Aviation Applied Technology Directorate, Fort Eustis, Virginia.

== See also ==
- Gyrodyne

Related development

- UH-1 Iroquois

Aircraft of comparable role, configuration, and era

- Bell Wing Ding
- Lockheed XH-51
- Sikorsky S-69
- Sikorsky S-72

Related lists

- List of VTOL aircraft
- List of experimental aircraft
