= CarterCopter =

Experimental autogyro

General information
- Type: Experimental compound autogyro
- Manufacturer: Carter Aviation Technologies
- Status: Crashed 17 June 2005
- Number built: 1

History
- First flight: 24 September 1998
- Developed into: Carter PAV

The CarterCopter is an experimental compound autogyro developed by Carter Aviation Technologies in the United States to demonstrate slowed rotor technology. On 17 June 2005, the CarterCopter became the first rotorcraft to achieve mu-1 (μ=1), an equal ratio of airspeed to rotor tip speed, but crashed on the next flight and has been inoperable since. It is being replaced by the Carter Personal Air Vehicle.

== Design and development ==
External images
- 1998 version
- Gallery of 10 photos
- CAD drawing

The CarterCopter is a pusher configuration autogyro with wings and a twin boom tail, intended as a prototype and a technology demonstrator. The rotor is a two-bladed design weighted with 55 pounds (25 kg) depleted uranium at each tip, and it is mounted on a tilting mast, allowing the wing to stay at optimum wing efficiency at all speeds. It is an all-composite design with a hull pressurized up to 0.69 bar.

The tricycle undercarriage is retractable, and has a large travel to allow for landing at up to 20 ft/sec without bounce. The aircraft had been modified and rebuilt after an accident (a gear-up landing) in 2003. NASA had funded $1 million of the development using three research grants, and the aircraft managed to accomplish at least one of NASA's five goals.

=== Concept ===
The CarterCopter concept is a gyrocopter with an unusually stiff, relatively heavy rotor, supplemented with conventional wings. At low speed, the vehicle flies as a gyrocopter, and can pre-spin the rotor for a vertical takeoff and very brief hover (about 5 seconds), and can land more or less vertically. Several technical challenges make flying a slow rotor difficult, but rotor stability is achieved through the combination of the rotor tip weights' location ahead of the blade center line (forward center of gravity) and the center of lift aft of the blade center line. At high speed (above about 100 mph) the aircraft flies mostly using the fixed wings, with the rotor simply windmilling. The rotor spins with a tip speed below airspeed, which means that the retreating blade flies completely stalled. On a helicopter this would cause massive lift dissymmetry and insoluble control issues but the fixed wings keep the aircraft in the air and stable.

The low rotation speed and flat feathering of the rotor means that it causes little drag, and the company claims that the aircraft would be potentially able to leverage the advantages of fixed wings as well as gyrocopters, giving almost all the capabilities of helicopters (except hovering) but with a relatively simple mechanical system. Carter Aviation also claims the system is safer than a typical fixed-wing aircraft, and others have remarked that the design is much safer, much less complex and less expensive than a helicopter, a tilt-rotor or the Boeing X-50 Dragonfly Canard Rotor/Wing. The CarterCopter should be capable of higher airspeeds now only achievable by fixed-wing aircraft, but also able to land like an autogyro in any small area in an emergency.

=== Takeoff ===
At takeoff the pilot angles the top rotor flat (zero angle of attack) and spins it to very high speed (between 365 and 425 rpm). The rotor is then disconnected from the engine and the angle of attack of the main rotor blades is increased suddenly so that the vehicle leaps into the air. The aircraft's main rotor has enough momentum due to heavy counterweights in the tips that it can hover for a short time safely. The pilot then applies full power to the rear pusher propeller and the vehicle starts to move forwards. As it does so, air is forced through the main rotor, spinning it faster and generating more lift. The vehicle climbs into the air, flying as an autogyro.

=== Cruising ===
Once the CarterCopter gets up to a forward speed of about 90 miles per hour (140 km/h), its stubby, lightweight wings provide most of the lift. The pilot can then flatten the angle of attack of the main rotor so it produces very little lift, dramatically reducing the amount of induced drag created by the rotor. Although the rotor is unused at high speed, the rotor is kept spinning at about 80 RPM as the rotation keeps the rotor stretched, preventing excessive flapping.

Normally a helicopter or gyrocopter cannot fly forward at the same speed as or faster than its rotor tip speed. This is because the low airspeed of the retreating rotor blade would cause retreating blade stall, whilst the advancing rotor blade would be traveling at twice the speed of the aircraft, producing uncontrollable flight due to dissymmetry of lift.

However, with the CarterCopter, the fixed wings provide the lift required to remain aloft. Since the rotor is unloaded, the aerodynamic forces on the rotor are very minor. This means that a CarterCopter can theoretically fly much faster than the tip speed of the rotor. The rotors would still experience flapping as they rotate due to dissymmetry of lift between the two sides of the vehicle, but Carter Aviation claims this is manageable.

The claimed theoretical maximum speed of a CarterCopter type aircraft is around 500 mph (800 km/h), which would be about twice as fast as the helicopter flight airspeed record.

=== Achievements ===
External image
- Diagram and formula of μ (Mu)

The prototype's engine was normally aspirated, and hence limited to just 320 hp (240 kW) and the aircraft went about 173 mph (270 km/h); which is still ~40% faster than a conventional autogyro but slower than gyrodynes of the 1950s. A custom gyroplane can go 168.29 km/h (104.6 mph), and Carter says the Carter Personal Air Vehicle goes 200 miles per hour (170 kn; 320 km/h).

At 4,000 lbs weight, the CCTD can climb 750 fpm.

From 1999 to 2001 there were 4 recorded instances of non-fatal crashes, while Carter claims 10 accidents over 7 years, all non-fatal.

Test pilot Larry Neal claimed that the CarterCopter is a challenge to fly because it is a combination of helicopter, autogyro and fixed-wing aircraft.

The CarterCopter achieved its maximum mu (mu is the ratio of airspeed to rotor tip speed) of 1.0 for a brief moment on June 17, 2005, the first time any rotary aircraft has reached this level. CarterCopter's pilot claimed that there was no great drama, and mu 1 was reached accidentally due to normal variations in rotor RPM (at 107 rpm) and vehicle airspeed; the pilot described it as 'smooth' with no significant vibration. The tests were performed under a US Army contract. Carter says they repeated mu-1 with the PAV in 2013.

However, on the next test flight the same day in 2005, the CarterCopter made a hard landing (crashed), causing significant damage, but the pilots were unhurt. The crash was caused by failing propeller bolts which damaged wires controlling the rotor. The propeller was designed by Carter, and was an 8 ft scimitar controllable-pitch propeller weighing 15 lbs and had a thrust of 1850 lbf. It was initially believed that the CarterCopter was unrepairable; later inspection showed that it could be repaired, but the company chose to work on a small open wingless autogyro demonstrator instead. Also later in 2005 and using lessons learned from the CarterCopter, design began on the subsequent compound aircraft, the Carter PAV, which flew in 2011.

The company claims that the testing indicated that the vehicle architecture could potentially outperform helicopters on every dimension except sustained hover, and should be much cheaper to buy and maintain. The company also claims that it also very nearly matches the L/D of fixed wing General Aviation aeroplanes at cruise speed - but with near-vertical takeoff and landing. However, jump take-off ability using the stored rotor energy has never been shown to more than about 16 feet with the wing attached.

NASA has made computer models of the CarterCopter rotor above mu=1 and up to 400 knots airspeed.

== Specifications ==
Data from Aviation Week, American Helicopter Society, AeroNews, Jane's, CarterCopters.com

General characteristics

- Capacity: 5 including flight crew
- Wingspan: 32 ft (9.8 m)
- Aspect ratio: 13.4
- Airfoil: NACA 65 series
- Empty weight: 2,000 lb (907 kg)
- Max takeoff weight: 4,200 lb (1,905 kg)
- Fuel capacity: 800 lb (363 kg)
- Powerplant: 1 × GM V-6 crate engine, 350 hp (260 kW) for take-off
- Main rotor diameter: 32 ft (9.8 m)
- Main rotor area: 804.35 sq ft (74.727 m^{2})
- Propellers: 2-bladed Carter scimitar controllable-pitch propeller, 8 ft (2.4 m) diameter

Performance

- Cruise speed: 120 kn (140 mph, 230 km/h) at sea level

projected: 400 mph (644 km/h) at 50,000 ft (15,240 m)

- Range: 2,200 nmi (2,500 mi, 4,000 km) with reserve, 800 lb (363 kg) fuel load

1,000 mi (1,609 km) with reserve, 400 lb (181 kg) fuel load

- Service ceiling: 10,000 ft (3,000 m)
- Lift-to-drag: 7 at 170 mph (274 km/h)

== See also ==
- Sikorsky S-72 - compound helicopter with rigid stoppable rotor
- McCulloch J-2 - an autogyro with clutched rotor
- McDonnell XV-1

Related development

- Carter PAV

Aircraft of comparable role, configuration, and era

- Sikorsky X2
