= Ceiling (aeronautics) =

Maximum altitude an aircraft can reach

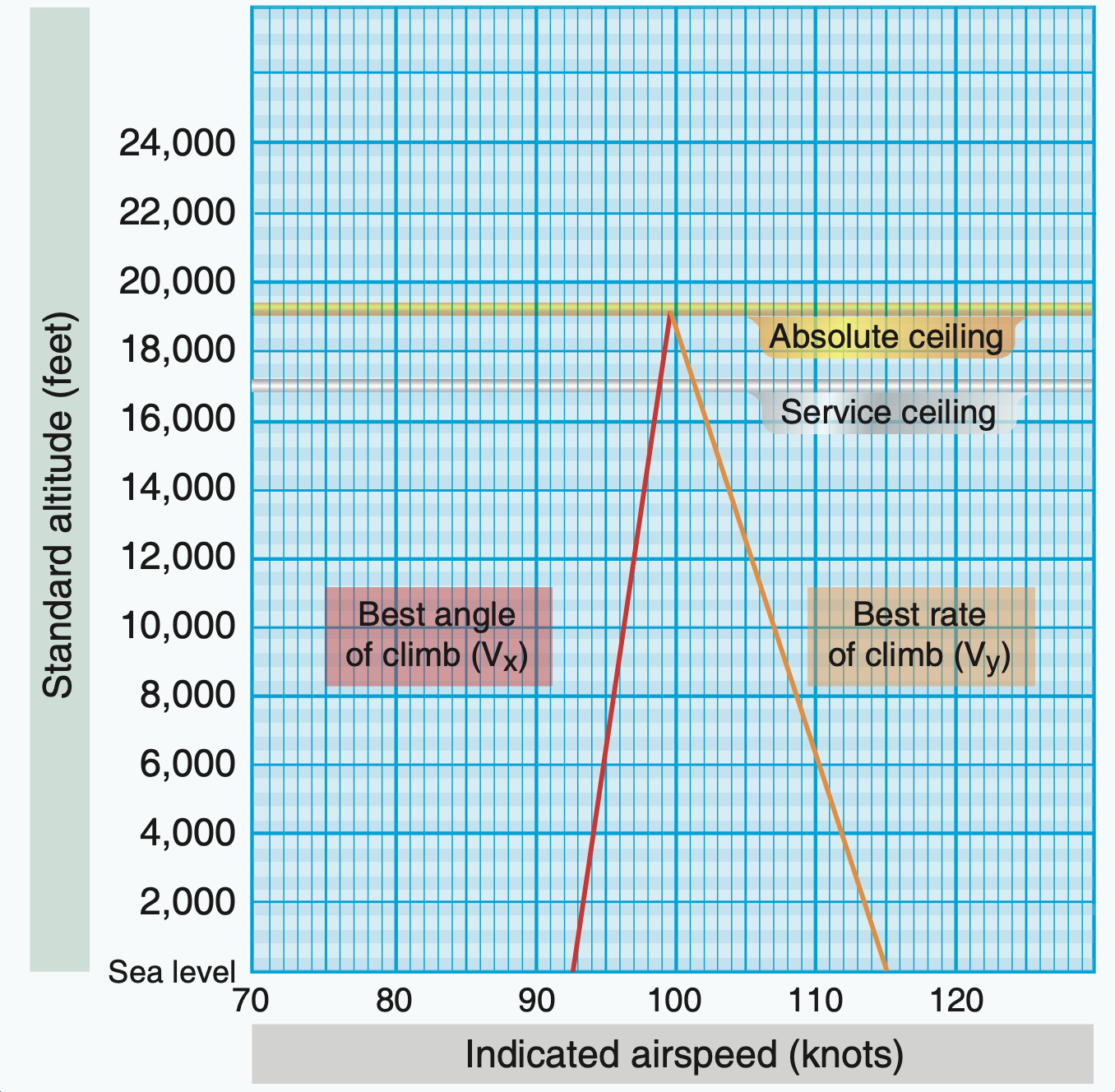
The absolute ceiling and service ceiling diagram of an aircraft

With respect to aircraft performance, a ceiling is the maximum density altitude an aircraft can reach under a set of conditions, as determined by its flight envelope.

== Service ceiling ==
Service ceiling is the density altitude at which the rate of climb drops below a prescribed value.

The service ceiling is the maximum altitude of an aircraft during normal operations. Specifically, it is the density altitude at which flying in a clean configuration, at the best rate of climb airspeed for that altitude and with all engines operating and producing maximum continuous power, will produce a given rate of climb. A typical value might be 100 ft/min (0.51 m/s) climb, or on the order of 500 ft/min (2.5 m/s) climb for jet aircraft.

The one-engine inoperative (OEI) service ceiling of a twin-engine, fixed-wing aircraft is the density altitude at which flying in a clean configuration, at the best rate of climb airspeed for that altitude with one engine producing maximum continuous power and the other engine shut down (and if it has a propeller, the propeller is feathered), will produce a given rate of climb, usually 50 ft/min (0.25 m/s).

However, some performance charts will define the service ceiling as the pressure altitude at which the aircraft will have the capability of climbing at 50 ft/min (0.25 m/s) with one propeller feathered.

Most commercial jetliners have a service (or certified) ceiling of under 45,000 ft (13,700 m) and some business jets about 51,000 ft (15.5 km; 9.7 mi). Before its retirement, the Concorde supersonic transport (SST) (as well as the Tupolev Tu-144 before it was retired) routinely flew at 60,000 ft (18.3 km; 11.4 mi).

== Absolute ceiling ==
The absolute ceiling is the highest altitude at which an aircraft can sustain level flight. Due to the thin air at higher altitudes, a much higher true airspeed (TAS) is required to generate sufficient lift on the wings. The absolute ceiling is therefore the altitude at which the engines are operating at maximum thrust, yet can only generate enough lift to match the weight of the aircraft. Hence, the aircraft will not have any excess capacity to climb further. Stated technically, it is the altitude where the maximum sustained (with no decreasing airspeed) rate of climb is zero.

Compared to service ceiling, the absolute ceiling of commercial aircraft is much higher than for standard operational purposes. In the Concorde's case, it was tested to be 68,000 ft (21 km; 12.9 mi). It is impossible to reach for most (because of the vertical speed asymptotically approaching zero) without afterburners or other devices temporarily increasing thrust. Another factor that makes it impossible for some aircraft to reach their absolute ceiling, even with temporary increases in thrust, is the aircraft reaching the "coffin corner". Flight at the absolute ceiling is also not economically advantageous due to the low indicated airspeed which can be sustained: although the true airspeed at an altitude is typically greater than indicated airspeed (IAS), the difference is not enough to compensate for the fact that IAS at which minimum drag is achieved is usually low, so a flight at an absolute ceiling altitude results in a low TAS as well, and therefore in a high fuel burn rate per distance traveled. The absolute ceiling varies with the air temperature and, overall, the aircraft weight (usually calculated at MTOW).

== See also ==
- Aerodynamic ceiling
