= LTE =

LTE may refer to:

== Science and technology ==
- LTE (telecommunication) (Long-Term Evolution), a mobile telephony standard
  - LTE Advanced, an enhancement
  - LTE Advanced Pro, a further enhancement
- Compaq LTE, a line of laptop computers
- Leukotriene, a family of inflammatory mediators
- Lifting-the-exponent lemma, a mathematical result in number theory
- Local thermodynamic equilibrium, in physics

== Transport ==
- LTE International Airways, a 1987–2008 Spanish charter airline
- Lam Tei stop (MTR station code), Hong Kong
- London Transport Executive, the 1948–1962 organisation responsible for public transport in Greater London
- London Transport Executive (GLC), the 1970–1984 public transport executive agency within the Greater London Council
- Loss of tail-rotor effectiveness, an event in helicopter flight

== Other uses ==
- Letter to the editor, in periodicals
- Liquid Tension Experiment, a progressive metal supergroup
- London Tests of English, former name of PTE General, an English exam
- Low-tide elevation, a piece of land which is submerged at high tide
