= Coffin corner (aerodynamics) =

Dangerous condition in aviation

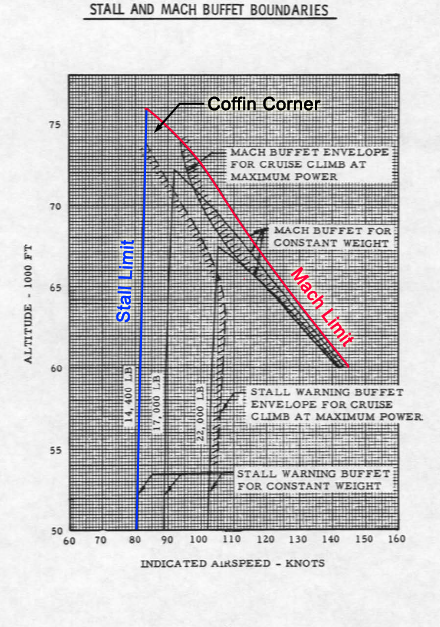
Graph of altitude/speed region envelope for Lockheed U-2 depicting coffin corner

Coffin corner (also known as the aerodynamic ceiling or Q corner) is a high-altitude restriction in allowable speed range. The high limit for Mach buffet and low limit for stall buffet are so close together during steady flight that exceeding the limits, as a result of turning maneuvers or clear air turbulence, may cause loss of control of the aircraft.

== Aerodynamic basis ==
Consideration of statics shows that when a fixed-wing aircraft is in straight, level flight at constant airspeed, the lift on the main wing plus the force (in the negative sense if downward) on the horizontal stabilizer is equal to the aircraft's weight and its thrust is equal to its drag. In most circumstances this equilibrium can occur at a range of airspeeds. The minimum such speed is the stall speed, or V_{SO}. The indicated airspeed at which a fixed-wing aircraft stalls varies with the weight of the aircraft but does not vary significantly with altitude. At speeds close to the stall speed the aircraft's wings are at a high angle of attack.

At higher altitudes, the air density is lower than at sea level. Because of the progressive reduction in air density, as the aircraft's altitude increases, its true airspeed is progressively greater than its indicated airspeed. For example, the indicated airspeed at which an aircraft stalls can be considered constant, but the true airspeed at which it stalls increases with altitude.

Air conducts sound at a certain speed, which becomes slower as the air becomes cooler. Because the temperature of the atmosphere generally decreases with altitude (until the tropopause), the speed of sound also decreases with altitude.

A given true airspeed, divided by the speed of sound in that air, gives a ratio known as the Mach number. A Mach number of 1.0 indicates an airspeed equal to the speed of sound in that air. Because the speed of sound increases with air temperature, and air temperature generally decreases with altitude, the true airspeed for a given Mach number generally decreases with altitude.

The flight envelope is a plot of various curves representing the limits of the aircraft's true airspeed and altitude. Generally, the top-left boundary of the envelope is the curve representing stall speed, which increases as altitude increases. The top-right boundary of the envelope is the curve representing critical Mach number in true airspeed terms, which decreases as altitude increases. These curves typically intersect at some altitude higher than the maximum permitted altitude for the aircraft. This intersection is the coffin corner, or more formally the Q corner.

The above explanation is based on level, constant speed, flight with a given gross weight and load factor of 1.0 G. The specific altitudes and speeds of the coffin corner will differ depending on weight, and the load factor increases caused by banking and pitching maneuvers. Similarly, the specific altitudes at which the stall speed meets the critical Mach number will differ depending on the actual atmospheric temperature.

== Consequences ==
When an aircraft slows to below its stall speed, it is unable to generate enough lift to overcome aircraft weight. This will cause the aircraft to drop in altitude. The drop in altitude may cause the pilot to increase the angle of attack by pulling back on the stick, because normally increasing the angle of attack puts the aircraft in a climb. However, when the wing exceeds its critical angle of attack, an increase in angle of attack will lead to a loss of lift and a further loss of airspeed – the wing stalls. The wing stalls when it exceeds its critical angle of attack because the airflow over the top of the wing separates.

When the airplane exceeds its critical Mach number (such as during stall prevention or recovery), then drag increases or Mach tuck occurs, which can cause the aircraft to upset, lose control, and lose altitude. In either case, as the airplane falls, it could gain speed and then structural failure could occur, typically due to excessive g-forces during the pullout phase of the recovery.

As an airplane approaches its coffin corner, the margin between stall speed and critical Mach number becomes smaller and smaller. Small changes could put one wing or the other above or below the limits. For instance, a turn causes the inner wing to have a lower airspeed, and the outer wing, a higher airspeed. The aircraft could exceed both limits at once. Or, turbulence could cause the airspeed to change suddenly, to beyond the limits. Some aircraft, such as the Lockheed U-2, routinely operate in the coffin corner. In the case of the U-2, the aircraft was equipped with an autopilot, though it was unreliable. The U-2's speed margin, at high altitude, between 1-g stall warning buffet and Mach buffet can be as small as 5 knots.

Aircraft capable of flying close to their critical Mach number usually carry a machmeter, an instrument which indicates speed in Mach number terms. As part of certifying aircraft in the United States, the Federal Aviation Administration (FAA) certifies a maximum operational velocity in terms of Mach number, or M_{MO}.

Following a series of crashes of high-performance aircraft operating at high altitudes to which no definite cause could be attributed, as the aircraft involved suffered near total destruction, the FAA published an Advisory Circular establishing guidelines for improved aircrew training in high altitude operations in high performance aircraft. The circular includes a comprehensive explanation of aerodynamic effects of and operations near coffin corner.

Due to the effects of greater Mach number at high-altitude flight, the expected flight characteristics of a given configuration can change significantly. This was pointed out by a report describing the effect of ice crystals on pitot-tube airspeed indications at high altitude:

... the [angle of attack] AOA for buffet onset is considerably less than the stall AOA at low altitudes. For example, a flight test project conducted by the National Research Council of Canada titled "Aerodynamic Low-Speed Buffet Boundary Characteristics of a High-Speed Business Jet" and presented at the 24th International Congress of the Aeronautical Sciences involved an intermediate capacity, high-speed business jet with highly swept wings to conduct low-speed buffet testing. At an altitude of approximately 13,000 ft., the buffet onset AOA occurred at 16.84 deg. In contrast, in straight and level flight at FL 450 the buffet onset AOA was 6.95 deg. In other words, be wary of your pitch attitude while at high altitudes because of the limited range of AOA due to Mach effects.

== See also ==
- Height–velocity diagram for helicopters
