= Autorotation =

Rotation of helicopter rotors by action of wind resistance rather than engine power

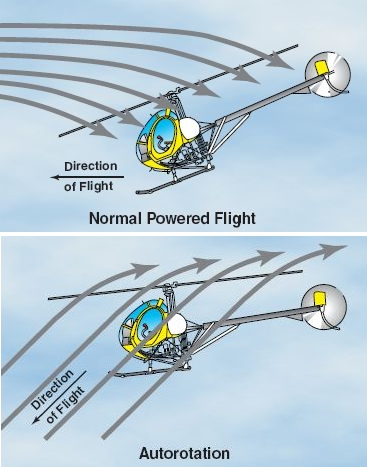
Airflow through a helicopter rotor. Above, the rotor is powered and pushing air downward, generating lift and thrust. Below, the helicopter rotor has lost power, and the craft is making an emergency landing.

Autorotation is a state of flight in which the main rotor system of a helicopter or other rotary-wing aircraft turns by the action of air moving up through the rotor, as with an autogyro, rather than engine power driving the rotor. The term autorotation dates to a period of early helicopter development between 1915 and 1920, and refers to the rotors turning without the engine. It is analogous to the gliding flight of a fixed-wing aircraft.

The most common use of autorotation in helicopters is to safely land the aircraft in the event of an engine failure or tail-rotor failure. It is a common emergency procedure taught to helicopter pilots as part of their training.

In normal powered helicopter flight, air is drawn into the main rotor system from above and forced downward, but during autorotation, air moves into the rotor system from below as the helicopter descends. Autorotation is permitted mechanically because of both a freewheeling unit, which allows the main rotor to continue turning even if the engine is not running, as well as aerodynamic forces of relative wind maintaining rotor speed. It is the means by which a helicopter can land safely in the event of complete engine failure or other mechanical issue which disconnects the engine from the rotor system. Consequently, all single-engine helicopters must demonstrate this capability to obtain a type certificate.

The longest helicopter autorotation in history was performed by Jean Boulet in 1972 when he reached a record altitude of 12,440 m (40,814 ft) in an Aérospatiale SA 315B Lama. Because of a −63 °C (−81.4 °F) temperature at that altitude, as soon as he reduced power, the engine flamed out and could not be restarted. By using autorotation he was able to land the aircraft safely. Autorotation is the normal operating mode of autogyros; the distance record (FAI Class E-3.b, Group I piston-engine autogyro) is 1,653 km (1,027 mi), set on 10 November 2015 by Paul Salmon in a Magni M22 gyroplane on a non-stop flight from El Paso, Texas to Cape Girardeau, Missouri.

== Descent and landing ==
For a helicopter, "autorotation" refers to the descending maneuver in which the engine is disengaged from the main rotor system and the rotor blades are driven solely by the upward flow of air through the rotor. The freewheeling unit is a special clutch mechanism that disengages any time the engine rotational speed is less than the rotor rotational speed. If the engine fails, the freewheeling unit automatically disengages the engine from the main rotor, allowing the main rotor to rotate freely.

The most common reason for autorotation is an engine malfunction or failure, but autorotation can also be performed in the event of a complete tail rotor failure, or following loss of tail-rotor effectiveness, since there is virtually no torque produced in an autorotation. If altitude permits, autorotations may also be used to recover from a vortex ring state, also known as settling with power. In all cases, a successful landing depends on the helicopter's height and velocity at the commencement of autorotation (see height–velocity diagram).

At the instant of engine failure, the main rotor blades are producing lift and thrust from their angle of attack and velocity. By immediately lowering collective pitch, which must be done in case of an engine failure, the pilot reduces lift and drag and the helicopter begins an immediate descent, producing an upward flow of air through the rotor system. This upward flow of air through the rotor provides sufficient thrust to maintain rotor rotational speed throughout the descent. Since the tail rotor is driven by the main rotor transmission during autorotation, heading control is maintained as in normal flight.

The collective must be immediately lowered to enter autorotation. Any up-collective will cause the blades to generate lift with associated drag. This drag will quickly cause the rotor RPM to decay to an unsafe speed potentially causing the blades to stall. If the blades stall, the subsequent very-high increase in drag will stop the rotor from turning. This is non-recoverable.

Once an autorotation is established, the collective is used to control rotor RPM to keep it below redline and above rotor stall RPM.

Several factors affect the rate of descent in autorotation: density altitude, gross weight, rotor rotational speed, and forward airspeed. The pilot's primary control of the rate of descent is airspeed. Higher or lower airspeeds are obtained with the cyclic pitch control just as in normal flight. Rate of descent is high at zero airspeed and decreases to a minimum at approximately 50 to 90 knots, depending upon the particular helicopter and the factors previously mentioned. As the airspeed increases beyond the speed that gives minimum rate of descent, the rate of descent increases again. Even at zero airspeed, the rotor is quite effective, as it has nearly the drag coefficient of a parachute despite consisting of blades.

When landing from an autorotation, the kinetic energy stored in the rotating blades and the forward movement of the aircraft are used to decrease the rate of descent and make a soft landing. A greater amount of rotor energy is required to stop a helicopter with a high rate of descent than is required to stop a helicopter that is descending more slowly. Therefore, autorotative descents at very low or very high airspeeds are more critical than those performed at the minimum rate of descent airspeed.

An autorotation landing consists of multiple stages: glide, flare, landing. A stable glide at an appropriate speed for the helicopter is maintained during descent. At some altitude above the ground, typically 50–100 feet, the pilot raises the nose and applies up collective. Raising the nose leads to more airflow through the rotor and raising the collective converts this airflow into more rotor lift which will slow the helicopter's forward speed. Raising the collective also keeps the rotor RPM from exceeding redline. Depending on the helicopter, before airspeed has completely decayed, the helicopter is leveled. Most helicopters at this point will still have forward velocity and will perform a run-on landing using the remaining rotor momentum. Some helicopters have enough momentum in the rotor system that the helicopter can be brought to a standstill and lowered to the ground with no forward velocity.

Each type of helicopter has a specific airspeed at which a power-off glide is most efficient. The best airspeed is the one that combines the greatest glide range with the slowest rate of descent. The specific airspeed is different for each type of helicopter, yet certain factors (density altitude, wind) affect all configurations in the same manner. The specific airspeed for autorotations is established for each type of helicopter on the basis of average weather and wind conditions and normal loading.

A helicopter in autorotation can be flown backwards, sideways or vertically with no lateral velocity. A slip can be used to decrease the glide angle.

A helicopter operated with heavy loads in high density altitude or gusty wind conditions can achieve best performance from a slightly increased airspeed in the descent. At low density altitude and light loading, best performance is achieved from a slight decrease in normal airspeed. Following this general procedure of fitting airspeed to existing conditions, the pilot can achieve approximately the same glide angle in any set of circumstances and estimate the touchdown point. This optimum glide angle is usually 17–20 degrees.

=== Autorotational regions ===
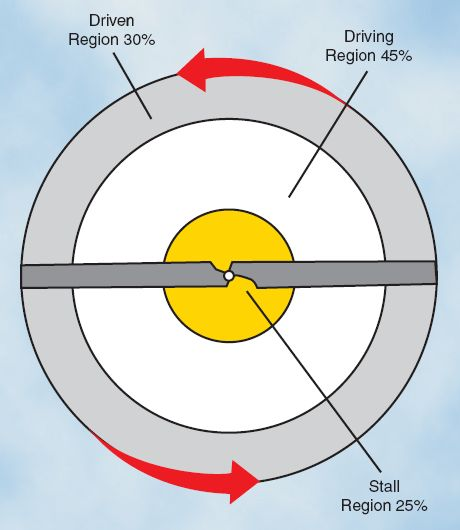
Blade regions in vertical autorotation descent

During vertical autorotation, the rotor disc is divided into three regions—the driven region, the driving region, and the stall region. The sizes of these regions vary with the blade pitch, rate of descent, and rotor rotational speed. When changing autorotative rotational speed, blade pitch, or rate of descent, the sizes of the regions change in relation to each other.

The driven region, also called the propeller region, is the region at the end of the blades. Normally, it consists of about 30 percent of the radius. It is the driven region that produces the most drag. The overall result is a deceleration in the rotation of the blade.

The driving region, or autorotative region, normally lies between 25 and 70 percent of the blade radius, which produces the forces needed to turn the blades during autorotation. Total aerodynamic force in the driving region is inclined slightly forward of the axis of rotation, producing a continual acceleration force. This inclination supplies thrust, which tends to accelerate the rotation of the blade. Driving region size varies with blade pitch setting, rate of descent, and rotor rotational speed.

The inner 25 percent of the rotor blade is referred to as the stall region and operates above its maximum angle of attack (stall angle) causing drag, which slows rotation of the blade. A constant rotor rotational speed is achieved by adjusting the collective pitch so blade acceleration forces from the driving region are balanced with the deceleration forces from the driven and stall regions.

By controlling the size of the driving region, the pilot can adjust autorotative rotational speed. For example, if the collective pitch is raised, the pitch angle increases in all regions. This causes the point of equilibrium to move inboard along the blade's span, thereby increasing the size of the driven region. The stall region also becomes larger while the driving region becomes smaller. Reducing the size of the driving region causes the acceleration force of the driving region and rotational speed to decrease.

== Broken Wing Award ==
The Broken Wing Award is a United States Army award for successful execution of an autorotation under emergency conditions. The requirements for the award, as stated in Army Regulation 672-74, are, "An aircrew member must, through outstanding airmanship, minimize or prevent aircraft damage or injury to personnel during an emergency situation. The aircrew member must have shown extraordinary skill while recovering an aircraft from an in-flight emergency situation."

== Notable occurrences ==
While autorotation is a standard emergency maneuver taught to all rotary-wing pilots, the outcome of a forced landing depends heavily on altitude, airspeed, rotor inertia, and pilot response time.

=== Successful autorotations ===
- 21 June 1972 – Jean Boulet set a world altitude record for helicopters in an Aérospatiale SA 315B Lama, reaching 12,440 m (40,810 ft). At peak altitude, the engine flamed out due to extreme low temperatures and could not be restarted. Boulet successfully autorotated the aircraft down from over 40,000 feet to a safe landing on the ground, setting the record for the highest unpowered autorotation in aviation history.
- 24 May 2000 – A Eurocopter AS350 operating as a news helicopter for Philadelphia's KYW-TV suffered an engine failure at an altitude of approximately 800 ft (240 m) directly over a suburban area. The pilot successfully autorotated into a small grassy area near a highway interchange, avoiding nearby homes and commercial buildings. Although the aircraft sustained substantial damage during the hard touchdown, both crew members survived without life-threatening injuries.

=== Unsuccessful autorotations ===
- 8 September 2017 – A Schweizer 269C carrying country music singer Troy Gentry crashed in Medford, New Jersey, during a pleasure flight prior to a scheduled Montgomery Gentry concert. Following a mechanical disconnection of the throttle control linkage in flight, the pilot intentionally shut down the engine to attempt an autorotative landing. The pilot entered the autorotation prematurely while distant from the runway and subsequently pulled collective pitch in an effort to extend the glide. This action decayed the main rotor RPM below critical recovery limits, leading to an uncontrolled descent into a wooded area that killed both occupants.
- 8 September 2020 – A Robinson R44 experienced a sudden engine power loss near Telemark, Norway, at an altitude of approximately 800 ft (240 m) due to an engine mechanical issue. Because the R44 utilizes a low-inertia rotor system, rotor RPM decayed below critical autorotative levels before the maneuver could be successfully executed. The aircraft descended rapidly into a pine forest; while the tree canopy cushioned the final impact and prevented fatalities, the autorotation itself failed to arrest the descent rate.

== See also ==
- Autogyro
- Helicopter flight controls
- Helicopter height–velocity diagram
