= Tail rotor =

Rotor mounted on the tail of a helicopter

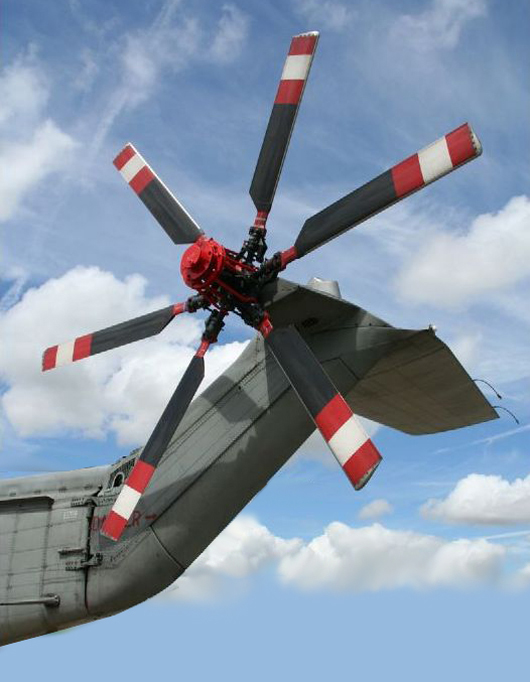
Traditional tail rotor of an Sikorsky S-61

The tail rotor is a smaller rotor mounted vertically or near-vertically at the tail of a traditional single-rotor helicopter, where it rotates to generate a propeller-like horizontal thrust in the same direction as the main rotor's rotation. The tail rotor's position and distance from the helicopter's center of mass allow it to develop enough thrust leverage to counter the reactional torque exerted on the fuselage by the spinning of the main rotor. Without the tail rotor or other anti-torque mechanisms (e.g. NOTAR), the helicopter would be constantly spinning in the opposite direction of the main rotor when flying.

Tail rotors are simpler than main rotors since they require only collective changes in pitch to vary thrust. The pitch of the tail rotor blades is adjustable by the pilot via the anti-torque pedals, which also provide directional control by allowing the pilot to rotate the helicopter around its vertical axis. Its drive system consists of a shaft powered from the main transmission and a gearbox mounted at the end of the tail boom. The drive shaft may consist of one long shaft or a series of shorter shafts connected at both ends with flexible couplings, that allow the drive shaft to flex with the tail boom. The gearbox at the end of the tail boom provides an angled drive for the tail rotor and may also include gearing to adjust the output to the optimum rotational speed for the tail rotor, measured in rotations per minute (RPM). On larger helicopters with a tail pylon, intermediate gearboxes are used to transition the tail rotor drive shaft from along the tailboom to the top of the pylon. The tail rotor pylon may also serve as a vertical stabilizing airfoil, to alleviate the power requirement for the tail rotor in forward flight. The tail rotor pylon may also serve to provide limited antitorque within certain airspeed ranges, in the event that the tail rotor or its flight controls fail. About 10% of the engine power goes to the tail rotor.

== Design ==
The tail rotor system rotates airfoils, small wings called blades, that vary in pitch in order to vary the amount of thrust they produce. The blades most often utilize a composite material construction, such as a core made of aluminum honeycomb or plasticized paper honeycomb, covered in a skin made of aluminum or carbon fiber composite. Tail rotor blades can be made with both symmetrical and asymmetrical airfoil construction. The pitch change mechanism uses a cable control system or control tubes that run from the anti-torque pedals in the cockpit to a mechanism mounted on the tail rotor gearbox. In larger helicopters, the pitch change mechanism is augmented by a hydraulic power control servo. In the event of a hydraulic system failure, the mechanical system is still able to control the tail rotor pitch, though the control resistance felt by the pilot will be considerably greater.

The tail rotor is powered by the helicopter's main power plant, and rotates at a speed proportional to that of the main rotor. In both piston and turbine powered helicopters, the main rotor and the tail rotor are mechanically connected through a freewheeling clutch system, which allows the rotors to keep turning in the event of an engine failure by mechanically de-linking the engine from both the main and tail rotors. During autorotation, the momentum of the main rotor continues to power the tail rotor and allow directional control. To optimize its function for forward flight, the blades of a tail rotor have no twist to reduce the profile drag, because the tail rotor is mounted with its axis of rotation perpendicular to the direction of flight.

== Reliability and safety ==
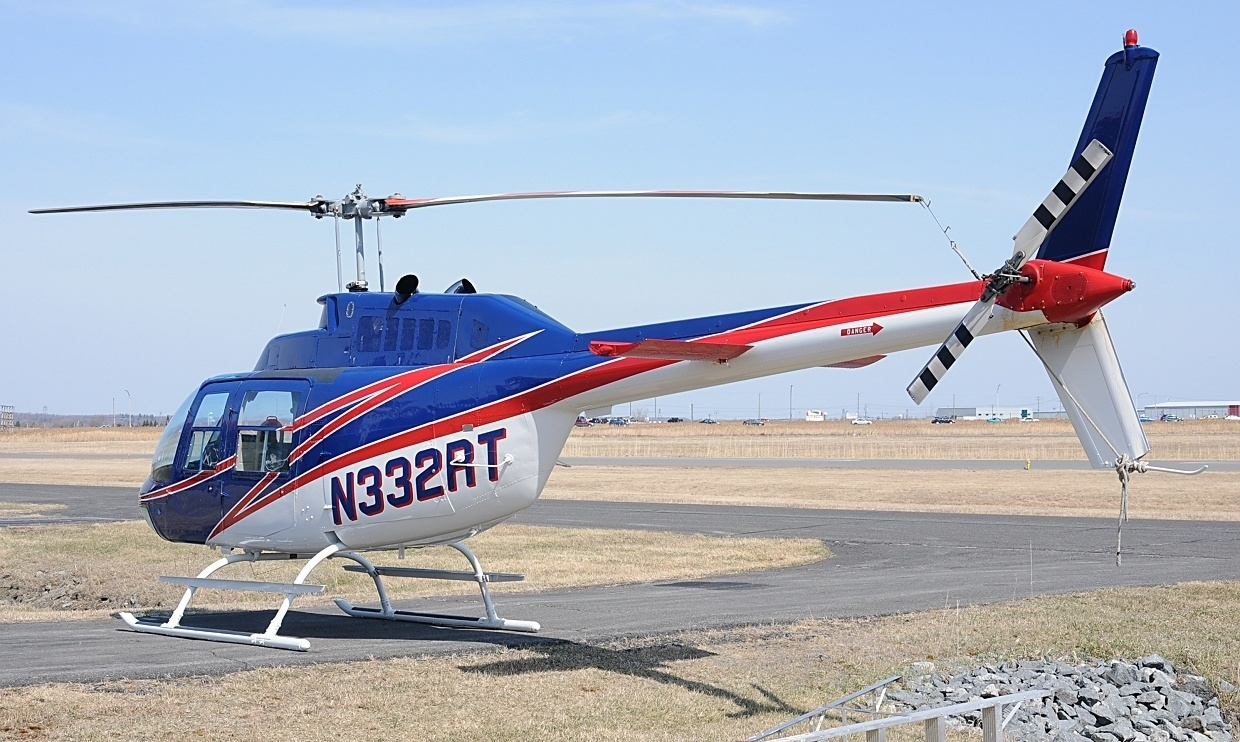
The tail rotor of a Bell 206 protected from ground strikes by a skid plate

The tail rotor and the systems that provide power and control for it are considered critically important for safe flight. As with many parts on a helicopter, the tail rotor, its transmission, and many parts in the drive system are often life-limited, meaning they are arbitrarily replaced after a certain number of flight hours, regardless of condition. Between replacements, parts are subject to frequent inspections utilizing visual as well as chemical methods such as fluorescent penetrant inspection to detect weak parts before they fail completely.

Despite the emphasis on reducing failures, they do occasionally occur, most often due to hard landings and tailstrikes, or foreign object damage. Though the tail rotor is considered essential for safe flight, the loss of tail rotor function does not necessarily result in a fatal crash. In cases where the failure occurs due to contact with the ground, the aircraft is already at low altitude, so the pilot may be able to reduce collective pitch of the main rotor and land the helicopter before it spins completely out of control. Should the tail rotor fail randomly during cruise flight, forward momentum will often provide some directional stability, as many helicopters are equipped with a vertical stabilizer. The pilot would then be forced to autorotate and make an emergency landing with significant forward airspeed, which is known as a running landing or roll-on landing.

The tail rotor itself is a hazard to ground crews working near a running helicopter. For this reason, tail rotors are painted with stripes of alternating colors to increase their visibility to ground crews while the tail rotor is spinning.

== Alternative technologies ==
There have been three major alternative designs which attempt to solve the shortcomings of the tail rotor system.

The first is to use an enclosured ducted fan rather than openly exposed rotor blades. This design is referred to as a fantail or "Fenestron", a trademark of Eurocopter (now Airbus Helicopters) for its Dauphin-series utility helicopters. The enclosure around the fan reduces tip vortex losses, shields the blades from foreign object damage, protects ground crews from potential hazard of an openly spinning rotor, and produces a much quieter and less turbulent noise profile than a conventional tail rotor. The ducted fan uses more numerous shorter blades, but otherwise works in very similar thrust principles to a conventional tail rotor.

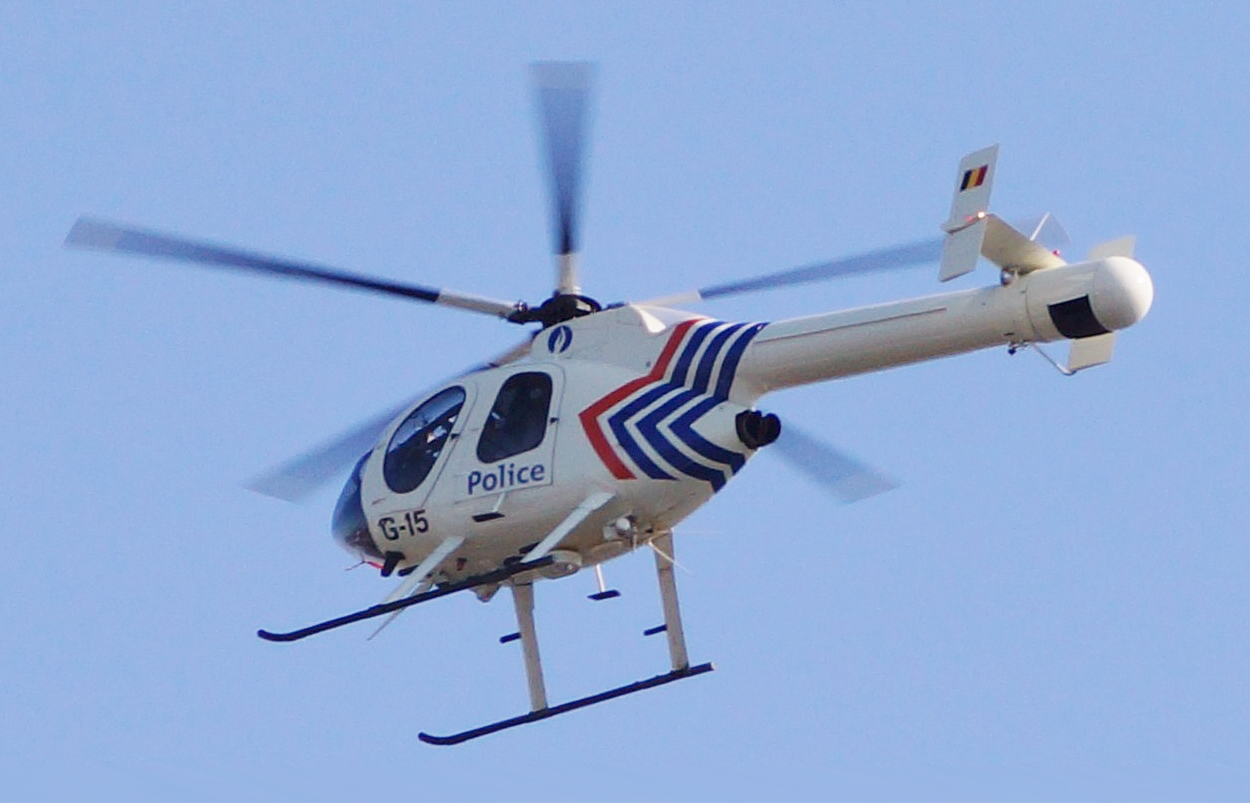
MD Helicopters 520N NOTAR

McDonnell Douglas developed the NOTAR (NO TAil Rotor) system, which eliminates having any rotating parts out in the open. The NOTAR system uses a variable pitch ducted fan driven by the helicopter's powerplant, but the ducted fan is mounted inside the fuselage ahead of the tail boom, and the exhaust passes through the tail boom to the end, where it is expelled out one side. This creates a boundary layer which causes the downwash from the main rotor to hug the tail boom according to the Coandă effect. This creates a force which cancels out the main rotor torque and provides directional control. The advantages of the system are similar to the Fenestron system discussed above.

There are at least four ways to eliminate the necessity of a tail rotor altogether :

- Tandem/transverse rotors: to use two non-overlapping main rotors which rotate in opposite directions, so that the torque created by one rotor cancels out the torque created by the other. Such configurations are commonly seen on heavy-lift helicopters like the tandem-rotored CH-47 Chinook.

The tiltrotor design, as seen on the V-22 Osprey, is a variation of the transverse rotor design, where the rotors are installed in tiltable nacelles at the ends of fixed wings. This allows the rotors to serve instead as propellers when flying forward at full speed.

- Coaxial. Other designs such as the Kamov Ka-50 and Sikorsky X2 use coaxial counter-rotating main rotors, which means that both rotors spin around the same axis but in opposite directions. The complexity of any dual main rotor system almost invariably requires the addition of a fly-by-wire flight control system, which increases costs drastically.
- Intermeshing rotors also turn in opposite directions, but the blades rotate into the gaps between the opposing blades so the rotors can intersect each other's path without colliding. Invented by Anton Flettner and used in Flettner Fl 282, Kaman HH-43 Huskie, and Kaman K-MAX.
- Tip jet. Another way to eliminate the effect of torque created by the rotorwing is by mounting the engine on the tips of the rotorwing rather than inside the helicopter itself; this is called a tip jet. One example of a helicopter using such a system is the NHI H-3 Kolibrie, which had a ramjet on each of the two wingtips, and an auxiliary power unit to spin up the rotor before starting the ramjets. Another example would be the Fairey Rotodyne. Also, unpowered rotors used in autogyro, gyrodyne, and derived concepts do not need a tail rotor either, although nearly all models that utilize this concept of propulsion do need a second propeller in one way or another to drive them forward to begin with.

== See also ==
- Loss of tail-rotor effectiveness
- Piasecki X-49
