= Clean configuration =

Aeronautics term

Clean configuration is the flight configuration of a fixed-wing aircraft when its external equipment is retracted to minimize drag, and thus maximize airspeed for a given power setting.

For most airplanes, clean configuration means simply that the wing flaps and landing gear are retracted, as these are the cause of drag due to the lack of streamlined shape. On more complex airplanes, it also means that other devices on the wings (such as slats, spoilers, and leading edge flaps) are retracted. Clean configuration is used for normal cruising at altitude during which lift, or rise in altitude, is not needed.

In military aviation, a clean configuration is generally without external stores which reduce maximum performance both due to increased weight and even more so due to increased drag.
