= Lifting-the-exponent lemma =

Result in elementary number theory

In elementary number theory, the lifting-the-exponent lemma provides several formulas for computing the p-adic valuation $\nu_p$ of binomial expressions which are differences of powers of integers: that is, how many factors of a prime $p$ are present. The lemma describes the steps necessary to "lift" the exponent of $p$ in such expressions. It is related to Hensel's lemma. It is often used in mathematical olympiads.

== History ==
By 1878, some ideas in the lemma had appeared in the work of mathematician Édouard Lucas, who was then a professor at Lycée Charlemagne. Lucas described related divisibility results (with a minor error in the case $p = 2$).

In 2006, Romanian mathematician Mihai Manea first published the modern and systematic formulation of the lemma, especially in the context of olympiad mathematics.

By 2011, the lemma had become well-known in the math olympiad folklore, particularly through its use on mathematics forums such as the Art of Problem Solving.

== Statements ==
For a prime number $p$, let $\nu_p(x) = k$, where $p^k$ is the highest power of $p$ which is a divisor of $x$, so that $p^k \mid x, \ \ p^{k+1}\nmid x$. For any integers $x$ and $y$ with $p \nmid x$ and $p \nmid y$, and a positive integer $n$, the following statements hold:

- When $p$ is odd:
  - If $p \mid x-y$, then $\nu_p(x^n-y^n) = \nu_p(x-y)+\nu_p(n)$.
  - If $p \mid x+y$ and $n$ is odd, then $\nu_p(x^n+y^n) = \nu_p(x+y)+\nu_p(n)$.
  - If $p \mid x+y$ and $n$ is even, then $\nu_p(x^n+y^n) = 0$.
- When $p = 2$:
  - If $2 \mid x-y$ and $n$ is even, then $\nu_2(x^n-y^n) = \nu_2(x-y)+\nu_2(x+y)+\nu_2(n)-1 = \nu_2\!\left(\frac{x^2-y^2}{2}\right)+\nu_2(n)$.
  - If $2 \mid x-y$ and $n$ is odd, then $\nu_2(x^n-y^n) = \nu_2(x-y)$. (Follows from the general case below.)
  - Corollaries:
    - If $4 \mid x-y$, and if both $x$ and $y$ are odd, then $\nu_2(x+y)=1$ and thus $\nu_2(x^n-y^n) = \nu_2(x-y)+\nu_2(n)$.
    - If $2 \mid x+y$ and $n$ is even, then $\nu_2(x^n+y^n) = 1$.
    - If $2 \mid x+y$ and $n$ is odd, then $\nu_2(x^n+y^n) = \nu_2(x+y)$.
- For all $p$:
  - If $p \mid x-y$ and $p \nmid n$, then $\nu_p(x^n-y^n) = \nu_p(x-y)$.
  - If $p \mid x+y$, $p \nmid n$ and $n$ is odd, then $\nu_p(x^n+y^n) = \nu_p(x+y)$.

== Generalizations ==
The lifting-the-exponent lemma has been generalized to complex values of $x, y$ provided that the value of $\tfrac{x^n-y^n}{x-y}$ is an integer.

== Proof outline ==
=== Base case ===
The base case $\nu_p(x^n-y^n) = \nu_p(x-y)$ when $p \nmid n$ is proven first. Because $p \mid x-y \iff x \equiv y \pmod{p}$,

$x^{n-1}+x^{n-2}y+x^{n-3}y^2+\dots+y^{n-1} \equiv nx^{n-1} \not\equiv 0 \pmod{p}$	1

The fact that $x^n-y^n = (x-y)(x^{n-1}+x^{n-2}y+x^{n-3}y^2+\dots+y^{n-1})$ completes the proof. The condition $\nu_p(x^n+y^n) = \nu_p(x+y)$ for odd $n$ is similar, where we observe that the proof above holds for integers $x$ and $y$, and therefore we can substitute $-y$ for $y$ above to obtain the desired result.

=== General case (odd p) ===
Via the binomial expansion, the substitution $y = x+kp$ can be used in (1) to show that $\nu_p(x^p-y^p) = \nu_p(x-y)+1$ because the quantity in (1) is a multiple of $p$ but not $p^2$. Likewise, $\nu_p(x^p+y^p) = \nu_p(x+y)+1$.

Then, if $n$ is written as $p^ab$ where $p \nmid b$, the base case gives $\nu_p(x^n-y^n) = \nu_p((x^{p^a})^b-(y^{p^a})^b) = \nu_p(x^{p^a}-y^{p^a})$. By induction on $a$,

$$\begin{align}
\nu_p(x^{p^a}-y^{p^a}) &= \nu_p(((\dots(x^p)^p\dots))^p-((\dots(y^p)^p\dots))^p)\ \text{(exponentiation used } a \text{ times per term)} \\
&= \nu_p(x-y)+a
\end{align}$$

A similar argument can be applied for $\nu_p(x^n+y^n)$.

=== General case (p = 2) ===
The proof for the odd $p$ case cannot be directly applied when $p = 2$ because the binomial coefficient $\binom{p}{2} = \frac{p(p-1)}{2}$ is only an integral multiple of $p$ when $p$ is odd.

However, it can be shown that $\nu_2(x^n-y^n) = \nu_2(x-y)+\nu_2(n)$ when $4 \mid x-y$ by writing $n = 2^ab$ where $a$ and $b$ are integers with $b$ odd and noting that

$$\begin{align}
\nu_2(x^n-y^n) &= \nu_2((x^{2^a})^b-(y^{2^a})^b) \\
&= \nu_2(x^{2^a}-y^{2^a}) \\
&= \nu_2((x^{2^{a-1}}+y^{2^{a-1}})(x^{2^{a-2}}+y^{2^{a-2}})\cdots(x^2+y^2)(x+y)(x-y)) \\
&= \nu_2(x-y)+a
\end{align}$$

because $x \equiv y \equiv \pm 1 \pmod{4}$ implies that each factor of the form $x^{2^k}+y^{2^k}$ in the difference-of-squares step is congruent to 2 modulo 4.

The stronger statement $\nu_2(x^n-y^n) = \nu_2(x-y)+\nu_2(x+y)+\nu_2(n)-1$ when $2 \mid x-y$ is proven analogously.

== Example problem ==
Problem 12 of the March 2020 AIME:

Let $n$ be the least positive integer for which $149^n-2^n$ is divisible by $3^3\cdot5^5\cdot7^7$. Find the number of positive integer divisors of $n$.

=== Solution ===
Note that $149-2 = 147 = 3\cdot 7^2$.

Using the lifting-the-exponent lemma, since $3 \nmid 149$ and $3 \nmid 2$, but $3 \mid 147$, $\nu_3(149^n-2^n) = \nu_3(147)+\nu_3(n) = \nu_3(n)+1$. Thus, $3^3 \mid 149^n-2^n \iff 3^2 \mid n$.

Similarly, $7 \nmid 149,2$ but $7 \mid 147$, so $\nu_7(149^n-2^n) = \nu_7(147)+\nu_7(n) = \nu_7(n)+2$ and $7^7 \mid 149^n-2^n \iff 7^5 \mid n$.

Since $5 \nmid 147$, the factors of 5 are addressed by noticing that since the residues of $149^n$ modulo 5 follow the cycle $4,1,4,1$ and those of $2^n$ follow the cycle $2,4,3,1$, the residues of $149^n-2^n$ modulo 5 cycle through the sequence $2,2,1,0$. Thus, $5 \mid 149^n-2^n$ iff $n = 4k$ for some positive integer $k$. The lemma can now be applied again: $\nu_5(149^{4k}-2^{4k}) = \nu_5((149^4)^k-(2^4)^k) = \nu_5(149^4-2^4)+\nu_5(k)$. Since $149^4-2^4 \equiv (-1)^4-2^4 \equiv -15 \pmod{25}$, $\nu_5(149^4-2^4) = 1$. Hence $5^5 \mid 149^n-2^n \iff 5^4 \mid k \iff 4\cdot 5^4 \mid n$.

Combining these three results, it is found that $n = 2^2\cdot 3^2\cdot 5^4\cdot 7^5$, which has $(2+1)(2+1)(4+1)(5+1) = 270$ positive divisors.
