= Loss of tail-rotor effectiveness =

Potential dangerous event during helicopter flight

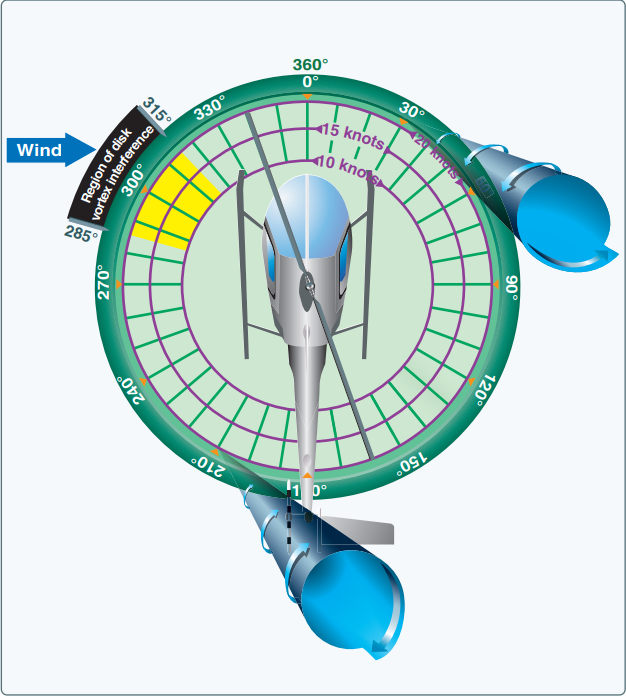
Main rotor disk vortex interference

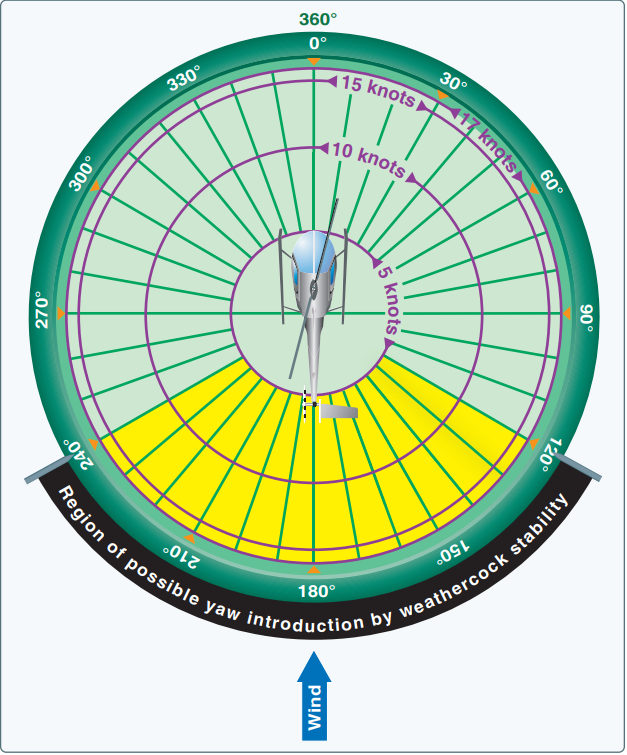
Weathercock stability

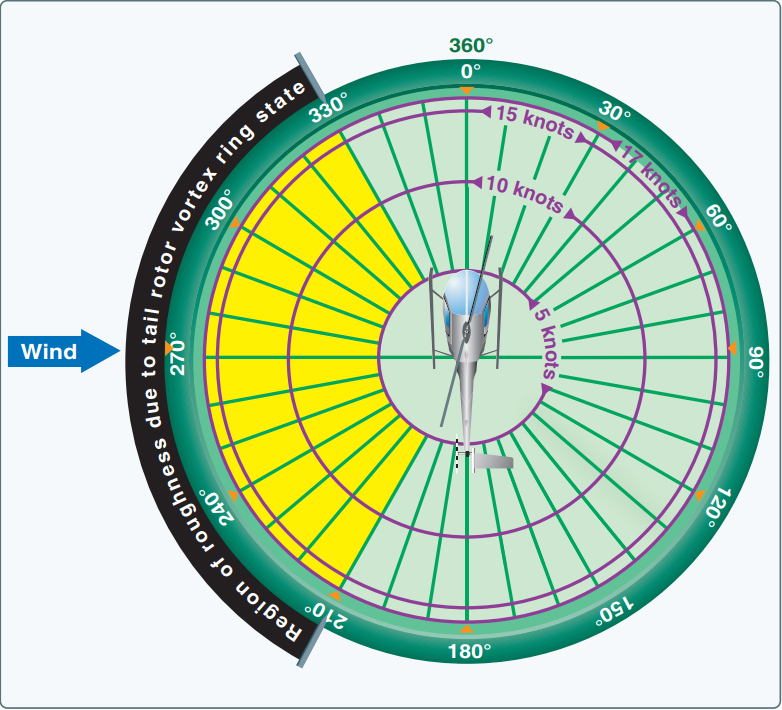
Tail rotor vortex ring state

Loss of tail-rotor effectiveness (LTE) occurs when the tail rotor of a helicopter is exposed to wind forces that inhibit its proper functioning—that of cancelling the torque of the engine and transmission. This risk arises when flying at high power and low airspeed.

== Causes ==
Environmental factors which can lead to LTE include higher operating-density altitudes or temperatures, and high winds. A high gross weight can also increase the risk of LTE. Causative wind-directions may include:

1. Main rotor disk interference – Main-rotor disk vortices are pushed into the tail rotor by wind. This can occur with wind coming from 10 o'clock on North American (counter-clockwise) rotors and from 2 o'clock on clockwise rotors. The wind pushes the dirty air and vortices generated from the main-rotor into the tail-rotor, preventing the tail rotor from having clean air to propel.
2. Weathercock stability – Wind from the tail (6 o'clock) can cause the helicopter to attempt to weathervane into the wind. The winds passing on both sides of the tail rotor make it teeter between being effective (providing thrust) and ineffective (not providing thrust). This creates a lot of pedal work for the pilot to eliminate unintended yaw.
3. Tail rotor vortex ring state – Wind moving in the same direction as the tail rotor moves air. With pusher tail-rotors, that is wind from the opposite side of the tail-rotor. With puller tail-rotors, that is wind from the same side as the tail rotor. For main rotors with clockwise rotation (European), that is wind from 3 o'clock. For main rotors with counter-clockwise rotation, that is wind from 9 o'clock. Analysis of flight test data verifies that the tail rotor does not stall. The helicopter will exhibit a tendency to make a sudden, uncommanded yaw that will develop into a high turn rate if not corrected. Recovery from this condition may be difficult if no airspeed is available, and will require entry into an autorotation (thus removing the torque of the engine and transmission).

== Indications of onset ==
Many factors affect the onset of LTE, but no matter which way it occurs, the clues are present:

- An environment of low airspeed, and a demand for power.
- An unintended yaw that may even be opposite to pedal input.

== Recovery ==
Recovery from an unexpected yaw movement is initiated by applying forward cyclic control to increase airspeed, and reducing power if at a safe altitude. If these measures are not effective, an entry into an autorotation may be necessary, applying full opposite rudder until rotation stops.

== See also ==
- Helicopter height–velocity diagram
