= Helicopter height–velocity diagram =

Safety diagram in aviation

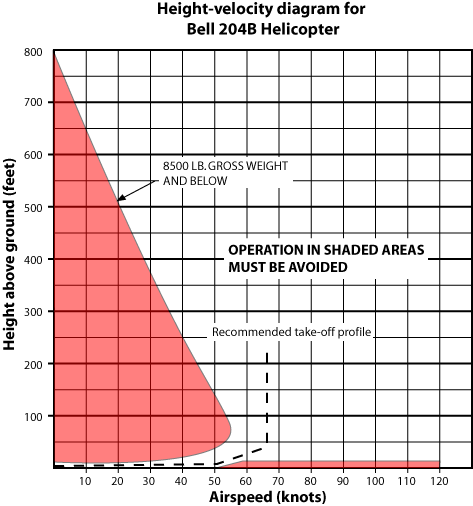
Bell 204B height–velocity diagram, showing the unsafe region on the left, due to insufficient airspeed for autorotation, the takeoff profile, and the unsafe region on the lower right due to limited pilot reaction time.

The FAA states "The height–velocity diagram or H/V curve is a graph charting safe or unsafe flight profiles relevant to a specific helicopter. As operation outside the safe area of the chart can be fatal in the event of a power or transmission failure, it is sometimes referred to as the dead man's curve when there is an unsafe combinations of low altitude and low speed where a helicopter does not have enough time or space to glide safely to the ground in the event of engine failures. The EASA refers to it as the "height/velocity avoid curve".

The H/V curve is a diagram indicating the combinations of height above ground and airspeed that should be avoided due to safety concerns relating to emergency landings. It is dangerous to operate within the shaded regions of the diagram, because it may be impossible for the pilot to complete an emergency autorotation from a starting point within these regions. The H/V curve also contains a take-off profile, indicating how a pilot can start from 0 height and 0 speed, and safely traverse to cruise. At low heights with low airspeed, such as a hover taxi, the pilot can simply cushion the landing with collective by converting rotational inertia into lift. Conversely, a complete power loss, and resultant crash landing, from a three-foot hover taxi at walking pace may be survivable. Multi-engine helicopters capable of flying and hovering on a single engine, don't depict this second region.

As the airspeed increases without an increase in height, there comes a point where the pilot's reaction time would be insufficient to initiate a flare, and prevent a high-speed ground impact. Each increase in height increases the pilot reaction time. This is the reason the bottom right part of the H/V curve has a shallow gradient. If above ideal autorotation speed, a pilot can avoid the deadman's curve by flaring, converting airspeed into height, and increasing rotor RPM through coning.

Likewise, an increase in height without a corresponding increase in airspeed is dangerous, as a crash from altitude may not be survivable without sufficient airspeed to convert into vertical deceleration. Airspeed has to increase beyond the 40–80 knot range, allowing the safe initiation of an autorotation. At significant height, a helicopter would be able to develop sufficient airspeed for autorotation even from zero airspeed. Thus a safe take-off profile, initiating forward flight from a low hover, involves gaining height as airspeed approaches a safe autorotation speed.

== See also ==
- Loss of tail-rotor effectiveness
