= Gamezebo =

Video game website

- Website type: Video games
- Available in: English
- Owners: iWin, Inc.
- Founder: Joel Brodie
- Editor: Jim Squires
- CEO: Joel Brodie
- Website: www.gamezebo.com
- Launched: 2005
- Current status: Online

Gamezebo (sometimes stylized GameZebo) is a website which reports on and reviews video games. Founded in 2005 by Joel Brodie, it was billed as the first website to solely cover casual games and expanded its scope to social games in 2009. This expansion included games on Facebook, iOS, and Android devices. After being acquired by the casual game company iWin in 2016, Gamezebo was redesigned and expanded its coverage to PC games. Gamezebo is based in Walnut Creek, California.

== History ==
Gamezebo was launched in 2005. It was founded by Joel Brodie, the former head of business development at Yahoo! Games. Brodie found that many video game publications "looked down" on casual games and started the website to review and cover news on the genre. It was billed as the first website which solely covered casual games.

Gamezebo and the Casual Games Association launched the Zeebys in 2007, which were awarded to casual games. Voting was open to members of the public. In 2008, it held another installment of the Zebbys which was aired on Lifetime, and was nominated for a Webby Award for 'Games-Related' websites. Gamezebo used RSS for its content feed. In 2009, Gamezebo expanded its scope with the growing popularity of social games such as FarmVille (2009). By February 2010, it had a staff and twenty freelance journalists. The website was redesigned in 2014.

In 2015, editor-in-chief Jim Squires told MacRumors that Gamezebo was struggling as larger mobile developers shifted away from traditional advertising. In March 2016, Gamezebo was acquired by casual game company iWin. It launched another redesign shortly after, improving navigation and expanding its coverage to PC games.

=== Content ===
An article in Games and Culture found that Gamezebo catered to a broader audience than other video game news sites. Unlike websites aimed at "core gamers" like Kotaku and TouchArcade, which also exclusively cover mobile games, Gamezebo did not marginalize mobile games in its coverage.

== Organization ==
Gamezebo, Inc. is based in Walnut Creek, California. Its editor-in-chief is Jim Squires.

== Notable contributors ==
- Justin McElroy, podcaster and co-founder of Polygon
