= Ghosted =

Ghosted may refer to:

== Film and television ==
- Ghosted (2011 film), a British drama film
- Ghosted, a 2020 film by Tracie Laymon
- Ghosted (2023 film), an American romantic action-adventure film
- Ghosted (TV series), a 2017–2018 American sitcom
- Ghosted: Love Gone Missing, a 2019–2021 American reality TV series
- "Ghosted" (NCIS: Sydney), a 2023 TV episode

== Other uses ==
- Ghosted (album), a 2022 album by Oren Ambarchi, Johan Berthling, and Andreas Werliin
- Ghosted (comics), a 2013–2015 comic book series created by Joshua Williamson
- Ghosting (behavior), a sudden ending of all communication and contact with another person
- TMS (production team), also known as Ghosted, an English songwriting and record production team

== See also ==
- Ghost (disambiguation)
- Ghosting (disambiguation)
