= Ghosty =

Ghosty may refer to:

- Ghosty (band), an American rock band
- Ghosty (producer), a British DJ and record producer
- Ghosty (film), a 2023 Indian Tamil-language horror film

== See also ==
- Ghost (disambiguation)
- Ghostly (disambiguation)
