= Ghost show =

Ghost show may refer to:

== Arts and entertainment ==
- Midnight ghost show, traveling horror-themed stage shows popular from the 1930s to the 1970s
- Paranormal television, a genre of reality television

== See also ==
- Ghost (disambiguation)
