= Ghosting =

Ghosting may refer to:

== Common uses ==
- Ghosting (identity theft), a form of identity theft, whereby a person takes on the identity of a deceased person
- Ghosting (incarceration), repeatedly moving a prisoner through different institutions to avoid scrutiny, or because the prisoner has become unmanageable
- Ghosting (behavior), ending all communication and contact with another person without any apparent warning or justification
- Ghosting (television), a double image when receiving a distorted or multipath input signal in analog television broadcasting
- Ghosting (medical imaging), a visual artifact that occurs in magnetic resonance imaging (MRI) scans
- Ghosting, an offset printing defect produced in one of two ways, in which faint replicas of printed images appear in undesirable places
- Comment ghosting, a form of stealth banning on internet forums
- Key ghosting, a phenomenon where multiple simultaneous key presses on a computer keyboard can result in incorrectly registered keystrokes
- Lens flare, an optical effect caused by internal reflections
- Multiple appearances of the same object in high dynamic range imaging, where multiple images are merged into one.

== Arts, entertainment, and media ==
=== Music ===
- "Ghosting" (song), a song by Joe Bermudez
- "Ghostin", a song by Ariana Grande
- "Ghosting", a song by Mother Mother from the 2008 album O My Heart

=== Video games ===
- Ghosting (strategy), a way of playing a video game that emphasizes stealthiness
- Ghosting, a form of cheating in online games

=== Television ===
- Ghosting (TV series), a Philippine romantic fantasy series

== See also ==
- Ghosting: The Spirit of Christmas, a 2019 American Christmas television film
- Ghost (disambiguation)
- Ghost image (disambiguation)
- Ghostwriting, the practice of producing written material that is credited to another person
- Ghost riding, a dance performed outside one's moving automobile
