= Ghostly (disambiguation) =

Ghostly is the adjectival form of ghost.

Ghostly may also refer to:

- Ghostly (musician) (born 1997), English MC and producer
- Alice Ghostley (1923–2007), American actress
- Ghostly International, an American independent record label
- Ghostly, a 2015 anthology of ghost stories by Audrey Niffenegger
- Ghostly (The Amazing Digital Circus), a character from the animated series The Amazing Digital Circus

== See also ==
- Ghost (disambiguation)
- Ghosty (disambiguation), a British record producer
