= Gameorama =

Museum in Lucerne, Switzerland

Coordinates: 47.0507°N 8.3010°E

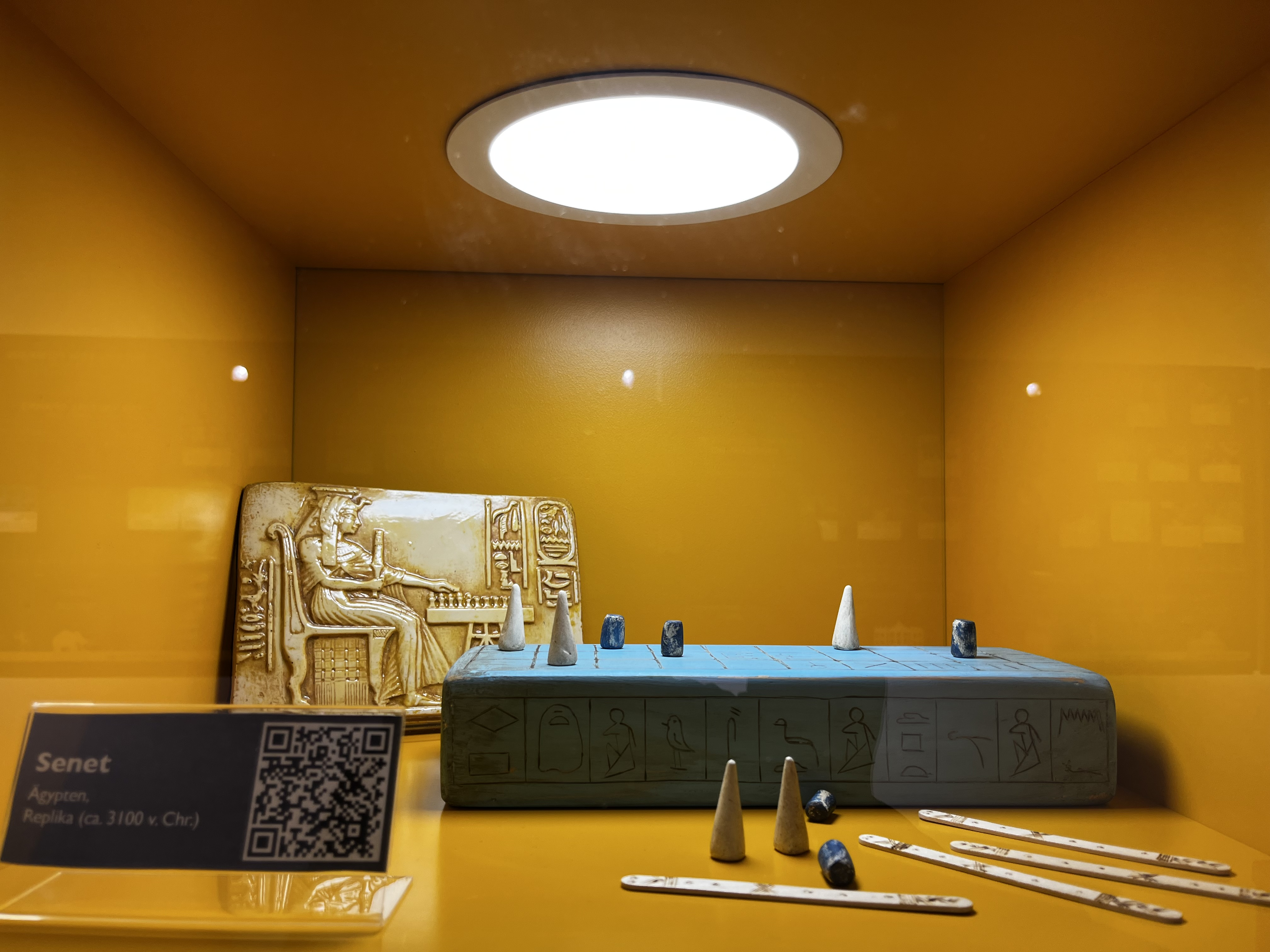
Replica of the ancient Egyptian board game Senet.

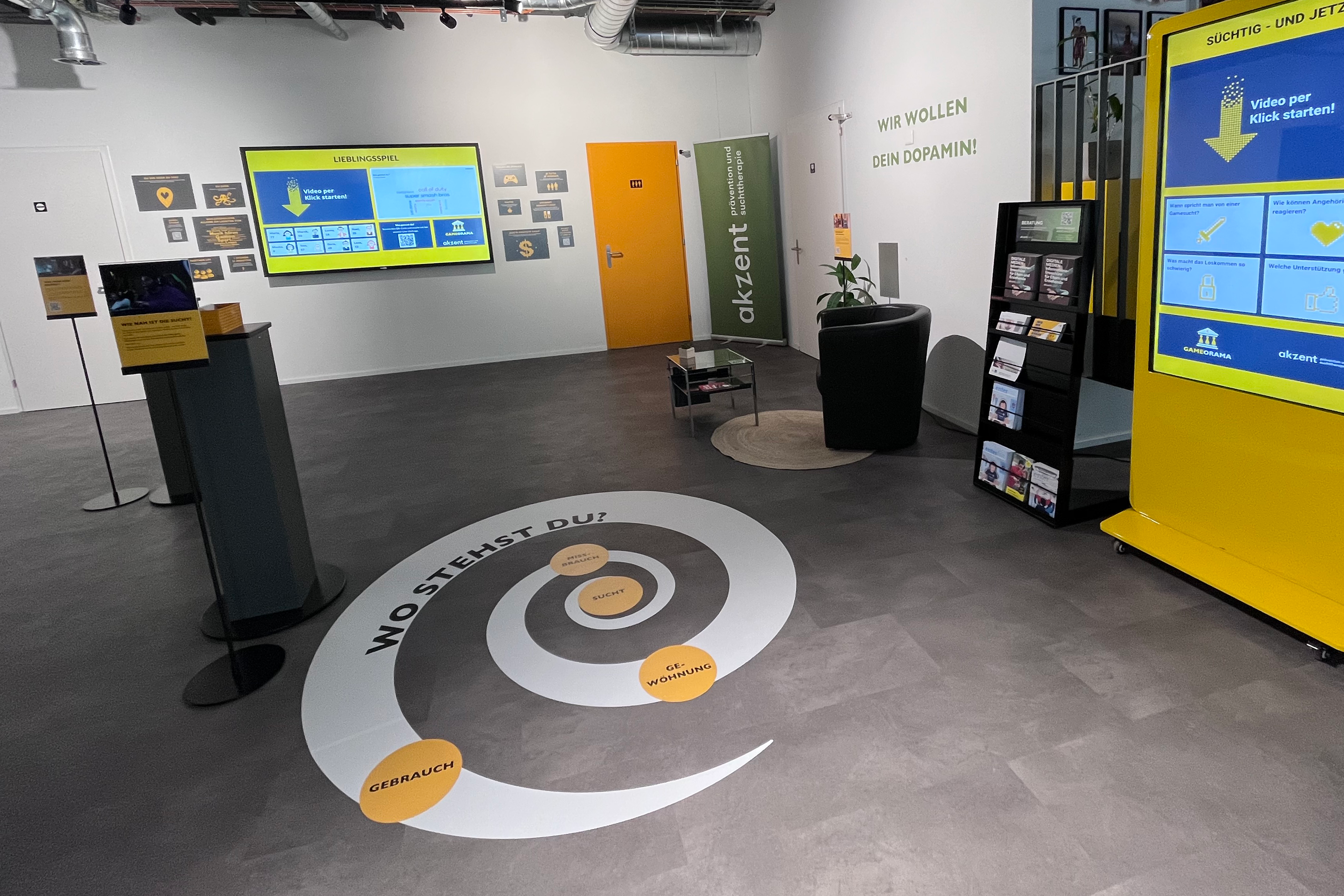
Special exhibition "Dopamine plays along" (November 2023 to July 2024)

The Gameorama in Lucerne is the only interactive play museum in Switzerland. It preserves, presents and shows exhibits within the topics of social games, slot machines and video games. It is located at Kasernenplatz, just outside of town (southern part of the historical centre).

== Exhibits ==
The Gameorama is primarily an exhibition space which includes various themed worlds (Games of Antiquity, pinball machines, arcade machines, video game consoles, video games and pub games). It also shows half-yearly selected special exhibitions on diverse themes to do with gaming culture, individual exhibits of which become integrated in the permanent installation.

The experience is complemented with a board games cafe, containing over nine hundred board games and card games, four escape rooms, and a virtual reality arena.

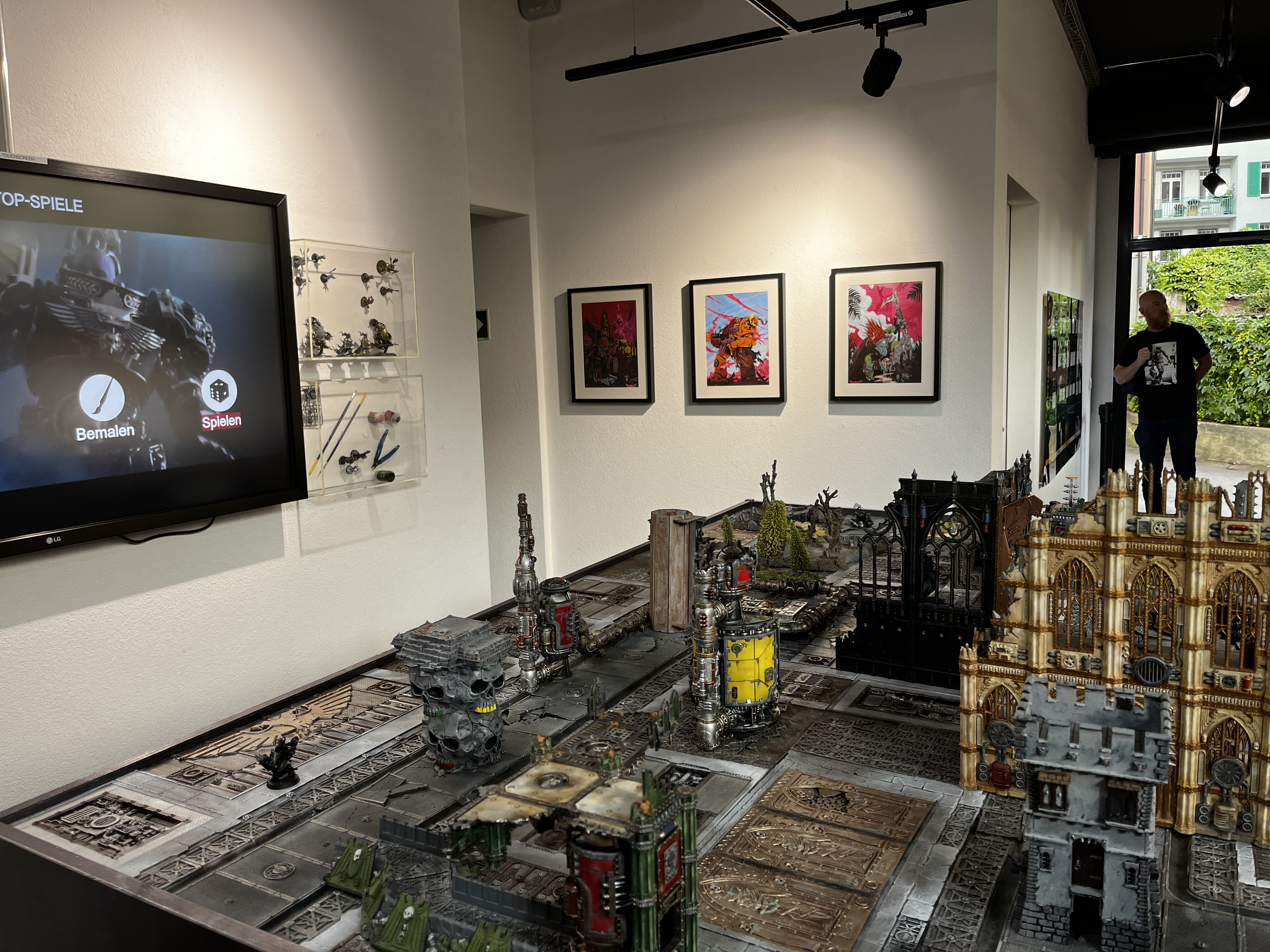
Special exhibition on tabletop games (July to December 2022)

== Financing and corporate structure ==
The Gameorama is an independent GmbH, entirely funded by its own revenue. It is a member of the Swiss Museum Pass, part of the Association of Swiss Museums and the United Museums of Lucerne.

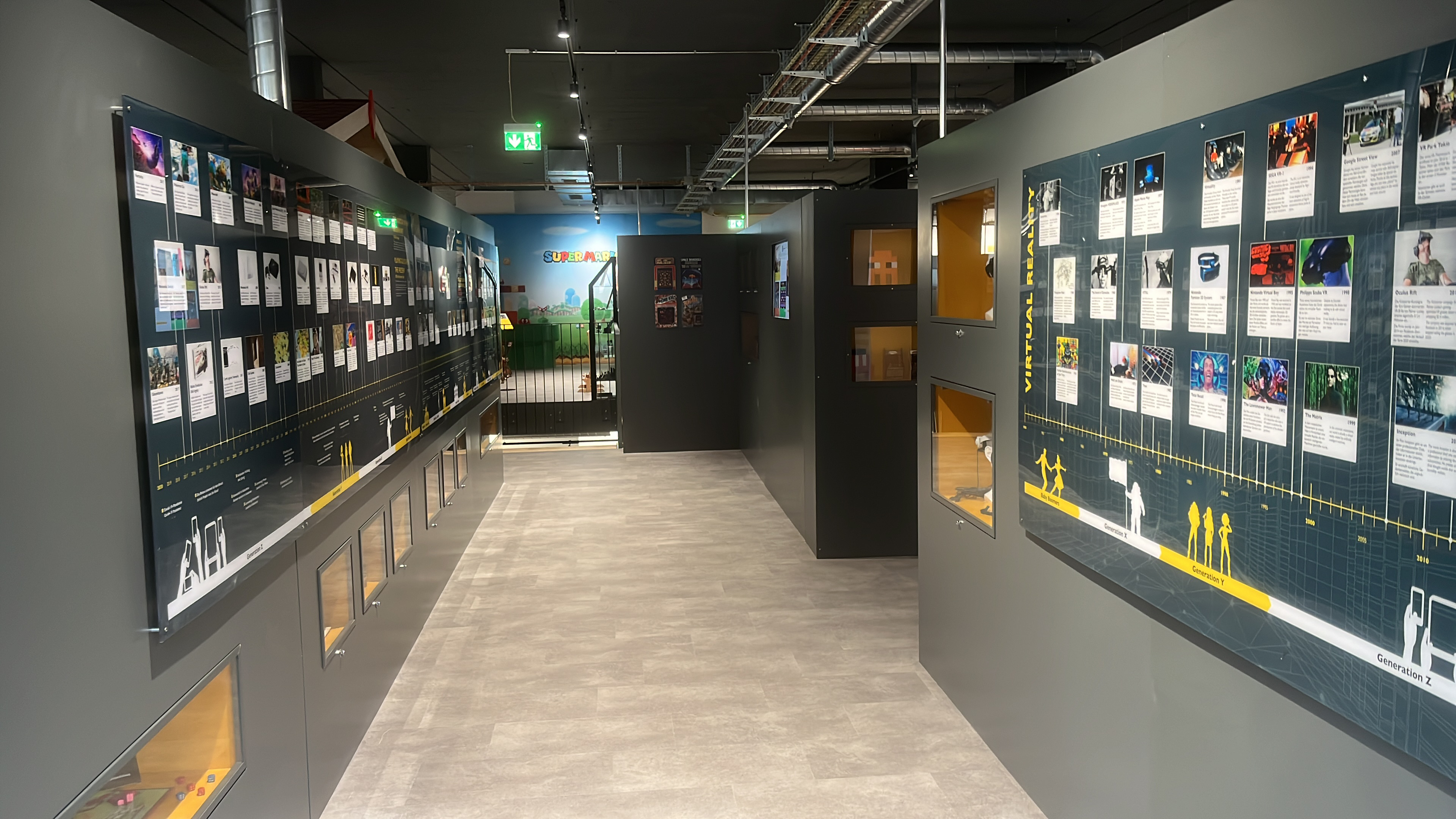
Seven metre long timeline which shows the development of gaming culture.

== History ==
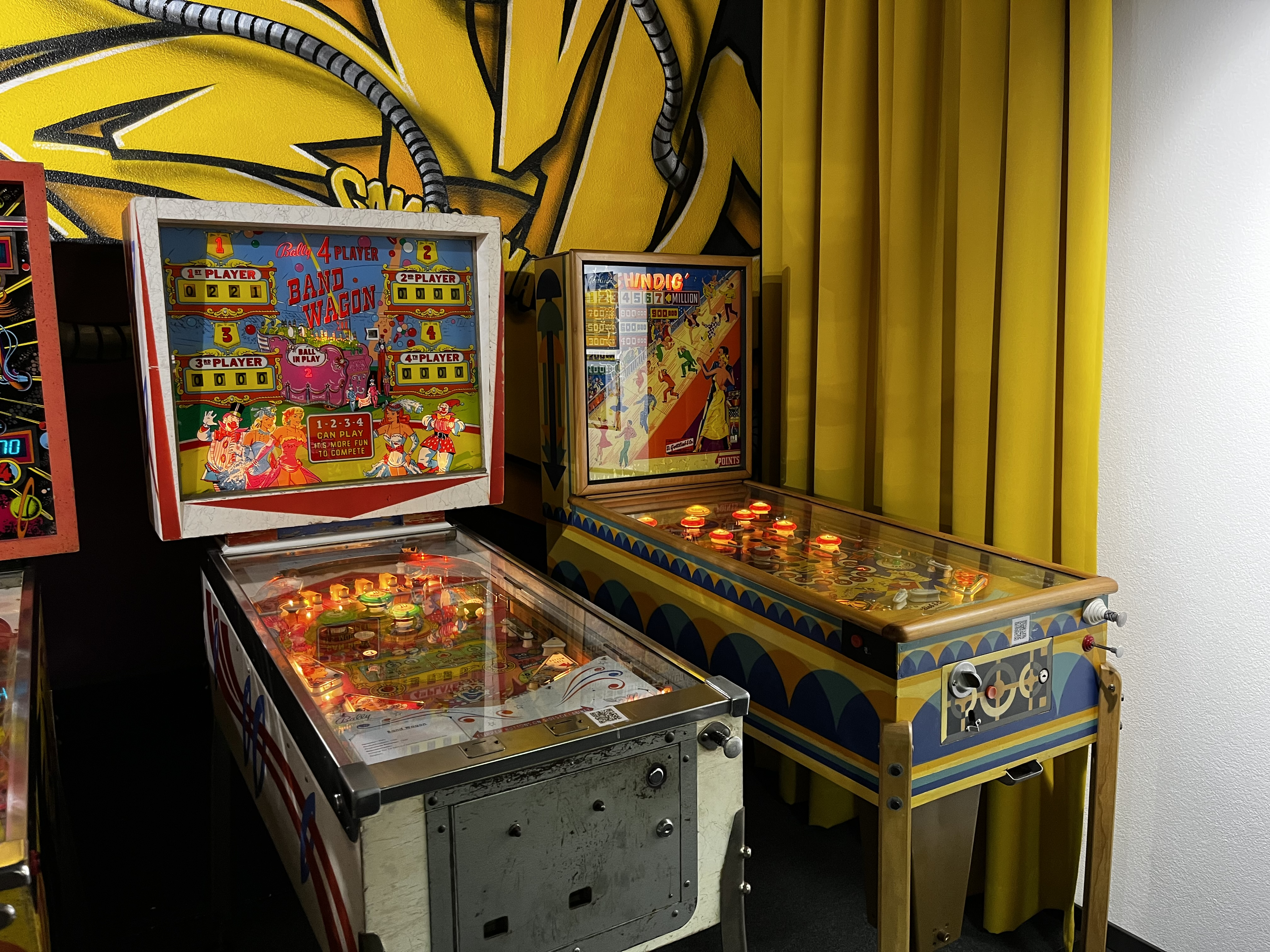
Pinball machines from the 50s and 60s.

The project team (Angela Vögtli, Jerome Müller, Stefan Chiavelli and Luc Meyer) developed the concept of the Gameorama in 2018 in the context of bidding for use of the Three Linden Trees Park area of Lucerne. The concept was shortlisted, but ultimately not included in the proposal.

As the feedback was nevertheless very positive, the team decided to progress on the project in spite of the City of Lucerne's refusal, and to search for an alternative location. In 2019 the location was found in the new town district, and the museum could open on the 27th June 2020. The team consisted of Angela Vögtli, Jerome Müller und Marco Röllin at this time.

In November 2023 the Gameorama moved to the old post office on 49 Hirschengraben. The new location opened on 29 November 2023. With the increased exhibition space, the themed worlds were newly upgraded with handhelds, skill games, strategy games and Swiss games. Amidst the expansion, Lukas Schnieper came on board as a co-owner and manager.

== Recognition ==
On 13 July 2025, the Gameorama received the Lucerne Tourism Panel Newcomer Award at the presentation of Tourism Awards, in appreciation of excellent service, expertise, innovation, entrepreneurship and commitment to tourism and business in central Switzerland.
