= Ghost image =

Ghost image may refer to:

- An image of a ghost
  - Spirit photography, an attempt to capture an image of a ghost
- Afterimage, an image that continues to appear in the eyes after exposure has ceased
- Ghosting (television), an offset replica of a transmitted image in an analogue broadcast
- Ghost imaging, a phenomenon in elementary physics
- Image persistence, the temporary retention of a picture on LCD and plasma screens
- Screen burn-in, the discoloration of a display by non-uniform use

== See also ==
- Ghosting (disambiguation)
