= IAI Ghost =

Israeli unmanned air vehicle

Ghost
- Illustration of IAI Ghost rotary mini UAS

General information
- Type: Reconnaissance UAV
- National origin: Israel
- Manufacturer: IAI
- Designer: IAI

History
- Introduction date: 2011

The IAI Ghost is a reconnaissance mini unmanned air vehicle developed in Israel by Israel Aircraft Industries. It is the second tandem-rotor UAV developed by IAI after IAI Panther.

The Ghost appearance is like miniature model of Chinook helicopter. It was developed to support Missions in urban warfare. The quickly deploy-able and easily operate-able system can carry in two backpacks that can be quickly assembled. It has low acoustic, silent propulsion and mission versatility that can perform in day and night. Due to automatic vertical takeoff and landing, it is suitable for use in densely built-up areas. Its functions can be operated by simple man-machine interface.

The main purpose of the Ghost is to intelligence, surveillance and reconnaissance missions, including silent observation, stakeout and covert special operation missions.

== Specifications ==
Data from Israel Aerospace Industries

General characteristics

- Crew: None
- Capacity: 4kg (Maximum Takeoff weight)
- Length: 1.45 m (4 ft 8 in) ; 1.06 m (3 ft 6 in) folded
- Wingspan: 0.75 m (2 ft 5 in) ; 0.11 m (4.3 in) folded
- Powerplant: × Electrical

Performance

- Maximum speed: 64.8 km/h (40 mph, 35 kn)
- Range: 4.0 km (2.0 mi, 1.7 nmi)
- Endurance: 30 minutes
