= Ghost (comics) =

Ghost, in comics, may refer to:

- Ghost (Dark Horse Comics), a superhero and star of her own series, published in the 1990s and revived in 2012
- Ghosts (comics), an anthology of tales of the supernatural
- Ghost (Marvel Comics), a supervillain and foe of Iron Man
- Ghost (Nedor Comics), a Nedor Comics superhero from the Golden Age of Comics
- Ghost, a foe of Captain Atom in Charlton and later DC Comics

== See also ==
- Ghost Girl, a Marvel Comics character
- Ghost Rider
  - The Phantom Rider, a Western-themed character originally known as the Ghost Rider
- The Gay Ghost or the Grim Ghost, a DC Comics character
- Gentleman Ghost or the Ghost, a DC Comics villain
- The Grim Ghost, an Atlas/Seaboard Comics character
- Casper the friendly ghost, in Harvey Comics
- Ghost (disambiguation)
