= Ghost (disambiguation) =

A ghost is a spirit of a dead person that may appear to the living.

Ghost or Ghosts may also refer to:

== People ==
- Ghost (producer), British hip hop producer
- Ghost (singer) (born 1974), singer
- Dave Casper (born 1952), a.k.a. The Ghost, American football wide receiver
- Shayne Gostisbehere (born 1993), a.k.a. The Ghost, American ice hockey player
- Robert Guerrero (born 1983), a.k.a. The Ghost, American boxer
- Ivan Moody (born 1980), a.k.a. Ghost, member of Five Finger Death Punch
- Styles P (born 1974), a.k.a. The Ghost, American rapper
- Kelly Pavlik (born 1982), a.k.a. The Ghost, American boxer
- Matt Urban (1919–1995), a.k.a. The Ghost, US Army lieutenant colonel

== Arts, entertainment, and media ==
=== Fictional entities ===
- Ghost (comics), several characters and publications
- Ghost (Dungeons & Dragons)
- Ghost (Hamlet), a character from William Shakespeare's play Hamlet
- Ghost (The Matrix), a character in Enter the Matrix
- Ghost, the robotic companion of guardians in Destiny
- Ghost, a character in the novel Lost Souls
- Haunter (Pokémon), known in Japan as Ghost
- Ghosts (Ninjago), characters in Ninjago
- Ghosts (Pac-Man), the recurring antagonists in the Pac-Man franchise
- Ghosts, group of Gaunt's Ghosts characters
- Ghosts, type of Terran soldier in StarCraft
- Simon "Ghost" Riley, a character in Call of Duty
- The Ghost, a VCX-100 light freighter from Star Wars: Rebels
- Ghost, the ship of Wolf Larsen in Jack London's novel The Sea-Wolf

=== Films ===
- Ghosts (1915 film), a silent American film starring Henry B. Walthall, based on the play by Henrik Ibsen
- The Ghost (1963 film), an Italian horror film
- The Ghost (1982 film), a German drama
- Ghost (1984 film), a Japanese experimental short film
- Ghosts… of the Civil Dead, a 1988 Australian political suspense film
- Ghost (1990 film), an American fantasy film
- Michael Jackson's Ghosts, a 1997 short film
- Ghost (1998 film), an Iranian film
- The Ghost (2004 film), a South Korean horror film
- Ghosts (2005 film), a German drama
- Ghosts (2006 film), a British drama
- The Ghost (2008 film), a Russian thriller
- The Ghost (2010 film), a French-German-British political thriller
- Ghost: In Your Arms Again, a 2010 Japanese remake of the 1990 American film Ghost
- Ghost (2012 film), an Indian horror film
- Ghosts (2014 film), an Iranian drama
- Ghost (2015 film), a Russian film
- Ghost (2019 film), an Indian horror thriller
- Ghost (2020 film), a British independent film about the first day of freedom for an ex-con
- Ghosts (2020 film), a Turkish-French-Qatari drama
- The Ghost (2022 film), an Indian Telugu-language action thriller
- Ghost (2022 film), an Emirati horror film
- Ghost (2023 film), an Indian Kannada-language heist action thriller
- An Taibhse (English: The Ghost), a 2024 Irish horror film
- Ghosts: The Possession of Button House, a 2026 British fantasy comedy film
- Ghost (2027 film), an original anime film

=== Theatre ===
- Ghosts (play), by Henrik Ibsen

=== Gaming ===
- Ghost (game), word game
- Ghost (video gaming), game feature
- Ghosts (video game), an upcoming game
- Call of Duty: Ghosts, a 2013 game in the Call of Duty franchise
- Ghost 1.0, video game
- Ghosts (board game)
- StarCraft: Ghost, indefinitely suspended video game
- Ghosts of Tabor, a 2024 extraction shooter

=== Literature ===
- Ghost (Reynolds novel), by Jason Reynolds
- "Ghost", a story by Larry Niven in Crashlander
- Ghost, by John Ringo
- Ghosts (Aira novel), 1990, by César Aira
- Ghosts (Auster novel), by Paul Auster
- Ghosts (Banville novel), 1993, by Irish writer John Banville
- Ghosts (graphic novel), 2016, by Raina Telgemeier
- The Ghost (novel), by Robert Harris
- The Ghost, novel series by George Mann
- The Ghosts, 1969 novel by Antonia Barber
- The Ghost: The Secret Life of CIA Spymaster James Jesus Angleton, a 2017 book by Jefferson Morley
- Star Trek: The Next Generation – Ghosts, a Star Trek five-issue comic book limited series published by IDW Publishing (November 2009–March 2010)

=== Music ===
==== Groups and labels ====
- Ghost (1984 band), Japanese experimental rock group
- Ghost (2004 band), Japanese visual kei rock group
- Ghost (Swedish band), rock group
- Ghosts (band), British indie/pop group
- The Ghost (American band), American punk rock group
- The Ghost (Faroese band), electropop duo
- Ghost9, South Korean boygroup

==== Albums ====
- Ghost (soundtrack), to the 1990 film
- Ghost (Crack the Sky album), 2001
- Ghost (Devin Townsend Project album), 2011
- Ghost (Gary Numan album), 1988
- Ghost (Ghost album), 1990
- Ghost (In Fiction EP), 2007
- Ghost (Kate Rusby album), 2014
- Ghost (Radical Face album), 2007
- Ghost (Sky Ferreira EP), 2012
- Ghost (Third Eye Foundation album), 1997
- Ghosts (Albert Ayler album), 1965
- Ghosts (Ash Riser album), 2017
- Ghosts (Big Wreck album), 2014
- Ghosts (Cowboy Junkies album), 2020
- Ghosts (The Marked Men album), 2009
- Ghosts (Monolake album), 2012
- Ghosts (Rage album), 1999
- Ghosts (Siobhán Donaghy album), 2007
- Ghosts (Sleeping at Last album), 2003
- Ghosts (Strawbs album), 1975
- Ghosts (Techno Animal album), 1991
- Ghosts (Wendy Matthews album), 1997
- Ghosts, a series of albums by Nine Inch Nails:
  - Ghosts I–IV, 2008
  - Ghosts V: Together, 2020
  - Ghosts VI: Locusts, 2020
- The Ghost, a tour-only release by Songs: Ohia (Jason Molina), 1999
- The Ghost (Before the Dawn album), 2006

==== Songs ====
- "Ghost" (Ella Henderson song), 2014
- "Ghost" (Fefe Dobson song), 2010
- "Ghost" (Gackt song), 2009
- "Ghost" (Halsey song), 2015
- "Ghost" (Jamie-Lee Kriewitz song), 2015
- "Ghost" (Justin Bieber song), 2021
- "Ghost" (Mystery Skulls song), 2013
- "Ghost" (Phish song), 1998
- "Ghost", by 5 Seconds of Summer from Everyone's a Star!, 2025
- "Ghost", by The 69 Eyes from Angels, 2007
- "Ghost", by Ateez from Golden Hour: Part.4, 2026
- "Ghost", by The Autumn Offering from Embrace the Gutter, 2006
- "Ghost", by Ava Max from Diamonds & Dancefloors, 2023
- "Ghost", by Baekhyun from Delight, 2020
- "Ghost", by Beat Crusaders from EpopMAKING ~ Pop Tono Sogu ~, 2007
- "Ghost", by Betraying the Martyrs from The Resilient, 2017
- "Ghost", by Buckethead from Colma, 1998
- "Ghost", by Clutch from Blast Tyrant, 2004
- "Ghost", by Dawn of Solace from Waves, 2020
- "Ghost", by Demi Lovato from It's Not That Deep, 2025
- "Ghost", by Depeche Mode from Sounds of the Universe, 2009
- "Ghost", by Guttermouth from Full Length LP, 1991
- "Ghost", by Hollywood Undead from Day of the Dead, 2015
- "Ghost", by Hoshimachi Suisei as a single, 2021
- "Ghost", by House of Heroes from The End Is Not the End, 2009
- "Ghost", by Howie Day from Australia, 2000
- "Ghost", by Imminence from Heaven in Hiding, 2021
- "Ghost", by Indigo Girls from Rites of Passage, 1992
- "Ghost", by Ingrid Michaelson from Human Again, 2011
- "Ghost", by American rapper Jaden
- "Ghost", by Jes from Disconnect
- "Ghost", by Katy Perry from Prism, 2013
- "Ghost", by Little Boots from Hands, 2009
- "Ghost", by Live from Secret Samadhi, 1997
- "Ghost", by Mark Owen from The Art of Doing Nothing, 2013
- "Ghost", by MisterWives from Superbloom, 2020
- "Ghost", by Mnemic from Mechanical Spin Phenomena, 2003
- "Ghost", by Mystery Skulls from Forever, 2014
- "Ghost", by Neutral Milk Hotel from In the Aeroplane Over the Sea, 1998
- "Ghost", by Novembers Doom from Harmatia, 2017
- "Ghost", by Pearl Jam from Riot Act, 2002
- "Ghost", by Plastic Tree from Chandelier, 2005
- "Ghost", by Reflections from Willow, 2020
- "Ghost", by Sir Sly from Gold, 2013
- "Ghost", by Skip the Use from Can Be Late, 2012
- "Ghost", by Slash from Slash, 2010
- "Ghost", by Sleeping with Sirens from How It Feels to Be Lost, 2019
- "Ghost", by Stray Kids from Karma, 2025
- "Ghost", by Tom Swoon, 2014
- "Ghost", the first part of the 2013 song "Haunted" by Beyoncé
- "Ghost", by Zoe Wees from Golden Wings, 2021
- "Ghost", by Wage War from Pressure, 2019
- "Ghost", by ZZ Ward from The Storm, 2017
- "Ghost!", by Kid Cudi from Man on the Moon II: The Legend of Mr. Rager, 2010
- "Ghosts" (Bruce Springsteen song), 2020
- "Ghosts" (Dirty Vegas song), 2002
- "Ghosts" (Japan song), 1982
- "Ghosts" (Laura Marling song), 2007
- "Ghosts" (Michael Jackson song), 1997
- "Ghosts" (The Presets song), 2012
- "Ghosts", by 1 Giant Leap from 1 Giant Leap, 2002
- "Ghosts", by Albert Ayler from Spiritual Unity, 1965
- "Ghosts", by Ariel Pink and John Maus from Lover Boy, 2002
- "Ghosts", by Assemblage 23 from Meta, 2007
- "Ghosts", by August Burns Red from Found in Far Away Places, 2015
- "Ghosts", by Big Wreck from Ghosts, 2014
- "Ghosts", by Caravan Palace from Chronologic, 2019
- "Ghosts", by Celldweller from Celldweller, 2013 reissue
- "Ghosts", by Funeral for a Friend from Memory and Humanity, 2008
- "Ghosts", by Ghosts from The World Is Outside, 2007
- "Ghosts", by Jake Owen from Startin' with Me, 2006
- "Ghosts", by The Jam from The Gift, 1982
- "Ghosts", by Kansas from In the Spirit of Things, 1988
- "Ghosts", by Ladytron from Velocifero, 2008
- "Ghosts", by Mike Shinoda from Post Traumatic, 2018
- "Ghosts", by PVRIS from White Noise, 2014
- "Ghosts", by Rage from Ghosts, 1999
- "Ghosts", by Robbie Williams from Intensive Care, 2005
- "Ghosts", by Shellac from 1000 Hurts, 2000
- "Ghosts", by Susumu Hirasawa from Sword-Wind Chronicle BERSERK Original Soundtrack, 1997
- "Ghosts", by VOLA from Applause of a Distant Crowd, 2018
- "Ghosts", by We Came as Romans from Tracing Back Roots, 2013
- "Ghosts", by Xandria from The Wonders Still Awaiting, 2023
- "Ghosts", by Yung Lean and Bladee from Psykos, 2024
- "Ghosts", by Yungblud from Idols, 2025
- "The Ghost", by Mors Principium Est from Embers of a Dying World, 2017

==== Other music ====
- Ghost, a piano trio by Beethoven
- Ghost note, a type of musical note
- Ghost the Musical, a 2011 stage musical

=== Television ===
==== Series ====
- Ghost (Malaysian TV series), a 2008 mystery series
- Phantom (South Korean TV series), a 2012 police procedural series, also known as Ghost
- Ghosts (1995 TV series), a British drama series
- Ghosts (2019 TV series), a British sitcom
- Ghosts (American TV series), a 2021 sitcom based on the 2019 British sitcom
- Kamen Rider Ghost, a 2015–16 TV Asahi tokusatsu series

==== Episodes ====
- "Ghost" (Dollhouse)
- "Ghosts" (Castle)
- "Ghosts", an episode of Dark
- "Ghosts" (Frankie Drake Mysteries)
- "Ghosts" (Gotham)
- "Ghosts" (Hidden Palms)
- "Ghosts" (Justified)
- "Ghosts" (The Morning Show)
- "Ghosts", an episode of One Day at a Time
- "Ghosts" (Person of Interest)
- "Ghosts", a season two episode of The Protector
- "Ghosts" (Psych)
- "Ghosts" (The Walking Dead)
- Ghosts (What We Do in the Shadows)
- "The Ghost" (Agents of S.H.I.E.L.D.)
- "The Ghost" (The Amazing World of Gumball)
- "The Ghost" (Miracles)

== Computing ==
- Ghost (blogging platform), blogging software built in JavaScript
- Ghost (communication network), discontinued communications network and service provider
- Ghost (disk utility), a disk cloning program
- G.ho.st, an operating system

== Science ==
=== Biology ===
- Ghost cell, a necrotic cell that retains its cellular architecture but has no nucleus
- Ghost lineage, an inferred phylogenetic lineage
- Ghost population, an inferred statistical population

=== Physics ===
- Ghost (physics), an unphysical state in quantum field theory
  - Faddeev–Popov ghost, a type of unphysical field in quantum field theory
- Gemini High-resolution Optical Spectrograph (GHOST) a telescope instrument

== Vehicles ==
- Anduril Ghost, a rotary mini unmanned air vehicle
- IAI Ghost, a rotary mini unmanned air vehicle
- Juliet Marine Systems Ghost, a stealth ship
- Rolls-Royce Ghost, a car

== Other uses ==
- Ghost (company), a beverage and supplement brand
- Ghost (fashion brand)
- Ghost (mascot), a joke mainly used by sports fans in Latin America
- Global horizontal sounding technique, an atmospheric field research project in the late 1960s

== See also ==
- Ghosting (television), an unwanted image
- Ghosted (disambiguation)
- GOST, a set of international technical standards
- GOST (block cipher), a Soviet and Russian block cipher
- GOST (film speed), a Soviet film speed scale
- Gost, a rank in the Bosnian Church
