= Ghost of the B =

Latin American sports joke

In Latin American sports, the Ghost of the B (Spanish: Fantasma de la B) is a joke made about clubs in danger of descending into "B" Division.

The popularity of the character led to the inclusion of the mascot in a TV spot of Claudio Lozano for the 2013 elections in Argentina, this time as a joke for the candidate Daniel Filmus.
