= Ghost (2022 film) =

- Directed by: Cinema vision Films in collaboration with twofour54
- Written by: Amer Salmeen Al Murry
- Production company: Cinema vision Films in collaboration with twofour54
- Release date: 2022
- Running time: 110 minutes
- Country: United Arab Emirates
- Language: Arabic

Ghost is an Emirati horror film produced in 2020 and released in March 2022. It was written and directed by Amer Salmeen Al Murry.

== Plot and Events ==
The film unfolds within a framework of horror, suspense, and social mystery, centering on a family conflict over an ancient inheritance. The story follows a grandmother who demands that all family members gather at the large ancestral home before she agrees to sell it.

As the children move from Abu Dhabi to the family house, they encounter a series of mysterious events. The character "Abu Harb," played by Abdullah Al Junaibi, attempts to uncover the family's past to solve the puzzle and understand the causes of the supernatural phenomena haunting him and his family since their arrival.

== Cast ==
The film features a diverse group of actors, including:

- Alaa Shaker: Iraqi actress (b. 1977).
- jilali Boujemaa: Award-winning Algerian actor.
- Maryam Sultan: Emirati actress and director (b. 1948).
- Khaled Al Nuaimi: Emirati actor.
- Ahmed Shuaib: Saudi actor (b. 1981).
- Hamid Al Awadhi: Emirati actor and director.
- Abdullah Al Junaibi: Emirati director and actor (b. 1970).
- Maied Al Balushi: Kuwaiti actor (b. 1992).
- Saif Al Thujli
- Rehab Al Mheiri
- Lubna Al Hassan
- Kano Al Kindi
- Rasem Al Thahab

== About the film ==
twofour54 supported "Cinema Vision Films" in the production of the Emirati film "Ghost" by the award-winning Emirati director Amer Salmeen Al Murry. The filming took 30 days and was conducted across twofour54’s award-winning outdoor locations, as well as other sites in Abu Dhabi and Al Ain. The film also benefited from twofour54’s modern facilities and advanced infrastructure by utilizing post-production services for color grading and sound editing.

The filming took place in the "KIZAD" area belonging to twofour54, specifically in the palace where scenes from the Indian movie "Tiger Zinda Hai" were filmed. The director noted that the building, with its rich details, clearly enriched the film, leading him to modify some plot events to make the best possible use of the location.

The film "Ghost" is considered a unique Emirati cinematic experience in terms of content, story, acting performance, as well as direction and technical and cinematographic techniques, especially since its events rely on mystery and suspense within a horror framework. The film was originally scheduled for release in 2020, but due to the circumstances the country and the entire world were facing regarding the repercussions of the Coronavirus (COVID-19), the release was postponed until 2022.
