= IAI Panther =

2010s Israeli tiltrotor UAV

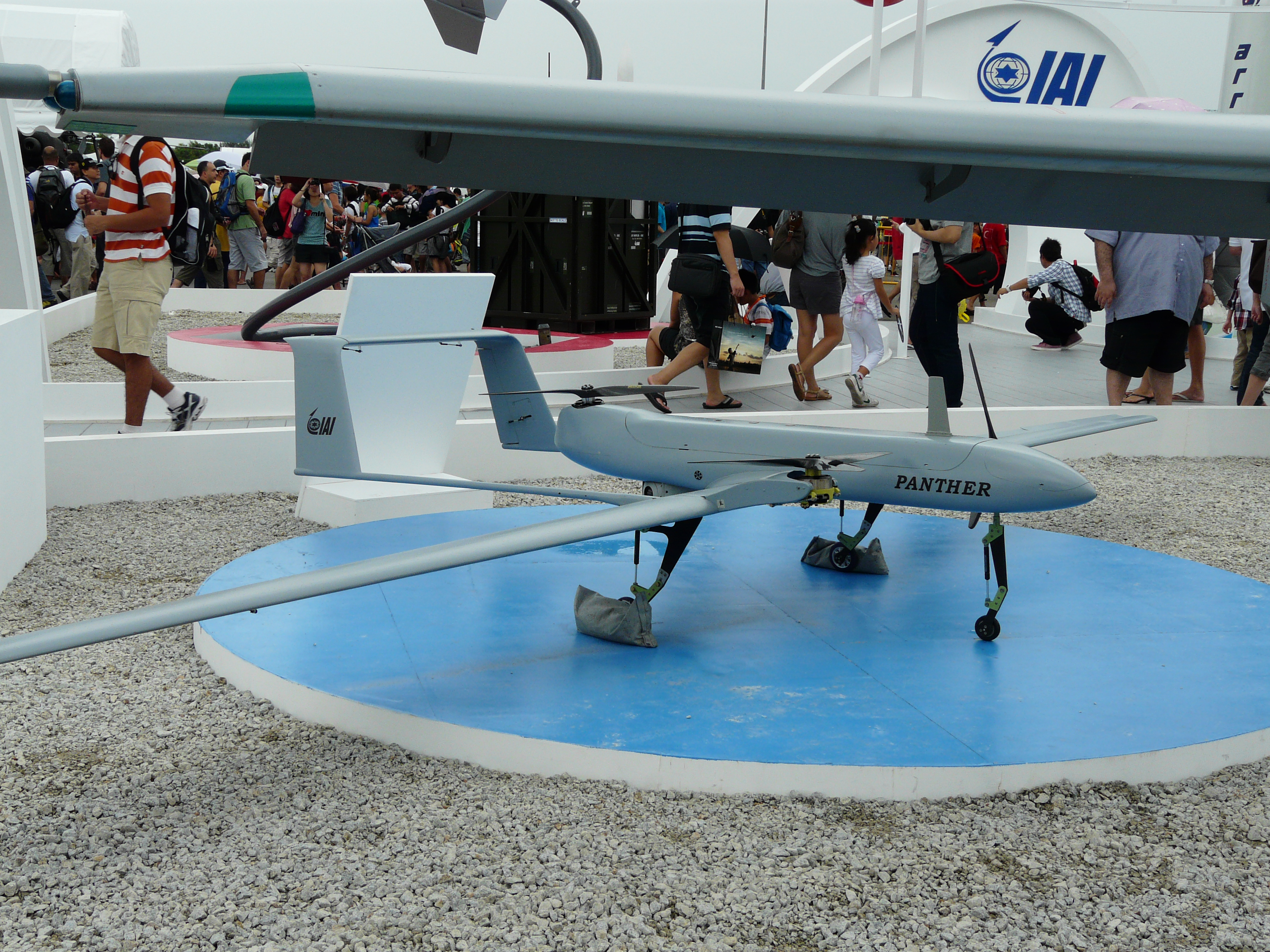
- IAI Panther on display at Singapore Airshow 2012.

General information
- Type: Unmanned aerial vehicle
- National origin: Israel
- Manufacturer: Israel Aerospace Industries

The Israel Aerospace Industries Panther is a tilt-rotor unmanned aerial vehicle (UAV) produced by Israel Aircraft Industries in Israel.

The Panther employs a tilt-rotor propulsion system patented by IAI and designed for tactical use, allowing runway-free takeoffs and landings on unprepared locations. It features three "ultra-quiet" electric motors, two of which are tilt-rotor and one providing additional lift for hovering, takeoff and landing. An automatic flight-control system controls the transition between the rotors' various positions.

Weighing roughly 65 kilograms (143 lb) the Panther has an operational radius of over 60 kilometres (37 mi) and can loiter for approximately six hours at an altitude of 10,000 feet (3,000 m). Its payload is IAI's Mini-POP electro-optical/infrared sensor, a stabilised camera with a laser rangefinder, pointer or laser designator.

The Panther is controlled from a two-man control station, one to control the aircraft and oversee tactical missions, and the other to act as the station manager. The two use identical consoles, while takeoff and landings are handled automatically.

A smaller version of the Panther, the Mini-Panther, is also available. Weighing 12 kilograms (26 lb) and capable of loitering for about two hours, it is controlled from a command and control center carried in backpacks by two operators.

The Panther was expected to be operational in 2011. The Panther was unveiled on October 5, 2010, at the Israeli land forces conference at Latrun and will be on display at the Association of the US Army’s (AUSA) 2010 Annual Meeting and Exposition in Washington DC. IAI revealed that the Panther is being evaluated by foreign special forces.

In October 2015, IAI unveiled a Panther version with a hybrid propulsion system called the Front Engine Panther (FE-Panther). The aircraft integrates an electric and internal combustion engine, increasing weight only to 67 kg (148 lb) while increasing endurance by 33 percent with the same 6 kg (13 lb) payload; the tilting electric motors are optimal for vertical takeoff, landing, and hovering, while the combustion engine would be employed for cruising. IAI signed a Memorandum of Understanding (MoU) with South Korean company Hankuk Carbon to offer the FE-Panther to fulfill the country's requirements for a VTOL UAS that can operate independently of runways in Korea's mountainous terrain.

== See also ==
- Science and technology in Israel
- List of Israeli inventions and discoveries
