= Good & Bad Ghosts =

Board game

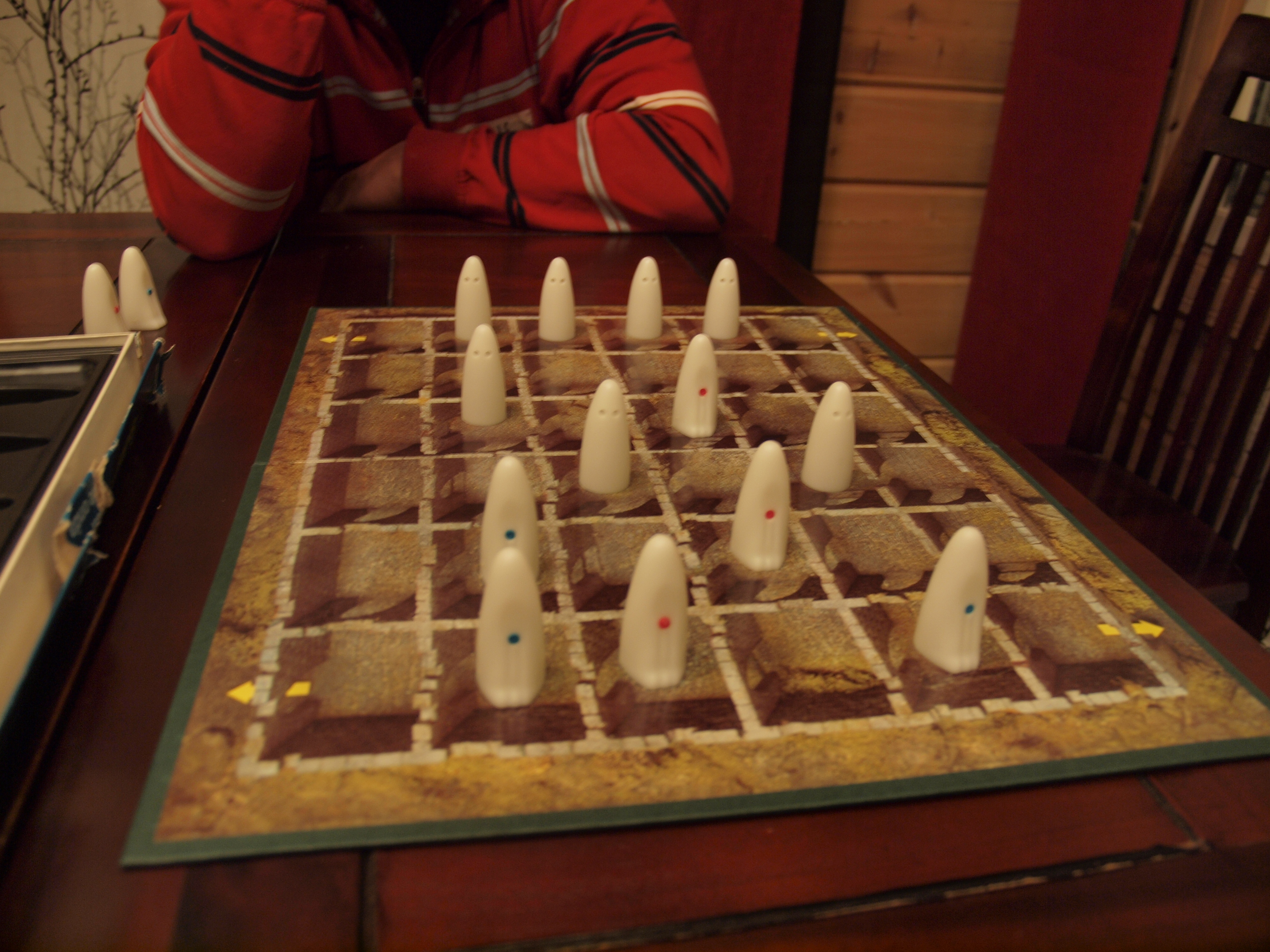
- Good & Bad Ghosts in the middle of play
- Other names: Ghosts!
- Publishers: Milton Bradley; Bütehorn Spiele; Drei Magier Spiele; Schmidt Spiele
- Publication: 1982; 44 years ago
- Genres: Horror game; Bluffing game
- Players: 2
- Playing time: 5–25 minutes
- Age range: 8+

Good & Bad Ghosts (German: Geister, Swedish: Spökspelet, French: Fantômes, Finnish: Kummituspeli) or Ghosts! is a supernatural horror board game designed by Alex Randolph for two players, and published in 1982 by Milton Bradley. Players navigate their ghosts across a board to either escape through one of the exits or capture all of their opponent's good ghosts, although which ghosts are good and which are evil are kept secret from the opposing player.

== Gameplay ==
Good & Bad Ghosts is played on a 6 by 6 gridded board with exits at each of the four corners and representing a haunted castle. Both players are given eight ghost pieces, four of which are good and four of which are evil. Dots on the back of the ghosts denote their alignment– good is represented by a blue dot and evil is represented by a red dot– but facing the front, all ghosts look the same. Thus, neither player knows which of their opponent's ghost pieces are good and which are evil.

At the start of the game, each player's ghosts are assembled in two rows of four ghosts at their back edge of the board in any arrangement of good and evil. On their turn, each player moves one ghost one square, either horizontally or vertically. A ghost may capture an opponent's ghost by moving to its square; only when a ghost is captured does the capturing player learn whether it is good or evil.

A player wins by capturing all four of their opponent's good ghosts, but a player loses if they capture all four of the opponent's evil ghosts. This means strategy mainly involves attempting to determine a ghost's alignment based on movement patterns and trying to fool the opponent with confusing movement patterns into capturing evil ghosts. A player can also win by moving one of their good ghosts through one of the exits at the opponent's side of the board.

== Reception ==
Good & Bad Ghosts was the winner of the 1986 Årets spil "Best Family Game Award". It was recommended for the 1982 Spiel des Jahres.

Jeux & Stratégie reviewed the game in Issue 33, praising it highly for its accessibility, tactical nuance, and presentation. In a review for Issue 68 of Games, R. Wayne Schmittberger described Good & Bad Ghosts as "a very challenging game for all ages" and praised the bluffing mechanics. The game was also featured in Games's 1986 Games 100.
