= Airbus RACER =

Experimental compound helicopter

RACER
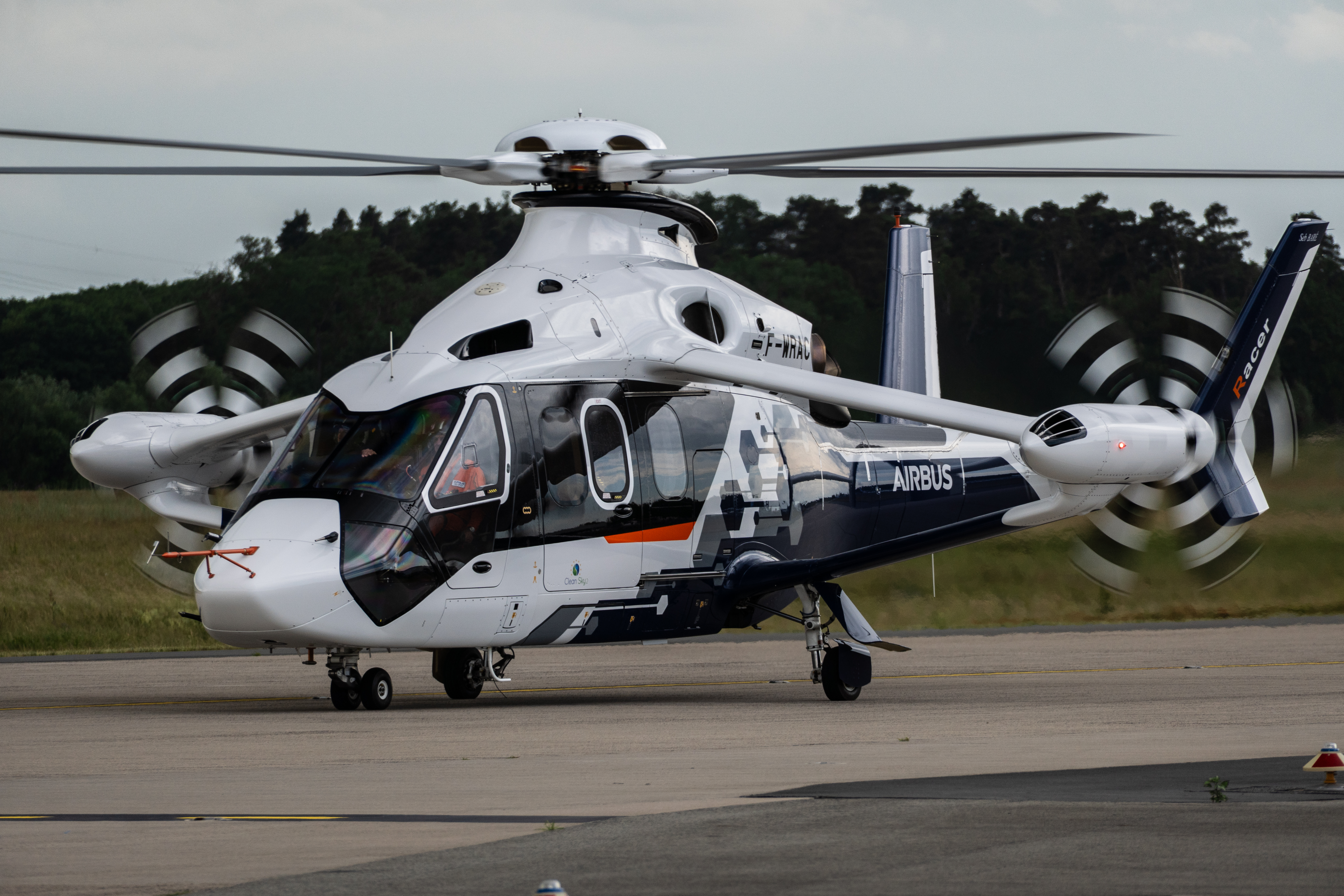
- RACER at ILA Berlin 2026

General information
- Type: Experimental compound helicopter
- National origin: Multinational
- Manufacturer: Airbus Helicopters
- Status: Under development

History
- First flight: 25 April 2024
- Developed from: Eurocopter X³

The Airbus RACER (Rapid and Cost-Effective Rotorcraft) is an experimental high-speed compound helicopter developed by Airbus Helicopters from the Eurocopter X³. It was revealed at the June 2017 Paris air show, final assembly slated to start in mid-2020 for a 2021 first flight. Actual first flight was in 2024. Cruising up to 400 km/h (216 kn), it aims for a 25% cost reduction per distance over a conventional helicopter.

== Development ==
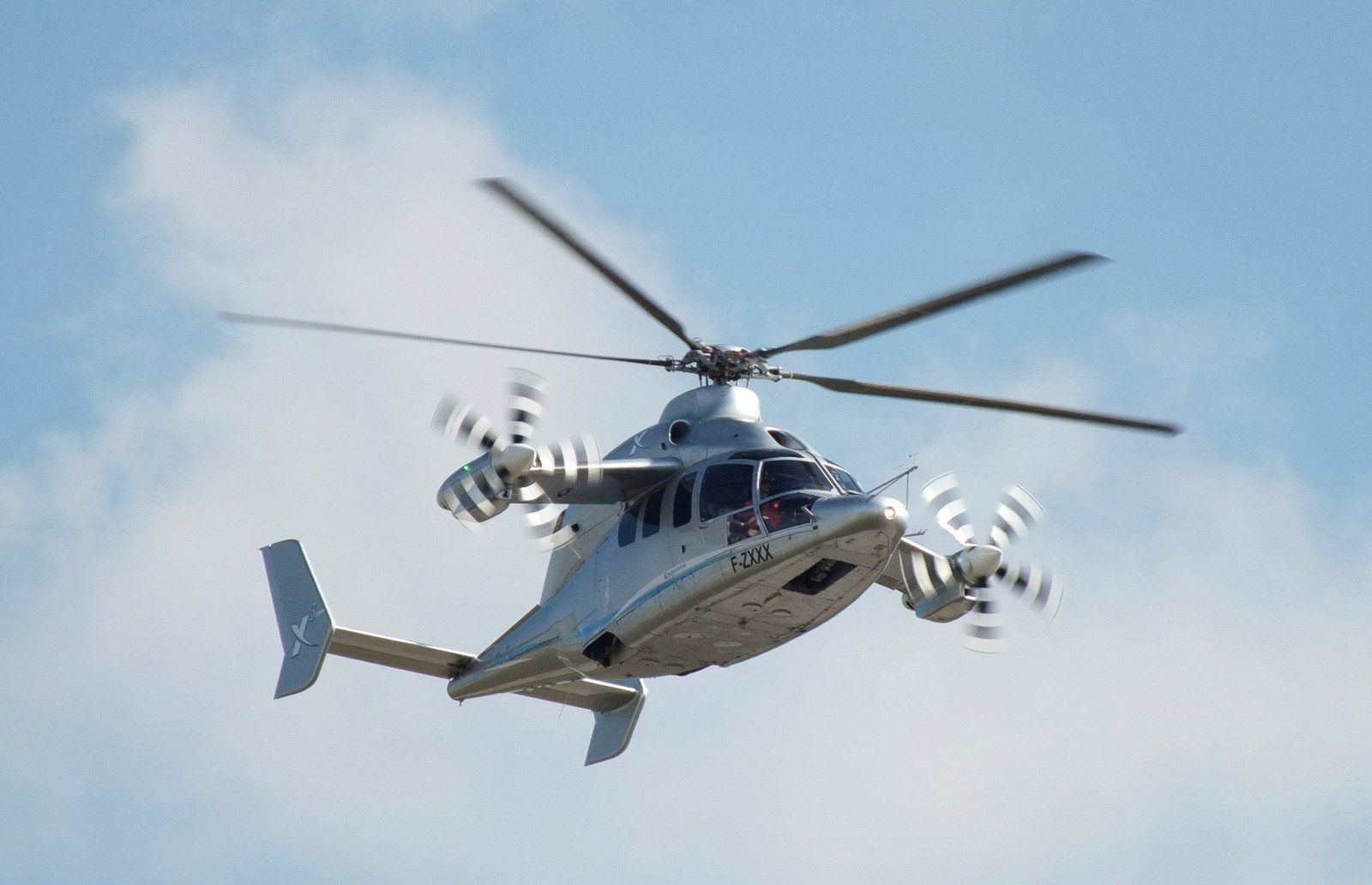
The RACER builds on the Eurocopter X³ experience

On 20 June 2017 at the Paris air show, Airbus Helicopters revealed a high-speed demonstrator configuration based on the X3 developed within the Clean Sky 2 research programme. Its aerodynamic configuration was validated in 2017. In February 2018, the 2,500 hp (1,900 kW) Safran Aneto-1X power plant was selected over the RTM322 initially selected, it is 25% more compact for the same power.

By October 2018, design of key subsystems was completed before the first components started manufacturing with long-lead items, as the lateral drive shaft production began. GE's Avio Aero in Italy launched procurement and manufacturing of the lateral gear boxes housings, GE Aviation Systems in UK is building the wing's titanium cradle, INCAS/Romaero in Romania started the design and manufacturing the hybrid structure (metal & composite) of the Main Fuselage and the Firewalls and Aernnova in Spain the tail parts primary structure.

The flight demonstration should expand the flight envelope and assess performance, before demonstrating missions like EMS, SAR and private transport, while developing low-noise flight procedures. Final assembly was due to start in mid-2020 for a first flight in the fourth quarter of 2021 however, primarily due to COVID-19 pandemic-related delays, only 50% of the components were completed by the spring of 2021. The final component, the gearbox, was expected to be delivered in Q1 2022 for ground testing and installation, with first flight anticipated at the beginning of Q2 in 2022. It only arrived in March 2023 while powered systems testing and taxi trials however had begun in December 2022.

It made its first flight on 25 April 2024 in Marignane. By its third test flight in May, it had performed aggressive manoeuvres and reached 165 kn (306 km/h), using 300 kW (400 hp) less power than a conventional helicopter, while both engines were at 50% torque at 160 kn (300 km/h). It should reach 220 kn (410 km/h) later in 2024 and the “eco-mode” with one engine shut down in cruise should be flight tested in 2025, along with mission demonstrations.

On 28 April 2025, the compound rotorcraft reached its 240 kn (444 km/h) in level flight after 25 flight hours since April 2024, after having reached 260 kn (480 km/h) in a descent the previous summer. It can perform 2g turns at 190 kn (350 km/h). Passenger-carrying demonstration flights are planned once “eco-mode” is enabled before 2025 ends, in missions like air transport, air ambulance, and search and rescue.

== Design ==
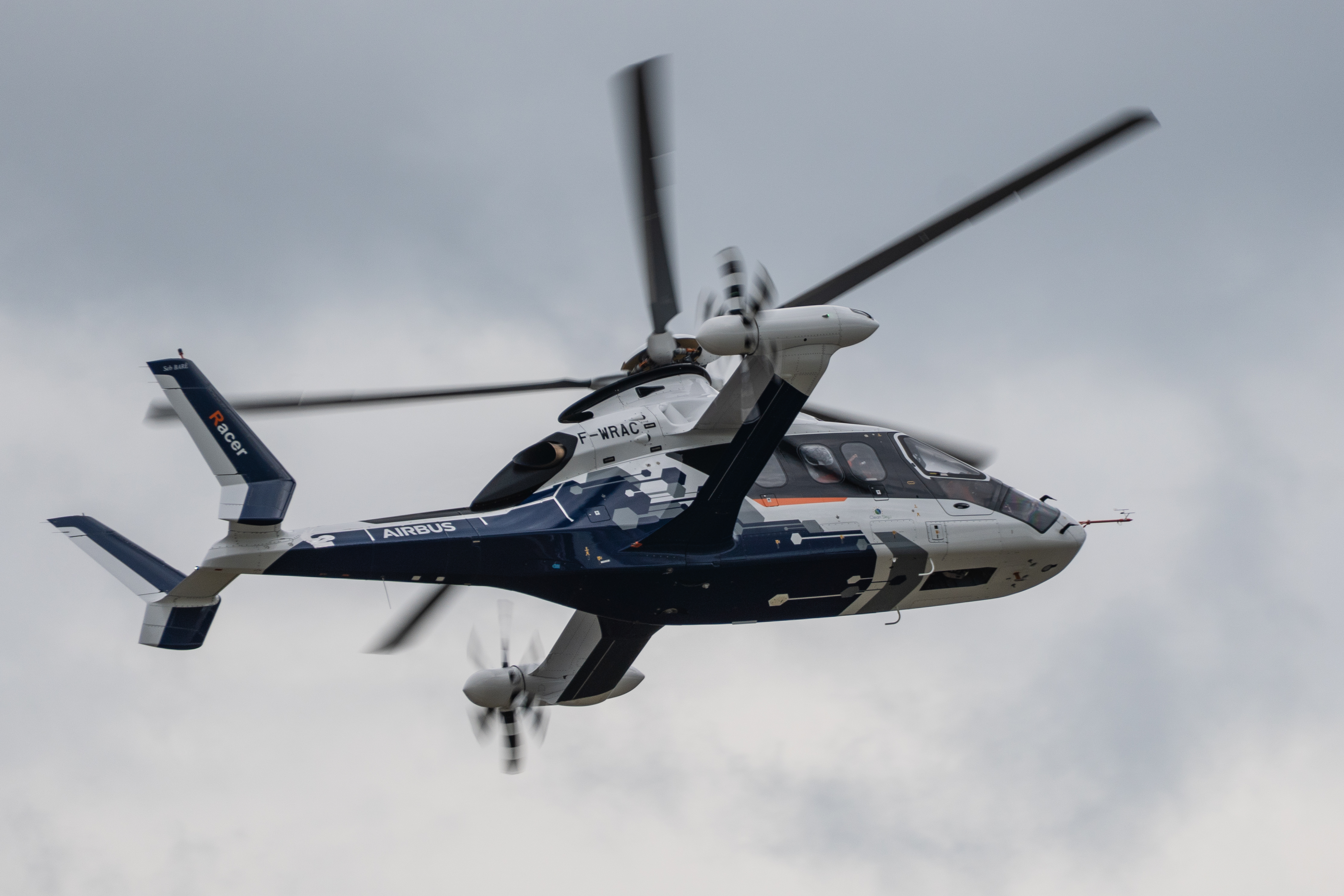
RACER in flight at ILA Berlin 2026

Optimised for a cruise over 400 km/h (216 kn), 50% faster than a conventional helicopter, it will consume 15% less fuel per distance at 180 kn (333 km/h) than a helicopter at 130 kn (241 km/h), and aim for a 25% cost reduction per distance. The lateral pusher propellers generate thrust and are isolated from passengers during ground operations by the box wings which serve to generate lift at cruise velocity. This allows the main rotor to be slowed by up to 15% as the craft's air speed increases and prevents the rotor blades breaking the sound barrier which would reduce performance. Driven by two engines, of which one is capable of shutting down and restarting once inflight to save fuel and increase range, it will have a low weight and low maintenance hybrid metallic-composite airframe and lower weight high voltage direct current electrical generation.

The Racer uses a standard main rotor from an Airbus H175 super-medium-twin. In cruise flight, the V-shaped box-wing provides around half of the lift permitting the main rotor to be slowed, removing the retreating blade stall instability of a traditional helicopter, as it receives 20-25% of the torque and the lateral pusher propellers generates the majority of the propulsion. The compound propulsion could allow optimized departure and arrival trajectories for a 30% lower noise footprint than a usual helicopter.

== Specifications ==
Data from Flight

General characteristics

- Crew: 2
- Capacity: ~10 passengers
- Max takeoff weight: 8,000–9,000 kg (17,637–19,842 lb)
- Powerplant: 2 × Safran Aneto-1X turboshaft engines, 1,900 kW (2,500 hp) each
- Propellers: 6-bladed (two pusher propellers gear driven from main engines).

Performance

- Cruise speed: 444 km/h (276 mph, 240 kn) , 180 kn (330 km/h) with only one engine
- Range: 740 km (460 mi, 400 nmi)

== See also ==
- Fairey Rotodyne
- Sikorsky S-97

Related development

- Eurocopter X³

Aircraft of comparable role, configuration, and era

- Kamov Ka-92
- Piasecki X-49
- Sikorsky X2

Related lists

- List of rotorcraft
