= Dynamic stall on helicopter rotors =

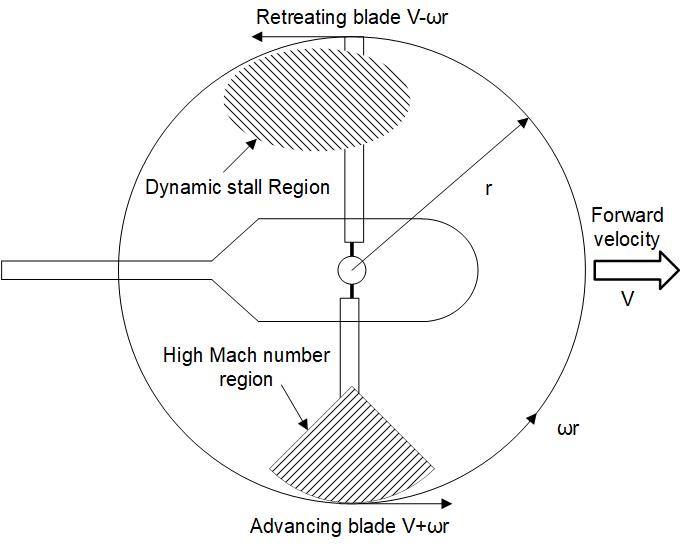
Dynamic stall region

The dynamic stall is one of the hazardous phenomena on helicopter rotors, which can cause the onset of large torsional airloads and vibrations on the rotor blades. Unlike fixed-wing aircraft, of which the stall occurs at relatively low flight speed, the dynamic stall on a helicopter rotor emerges at high airspeeds or/and during manoeuvres with high load factors of helicopters, when the angle of attack(AOA) of blade elements varies intensively due to time-dependent blade flapping, cyclic pitch and wake inflow. For example, during forward flight at the velocity close to V_{NE}, velocity, never exceed, the advancing and retreating blades almost reach their operation limits whereas flows are still attached to the blade surfaces. That is, the advancing blades operate at high Mach numbers so low values of AOA is needed but shock-induced flow separation may happen, while the retreating blade operates at much lower Mach numbers but the high values of AoA result in the stall (also see advancing blade compressibility and retreating blade stall).

== Performance limits ==
The effect of dynamic stall limits the helicopter performance in several ways such as:

- The maximum forward flight velocity and thrust;
- High blade structural loads, which may result in excessive vibrations and blade structural damage;
- Control system loads, manoeuvre capability, and handling qualities;
- Helicopter dynamic performance.

== Flow topology ==
The visualization is considered a vivid method to better understand the aerodynamic principle of the dynamic stall on a helicopter rotor, and the investigation generally starts from the analysis of the unsteady motion on 2D airfoil (see Blade element theory).

=== Dynamic stall for 2D airfoils ===
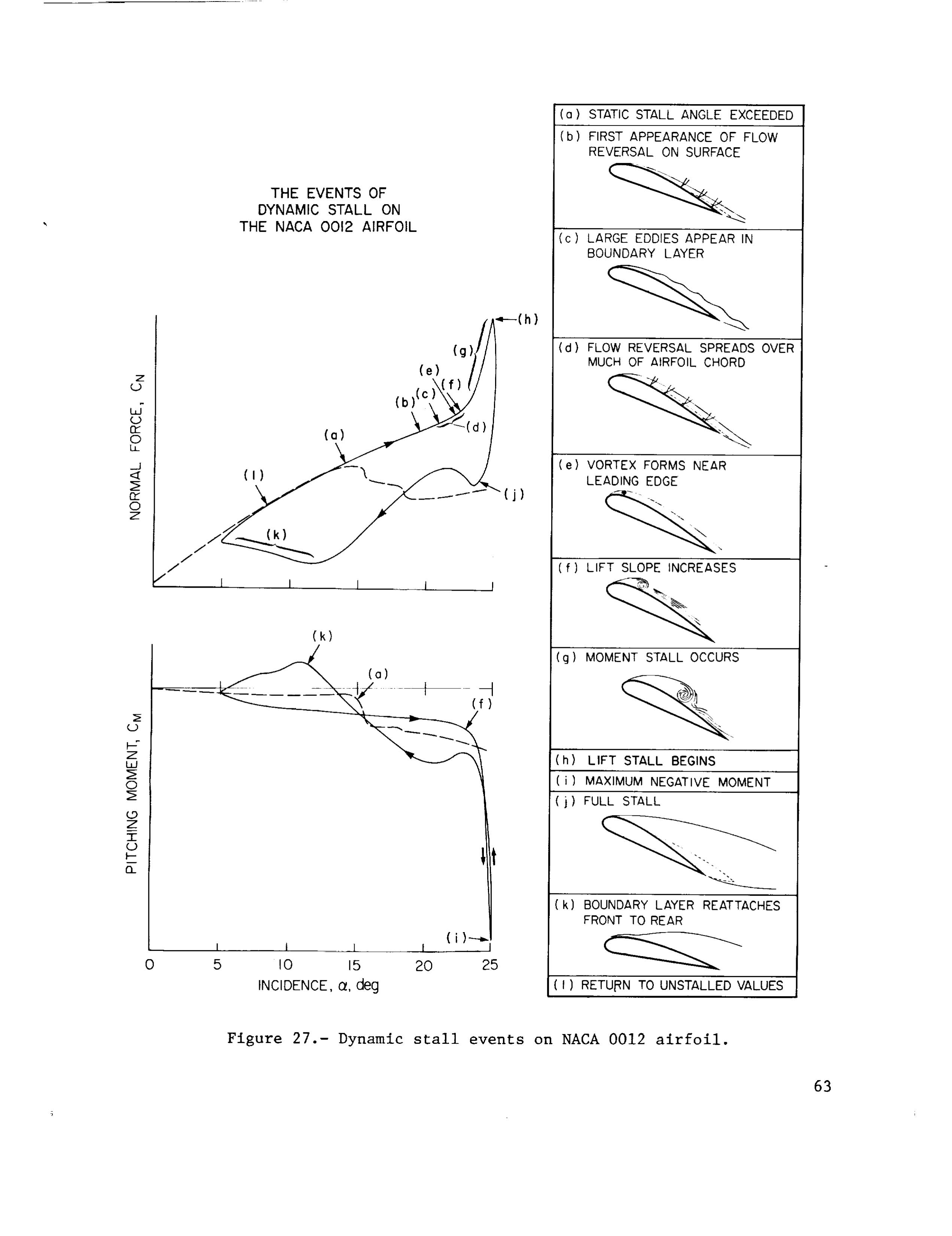
The events of dynamic stall on the NACA0012 airfoil

By wind tunnel experiments, it has been found that the behavior of an airfoil under unsteady motion is quite different from that under quasi-steady motion. Flow separation is less likely to happen on the upper airfoil surface with a larger value of AoA than the latter, which can increase the maximum lift coefficient to a certain extent. Three primary unsteady phenomena have been identified to contribute to the delay in the onset of flow separation under unsteady condition:

- During the condition where the AoA is increasing with respect to time, the unsteadiness of the flow resulting from circulation that is shed into the wake at the trailing edge of the airfoil causes a reduction in the lift and adverse pressure gradients compared to the steady case at the same AoA;
- By virtue of a kinematic induced camber effect, a positive pitch rate further decreases the leading edge pressure and pressure gradients for a given value of lift;
- In response to the external pressure gradients, there are also additional unsteady effects that occur within the boundary layer, including the existence of flow reversals in the absence of any significant flow separation.

The development process of dynamic stall on 2D airfoil can be summarized in several stages:

- Stage 1: the AoA exceeds the static stall angle but the flow separation is delayed due to the reduction of adverse pressure gradients produced by the kinematics of pitch rate.
- Stage 2: flow separation and the formation of a vortex disturbance is cast-off from the leading edge region of the airfoil. This vortex, called leading edge vortex (LEV) or dynamic stall vortex (DSV), provides an additional lift for the airfoil so long as it stays over the upper surface, and also noteworthy increases in nose-down pitching moment (moment break, moment stall) while it moves downstream across the chord.
- Stage 3: a steep decrease of the lift coefficient (lift break, lift stall) occurs as the DSV passes into the wake.

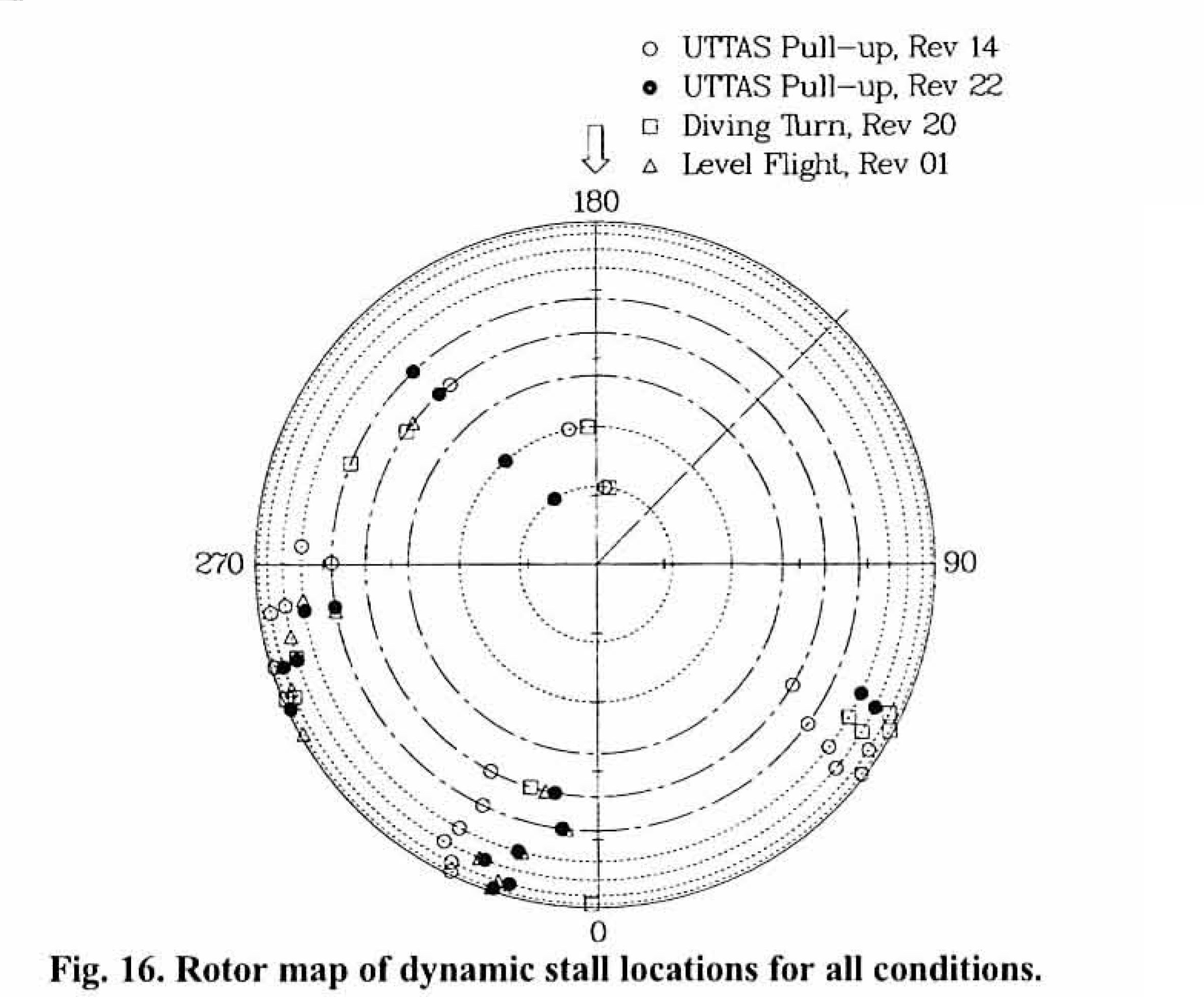
Rotor map of dynamic stall locations for all conditions

- Stage 4: full separation of the flow on the upper surface of the airfoil can be observed, accompanied by the peak of nose-down pitch moment.
- Stage 5: the full flow reattachment is achieved as the AoA gradually decreases until it is fairly smaller than the static stall angle. The reasons for the lag are, firstly, the reorganization of the flow from fully separated to reattached, and secondly, the reverse kinematic "induced camber" effect on the leading edge pressure gradient by the negative pitch rate.

=== Dynamic stall in the rotor environment ===
Although the unsteady mechanism of idealized 2D experiments has already been studied comprehensively, the dynamic stall on a rotor presents strong three-dimensional character differences. According to a well-collected in-flight data by Bousman, the generation location of the DSV is "tightly grouped", where lift overshoots and large nose-down pitching moments are featured and can be classified into three groups.

== Types ==
=== Light dynamic stall ===
- Minor flow separation;
- Low deviations of airloads and small hysteresis;
- The same order of the viscous zone thickness as the airfoil thickness;
- Sensitivity to airfoil geometry, reduced frequency and Mach number.

=== Deep dynamic stall ===
- Domination of the vortex-shedding phenomenon;
- High deviations of airloads and large hysteresis;
- Extension of the viscous zone to the order of airfoil chord;
- Less sensitivity to airfoil geometry, reduced frequency and Mach number;
- Rapid overshoots of airloads after stall.

== Factors ==
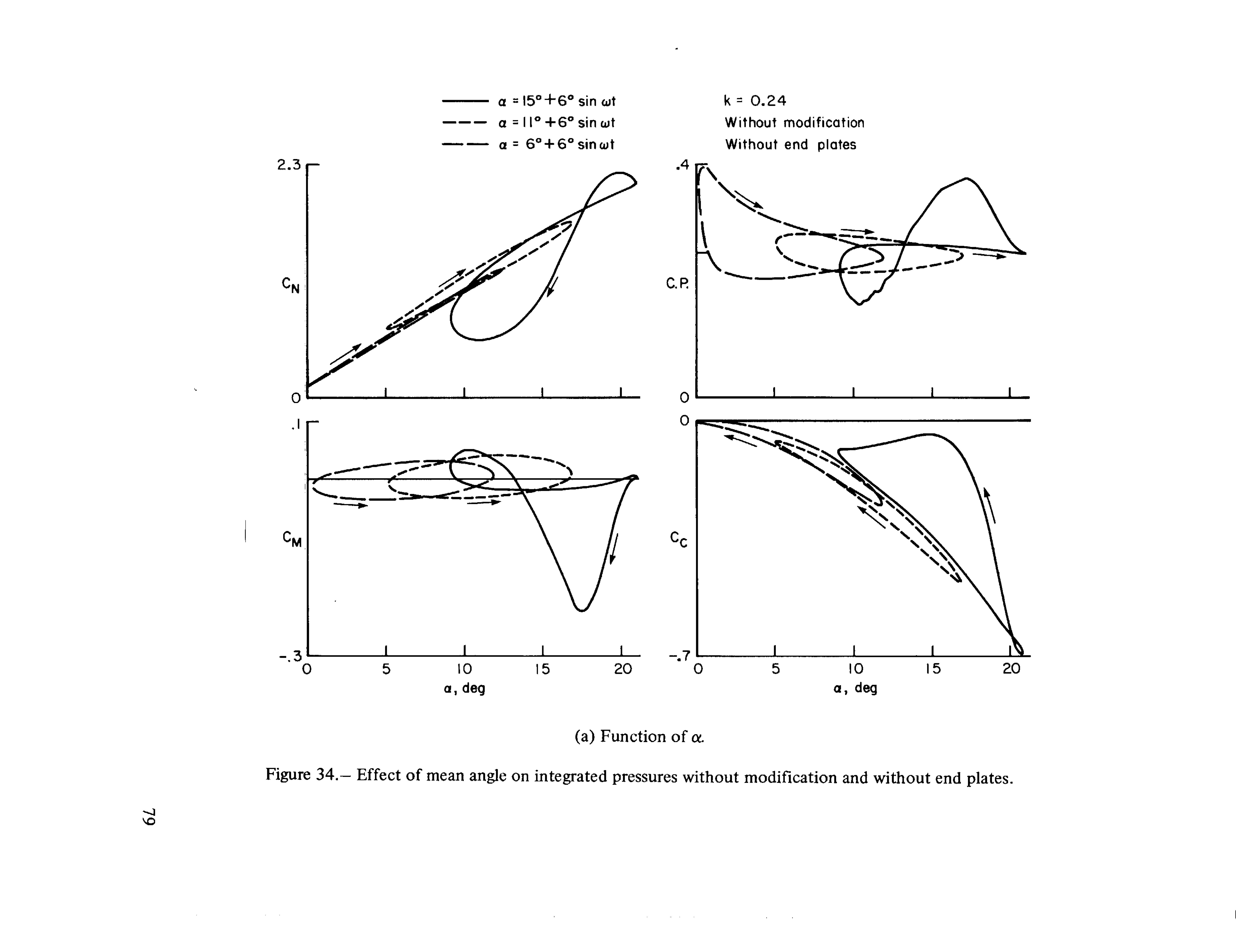
Effect of mean AoA on dynamic stall

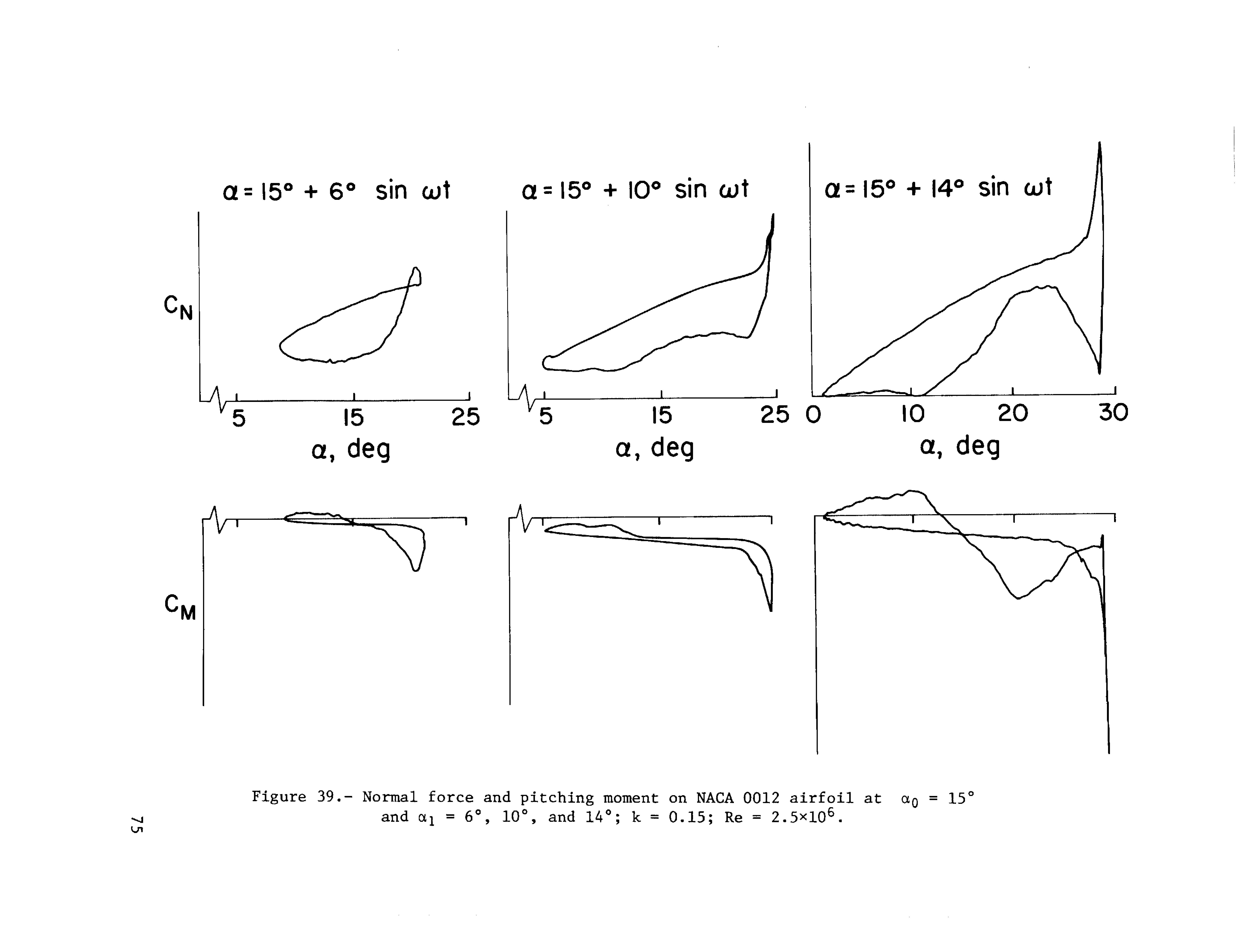
Effect of oscillating angle on dynamic stall

=== Mean AoA ===
The increasing of the mean value of AoA leads to more evident flow separation, higher overshoots of lift and pitch moment, and larger airloads hysteresis, which may ultimately result in deep dynamic stall.

=== Oscillating angle ===
The amplitude of oscillation is also an important parameter for the stall behaviour of an airfoil. With a larger oscillating angle, deep dynamic stall tends to occur.

=== Reduced frequency ===
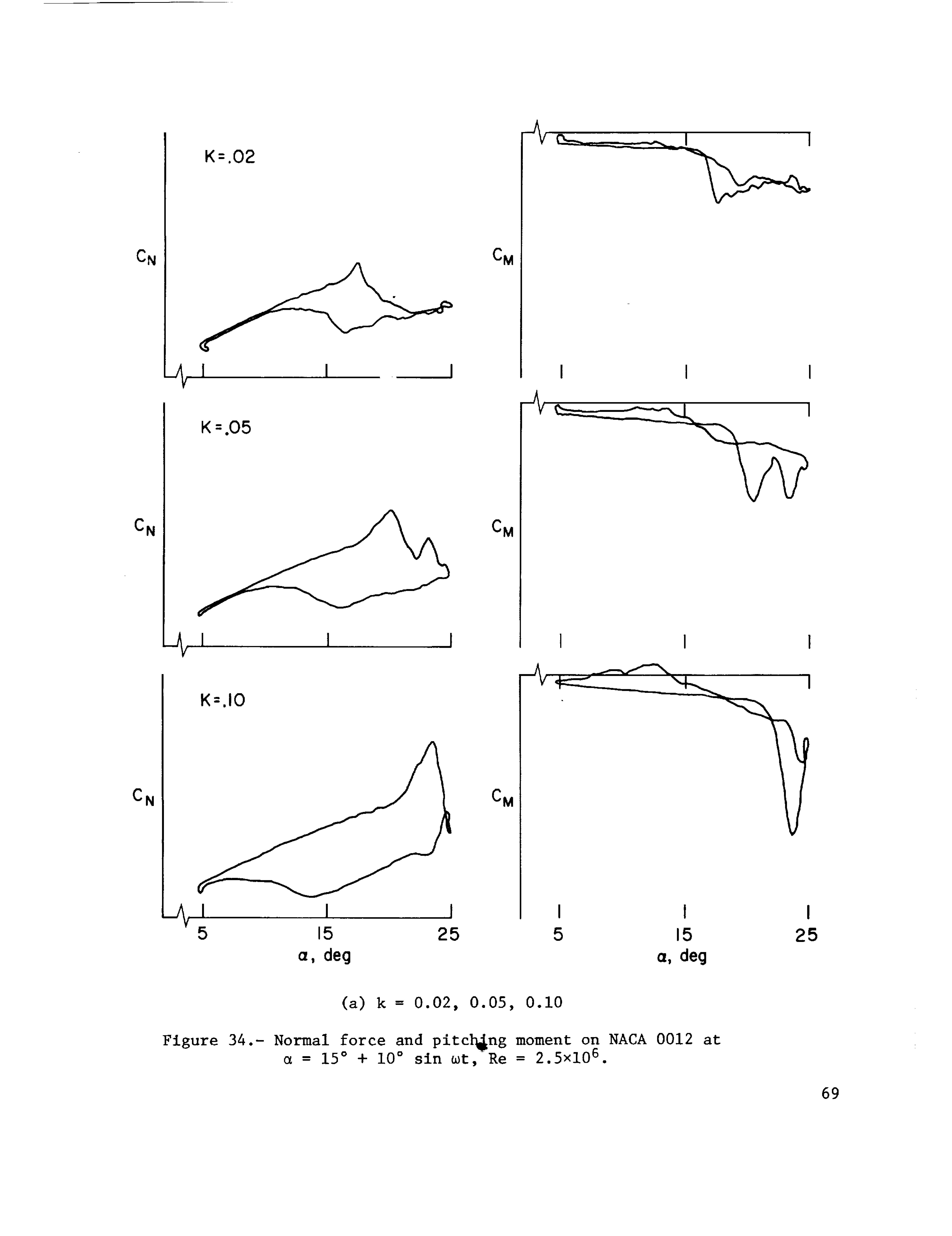
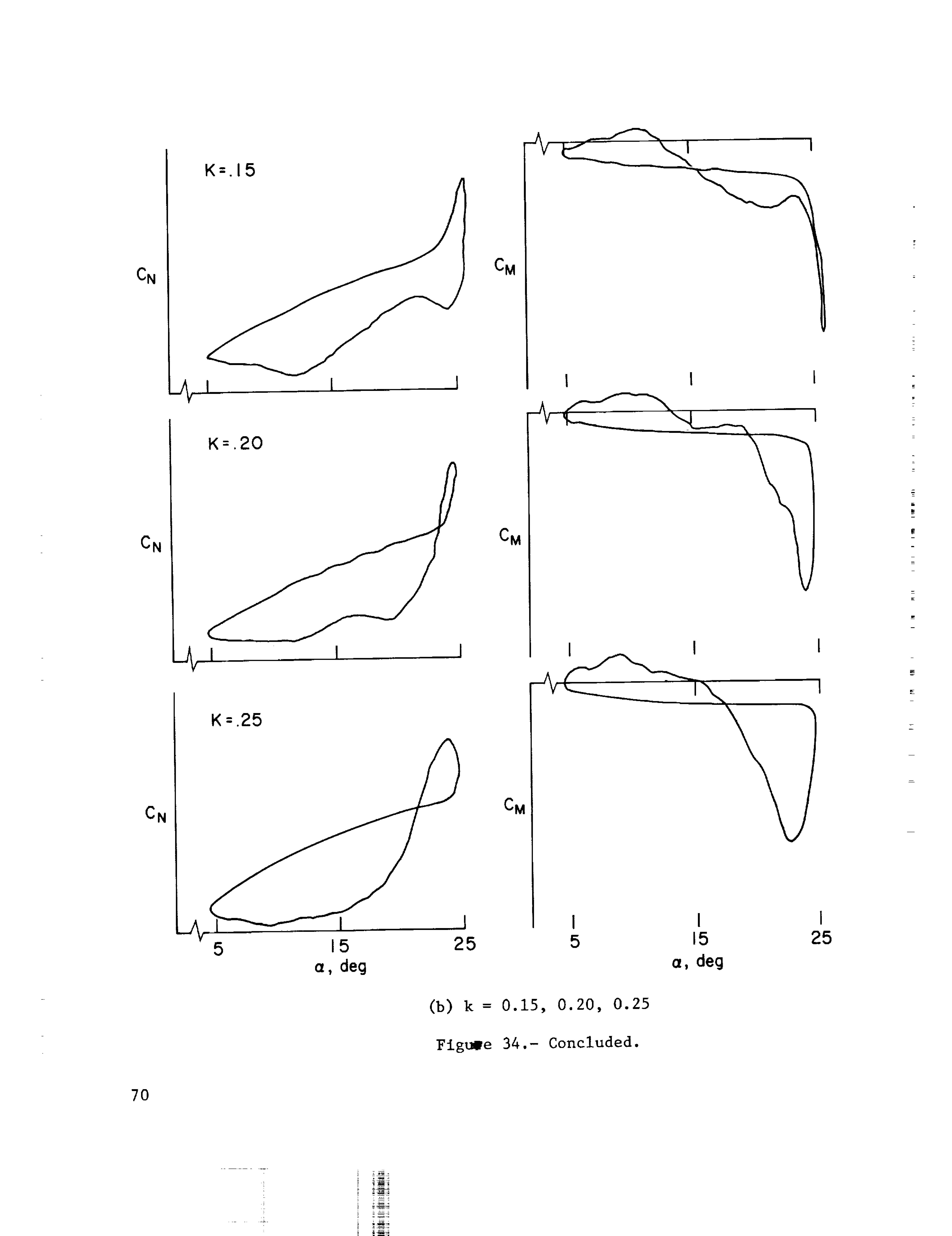
Effect of reduced frequency on dynamic stall

A higher value of reduced frequency $k$ suggests a delay of the onset of flow separation at higher AoA, and a reduction of airloads overshoots and hysteresis is secured because of the increase of the kinematic induced camber effect. But when reduce frequency is rather low, i.e. $k < 0.05$, the vortex-shedding phenomenon is not likely to happen, so does the deep dynamic stall.

=== Airfoil geometry ===
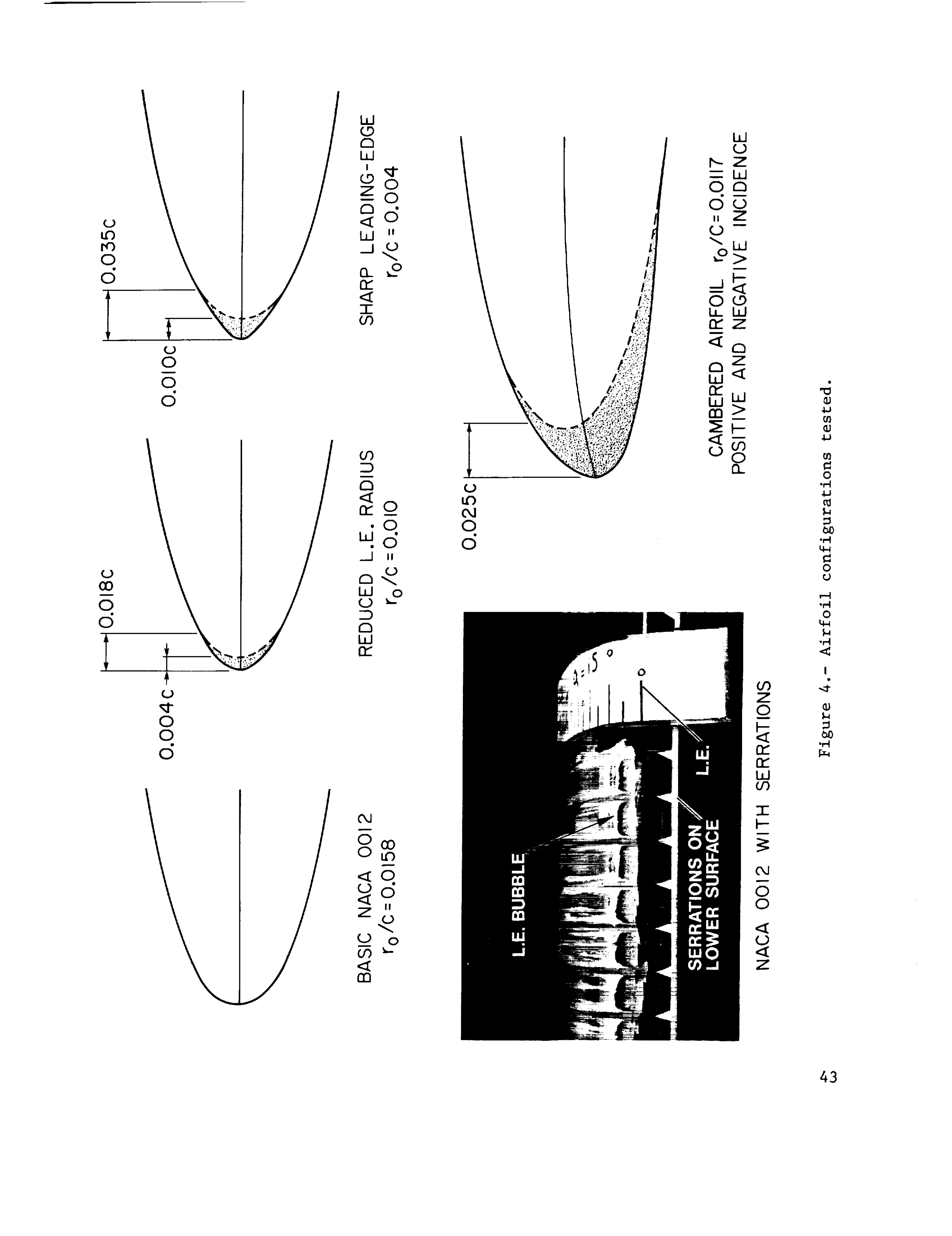
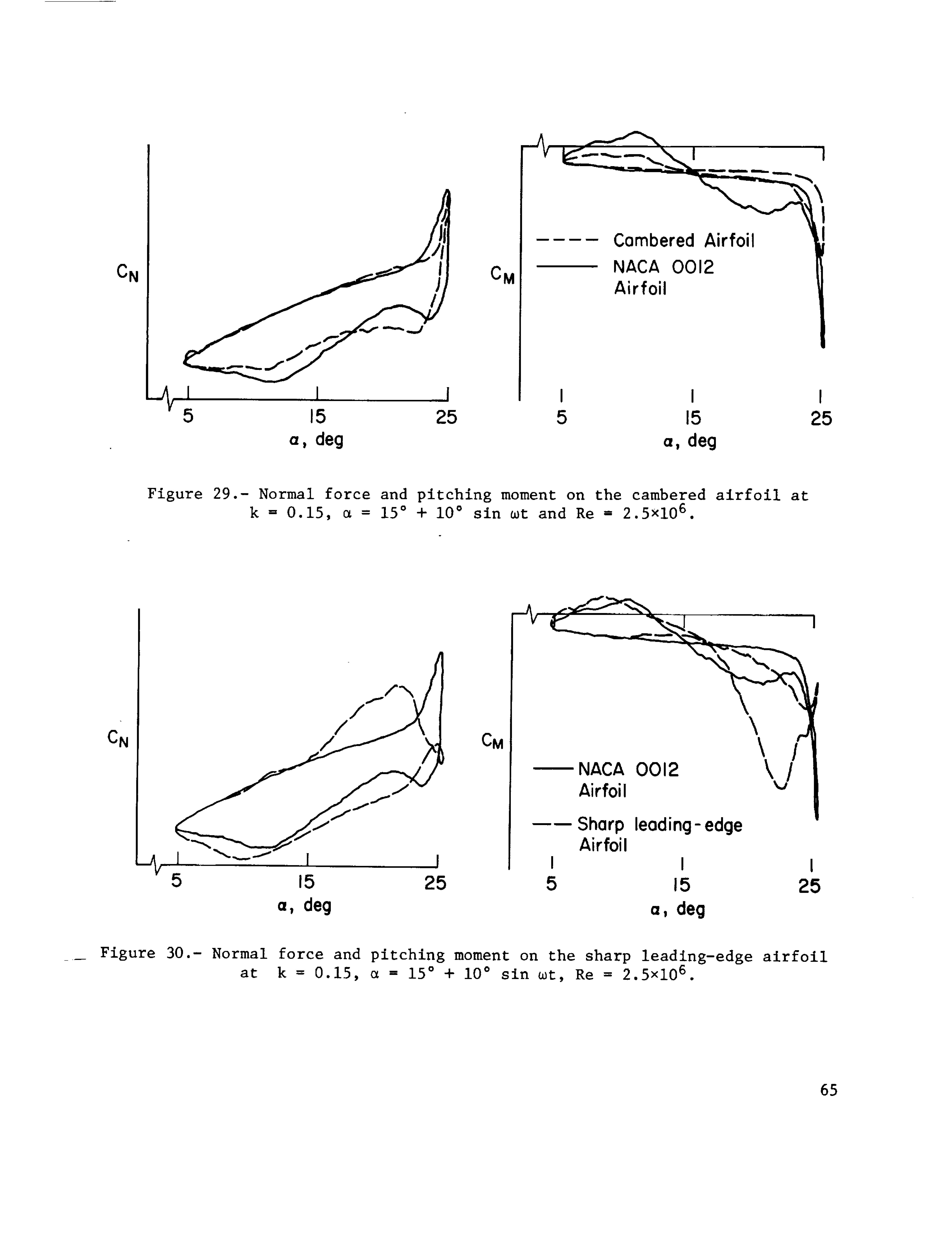
Effect of airfoil geometry on dynamic stall

The effect of airfoil geometry on dynamic stall is quite intricate. As is shown in the figure, for a cambered airfoil, the lift stall is delayed and the maximum nose-down pitch moment is significantly reduced. On the other hand, the inception of stall is more abrupt for a sharp leading-edge airfoil. More information is available here.

=== Sweep angle ===
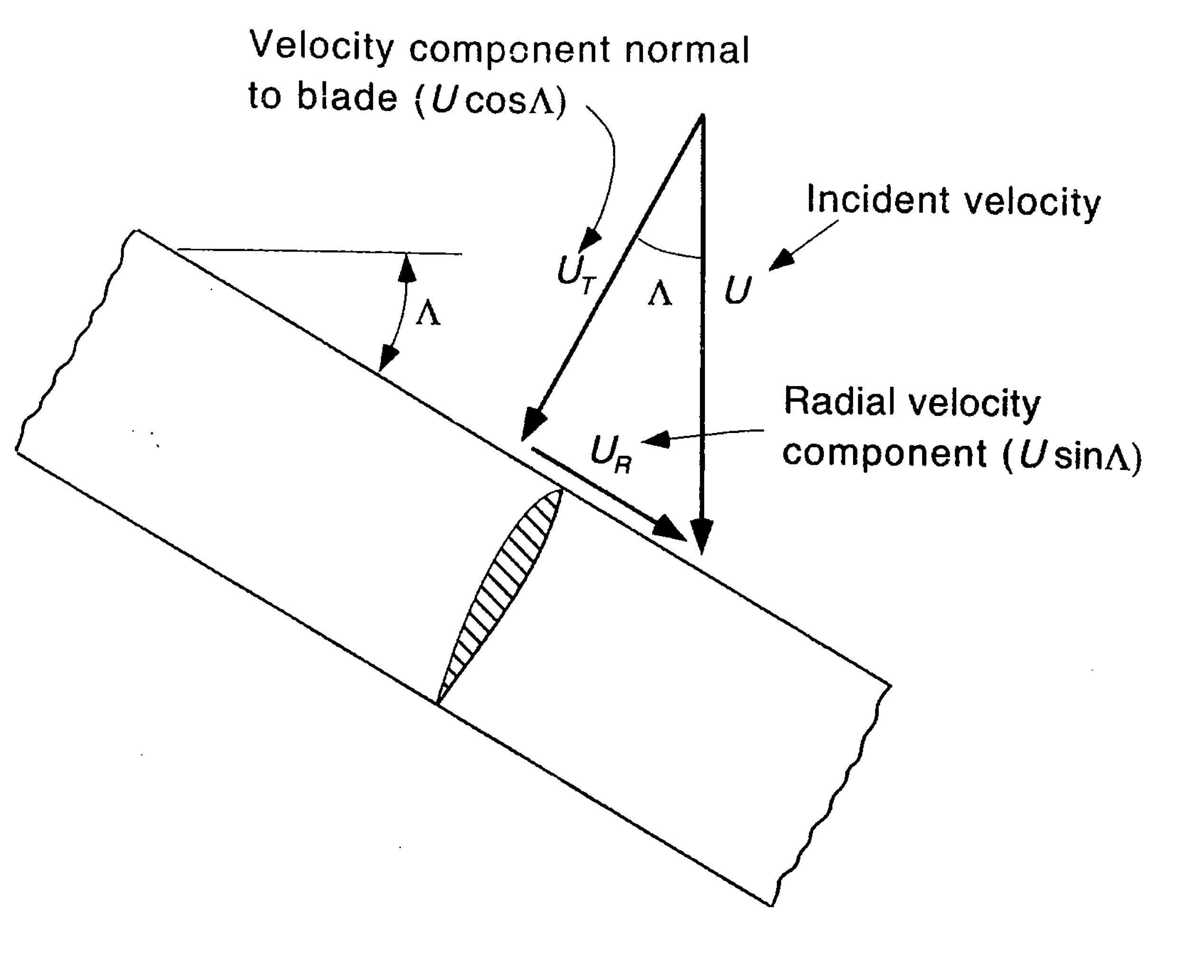
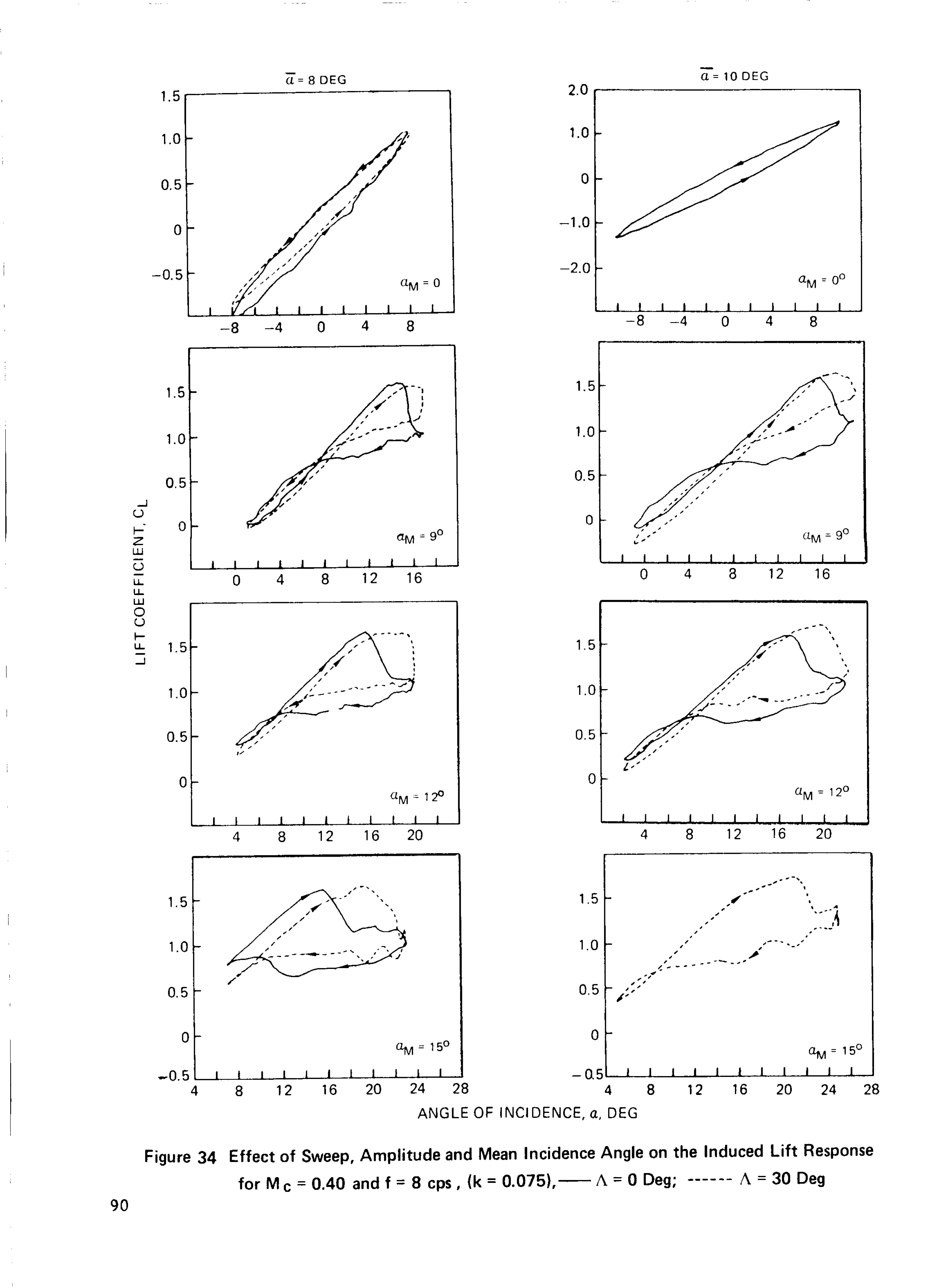
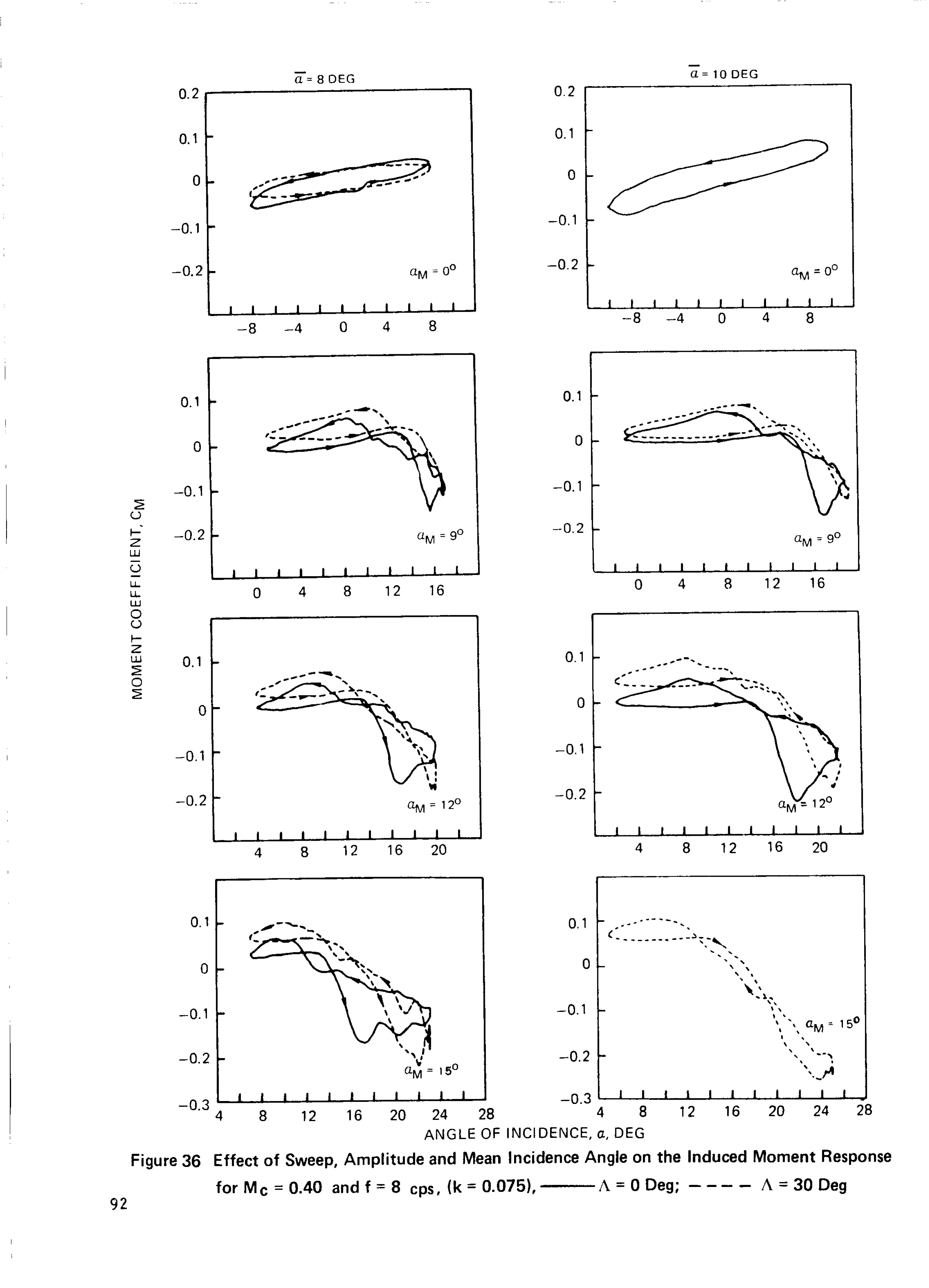
Effect of sweep angle on dynamic stall

The sweep angle of the flow to a blade element for a helicopter in forward flight can be significant. It is defined as the radial component of the velocity relative to the leading edge of the blade:

$$\Lambda=\arctan{\frac{U_R}{U_T}}=\arctan{\frac{\mu \cos{\psi}}{r+\sin{\psi}}}$$

Based on experimental data, a sweep angle of 30° is able to delay the onset of stall to a higher AoA thanks to the convection of the leading-edge vortex at a lower velocity and reduce the varying rate of lift, pitch moment, and the scale of hysteresis loops.

=== Reynolds number ===
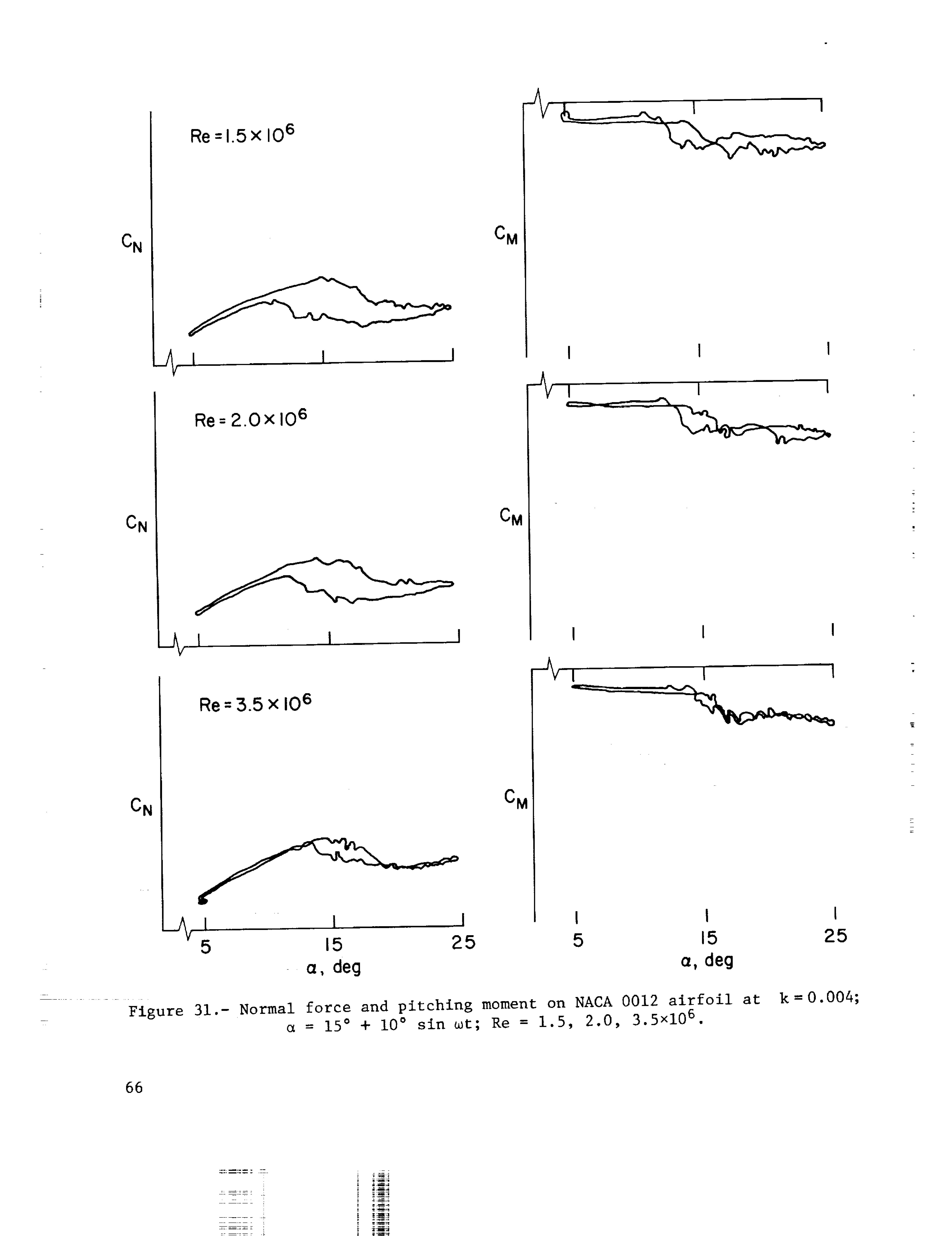
Effect of Reynolds numbers on dynamic stall

As the figure suggests, the effect of Reynolds numbers seems to be minor, with a low value of reduced frequency k=0.004, stall overshoot is minimal and most of the hysteresis loop is attributable to a delay in reattachment, rather than vortex shedding.

=== Three-dimensional effects ===
Lorber et al. found that at the outermost wing station, the existence of the tip vortex gives both the steady and unsteady lift and pitching moment hysteresis loops a more nonlinear quasi-steady behaviour due to an element of steady vortex-induced lift, while for the rest of the wing stations where oscillations below stall, there is no particular difference from 2-D cases.

=== Time-varying velocity ===
During forward flight, the blade element of a rotor will encounter a time-varying incident velocity, leading to additional unsteady aerodynamic characters. Several features have been discovered through experiments, for example, depending on the phasing of the velocity variations with respect to the AoA, initiation of LEV shedding and the chordwise convection of LEV appear to be different. However, more works are needed to better understand this problem adopting mathematical models.

== Modelling ==
There are mainly two types of mathematical models to predict the dynamic stall behaviour: semi-empirical models and computational fluid dynamics method. With regard to the latter method, because of the sophisticated flow field during the process of the dynamic stall, the full Navier-Stokes equations and proper models are adopted, and some promising results have been presented in the literature. However, to utilize this method precisely, proper turbulence models and transition models should be carefully selected. Furthermore, this method is also sometimes too computationally costly for research purposes as well as the pre-design of a helicopter rotor. On the other hand, to date some semi-empirical models have shown their capability of providing adequate precision, which contains sets of linear and nonlinear equations, based on classical unsteady thin-airfoil theory and parameterized by empirical coefficients. Therefore, a large number of experimental results are demanded to correct the empirical coefficients, and it is foreseeable that these models cannot be generally adapted to a wide range of conditions such as different airfoils, Mach numbers, and so on.

Here, two typical semi-empirical methods are presented to give insights into the modelling of dynamic stall.

=== Boeing-Vertol Gamma Function Method ===
The model was initially developed by Gross&Harris and Gormont, the basic idea is as follows:

The onset of dynamic stall is assumed to occur at $\alpha_{DS}=\alpha_{SS}+\Delta\alpha_D$,

where $\alpha_{DS}$ is the critical AoA of dynamic stall, $\alpha_{SS}$ is static stall AoA and $\Delta\alpha_D$ is given by

$\Delta\alpha_D=\gamma \sqrt{\dot{\alpha} c/V_\infty}$,

where $\dot{\alpha}$ is the time derivative of AoA, $c$ is the blade chord, and $V_\infty$ is the free-stream velocity. The $\gamma$ function is empirical, depends on geometry and Mach number and is different for lift and pitching moment.

The airloads coefficients are constructed from static data using an equivalent angle of attack $\alpha_{eq}$ derived from Theodorsen's theory at the appropriate reduced frequency of the forcing and a reference angle $\alpha_r=\alpha \pm \gamma \sqrt{\dot{\alpha} c/V_\infty}$ as follows:

$C_L=\frac{\alpha_{eq}}{\alpha_r}C_L(\alpha_r)$, $C_D=C_D(\alpha_r)$, $C_M=(0.25-x_{CP})C_L(\alpha_r)$, where $x_{CP}$ is the center point of rotation.

A comprehensive analysis of a helicopter rotor using this model is presented in the reference.

=== Leishman-Beddoes Method ===
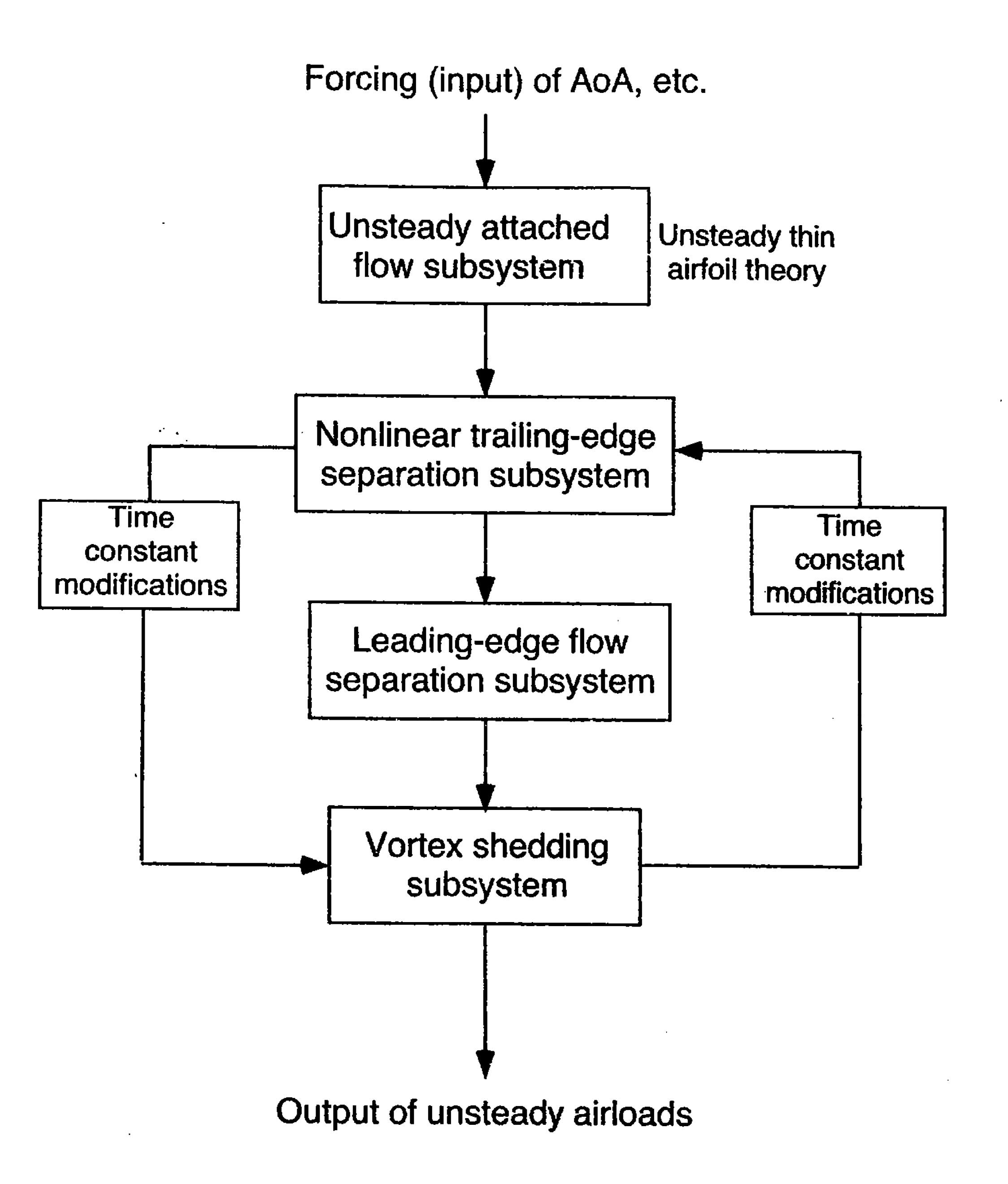
Flowchart of Leishman-Beddoes dynamic stall model

The model was initially developed by Beddoes and Leishman&Beddoes and refined by Leishman and Tyler&Leishman.

The model consists of three distinct sub-systems for describing the dynamic stall physics:

- Attached flow model for the unsteady (linear) airloads (with compressibility effects included) using the compressible indicial response functions;
- Separated flow model for the nonlinear airloads (Kirchhoff-Helmholtz theory);
- Dynamic stall model for the leading edge vortex-induced airloads.

One significant advantage of the model is that it uses relatively few empirical coefficients, with all but four at each Mach number being derived from static airfoil data.

== See also ==
- helicopter
- Rotorcraft
- Helicopter rotor
- Stall (fluid dynamics)
- Retreating blade stall
- Reduced frequency
- Lift coefficient
- Angle of attack
