= Kamov Ka-92 =

Type of aircraft

Ka-92
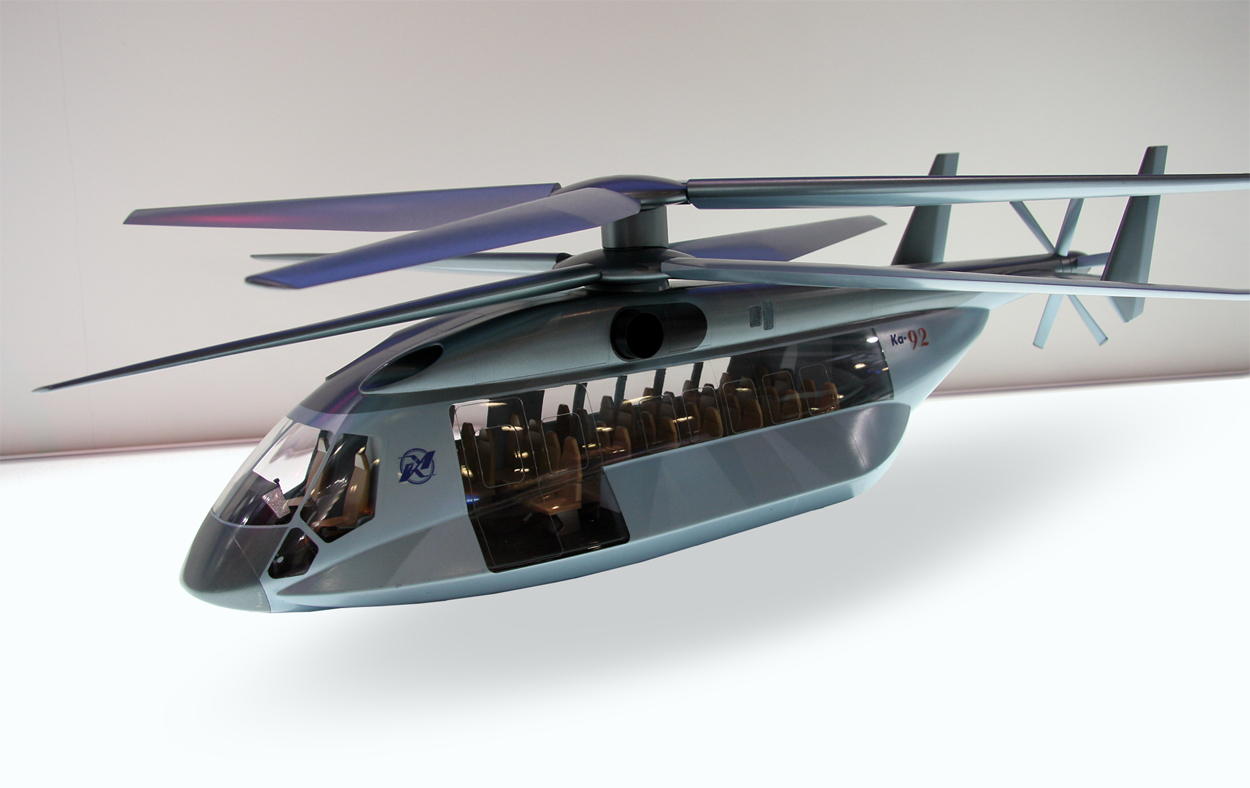
- A model of Kamov Ka-92 helicopter at HeliRussia 2009 exhibition.

General information
- Type: Co-axial rotor high-speed transport helicopter
- National origin: Russia
- Manufacturer: Kamov / Russian Helicopters
- Status: Design study for competition

The Kamov Ka-92 is a high-speed coaxial compound helicopter design proposed by Kamov of Russia in competition with the Mil Moscow Helicopter Plant for a $1.3 billion project by the Russian government for development of a high-speed helicopter.

== Design and development ==
The Kamov Ka-92 is part of a program of the newly established Russian Helicopters company, intended to create a new generation of medium-class helicopters capable of cruising at about 500 km/h (312 mph) and flying over a distance of up to 1400 km. Its preliminary design and some specification data were unveiled at the HeliRussia 2009 exhibition near Moscow.

The Ka-92 will feature a coaxial rotor system which is distinctive of Kamov products. As on the Mil Mi-X1, a pusher propeller will be used on the Ka-92, but the Kamov will use two instead of one as Mil has chosen. As Kamov Chief Designer Sergey Mikheev explained, the traditional design when the main rotor both lifts and pushes the aircraft forward functions only up to a speed of about 300 km/h due to retreating blade stall. "Now we plan to split the functions of horizontal and vertical flights between different rotors", said Mikheev.

The Ka-92 is planned as a 30-seat passenger helicopter with a takeoff weight of 16 tons. According to Mikheev, the first prototype will be powered by two Klimov VK-2500 engines equipped with a new gearbox. However the designers plan to install more powerful 3,200 hp VK-3000 turboshafts as soon as the St. Petersburg-based Klimov Company finishes their development. With improved aerodynamics and two rear-mounted counterrotating pusher propellers, the Ka-92 is expected to reach a cruise speed of 420 to 430 km/h.

Development of the Mi-X1 and Ka-92 was switched from Ministry for Industry and Trade to Ministry of Defence in 2015 due to reduced government funding and high operating cost. A Russian Air Force general planned for a prototype to fly in 2018, with production in 2022.

== See also ==
Aircraft of comparable role, configuration, and era

- Eurocopter X3
- Kamov Ka-50
- Kamov Ka-90
- Mil Mi-X1
- Piasecki X-49
- Sikorsky S-97
- Sikorsky X2
