= Eurocopter X³ =

Experimental compound helicopter

X³
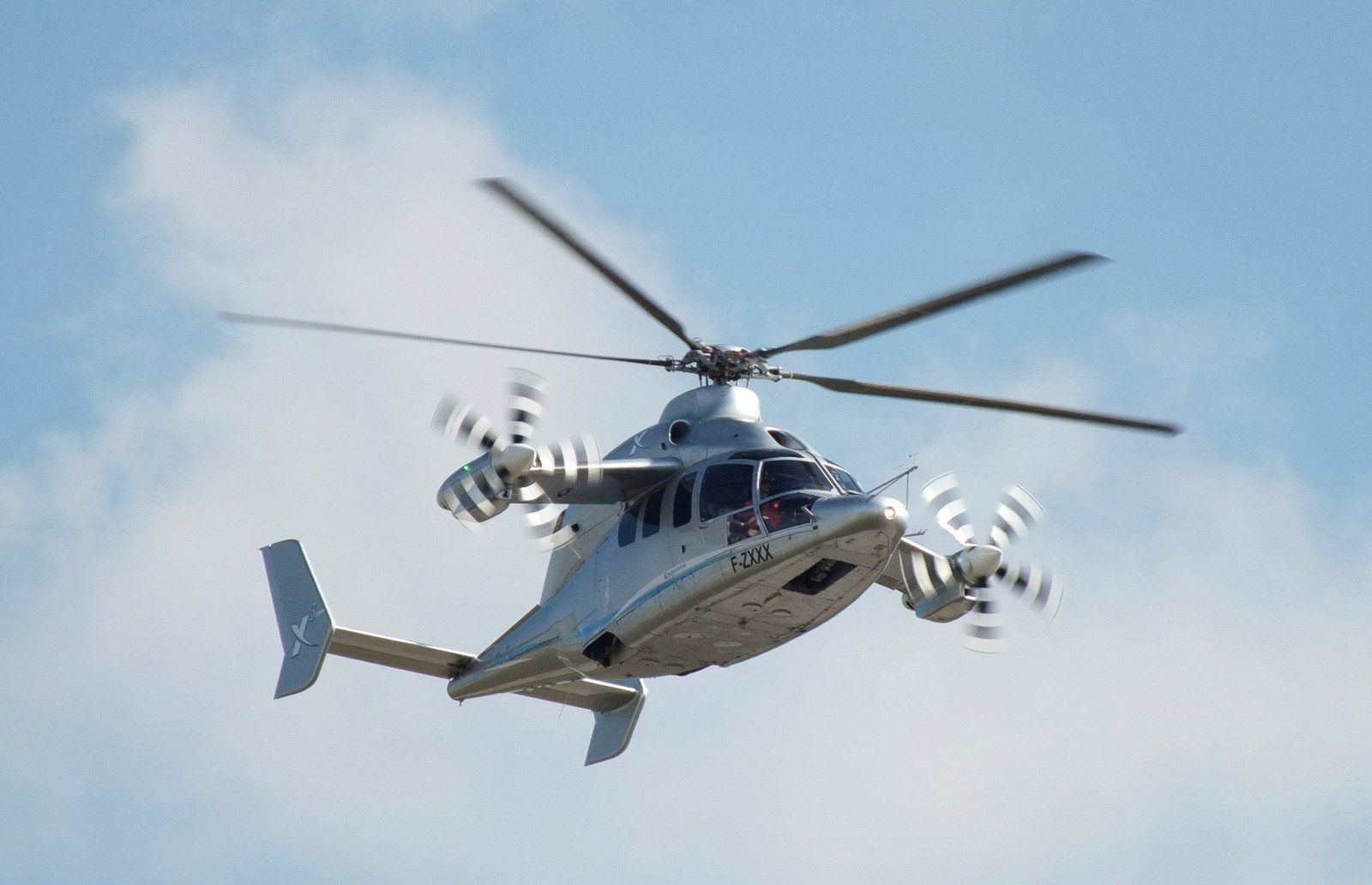
- Airbus Helicopters X³ in flight

General information
- Type: Experimental compound helicopter
- National origin: Multinational
- Manufacturer: Eurocopter; Airbus Helicopters
- Status: Retired
- Number built: 1

History
- First flight: 6 September 2010
- Developed from: Eurocopter AS365 Dauphin; Eurocopter EC155

The Eurocopter X³ (X-Cubed) is a retired experimental high-speed compound helicopter developed by Airbus Helicopters (formerly Eurocopter). A technology demonstration platform for "high-speed, long-range hybrid helicopter" or H³ concept, the X³ achieved 255 knots (472 km/h; 293 mph) in level flight on 7 June 2013, setting an unofficial helicopter speed record. In June 2014, it was placed in a French air museum in the village of Saint-Victoret.

== Design and development ==
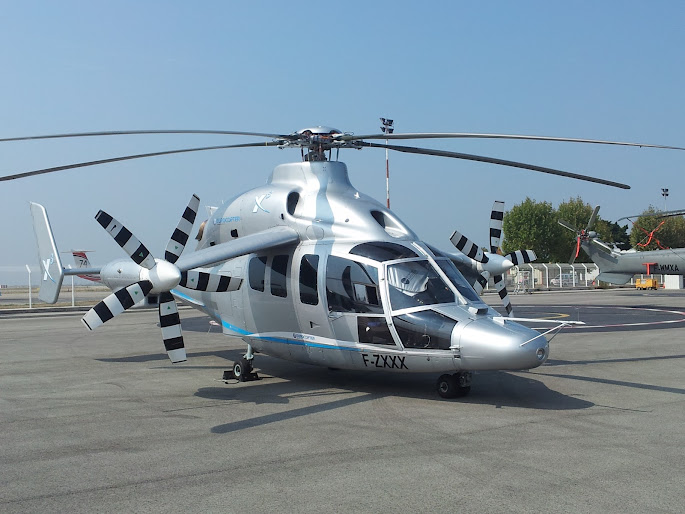
Eurocopter X³

=== Technology ===
The X³ demonstrator is based on the Eurocopter AS365 Dauphin helicopter, with the addition of short span wings each fitted with a tractor propeller, having a different pitch to counter the torque effect of the main rotor. Conventional helicopters use tail rotors to counter the torque effect. The tractor propellers are gear driven from the two main turboshaft engines which also drive the five-bladed main rotor system, taken from a Eurocopter EC155.

Test pilots describe the X³ flight as smooth, but the X³ does not have passive or active anti-vibration systems and can fly without stability augmentation systems, unlike the Sikorsky X2. The helicopter is designed to prove the concept of a high-speed helicopter which depends on slowing the rotor speed (by 15%) to avoid drag from the advancing blade tip, and to avoid retreating blade stall by unloading the rotor while a small wing provides 40–80% lift instead. The X³ can hover with a pitch attitude between minus 10 and plus 15 degrees. Its bank range is 40 degrees in hover, and is capable of flying at bank angles of 120 to 140 degrees. During testing the aircraft demonstrated a rate of climb of 5,500 feet per minute and high-G turn rates of 2Gs at 210 knots.

=== Performance ===
flying at the 2012 ILA Berlin Air Show

The X³ first flew on 6 September 2010 from French Direction générale de l'armement facility at Istres-Le Tubé Air Base.

On 12 May 2011 the X³ demonstrated a speed of 232 knots (267 mph; 430 km/h) while using less than 80 percent of available power.

In May 2012, it was announced that the Eurocopter X³ development team had received the American Helicopter Society's Howard Hughes Award for 2012.

Eurocopter demonstrated the X³ in the United States during the summer of 2012, the aircraft logging 55 flight hours, with a number of commercial and military operators being given the opportunity to fly the aircraft.

With an aerodynamic fairing installed on the rotor head, the X³ demonstrated a speed of 255 knots (293 mph; 472 km/h) in level flight and 263 knots (303 mph; 487 km/h) in a shallow dive on 7 June 2013, beating the Sikorsky X2's unofficial record set in September 2010, and thus becoming the world's fastest non-jet augmented compound helicopter.

=== Variants ===
Eurocopter suggested that a production H³ application could appear as soon as 2020. The company had also previously expressed an interest in offering an H³ technology based solution for the United States' Future Vertical Lift program, with EADS North America submitting bid to build a technology demonstrator under the US Army's Joint Multi Role (JMR) program, but later withdrew due to cost and because Eurocopter might have to transfer X³ intellectual property to the US, and Eurocopter chose to focus on the Armed Aerial Scout instead. Ultimately the company was not downselected for the JMR effort, and the AAS program was cancelled.

Eurocopter saw the offshore oil market and Search and rescue community as potential customers for X³ technology. An X³-based unpressurised compound helicopter called LifeRCraft is also among the projects planned under the European Union's €4 billion ($5.44 billion) Clean Sky 2 research program as one of two high-speed rotorcraft flight demonstrators. Airbus began development of the hybrid composite helicopter with a 4.6-litre V-8 piston engine in 2014, froze the design in 2016 to start building in 2017, and had plans to fly it in 2019.

The X³ was moved to Musée de l’air et de l’espace in 2014 for public display.

==== RACER ====
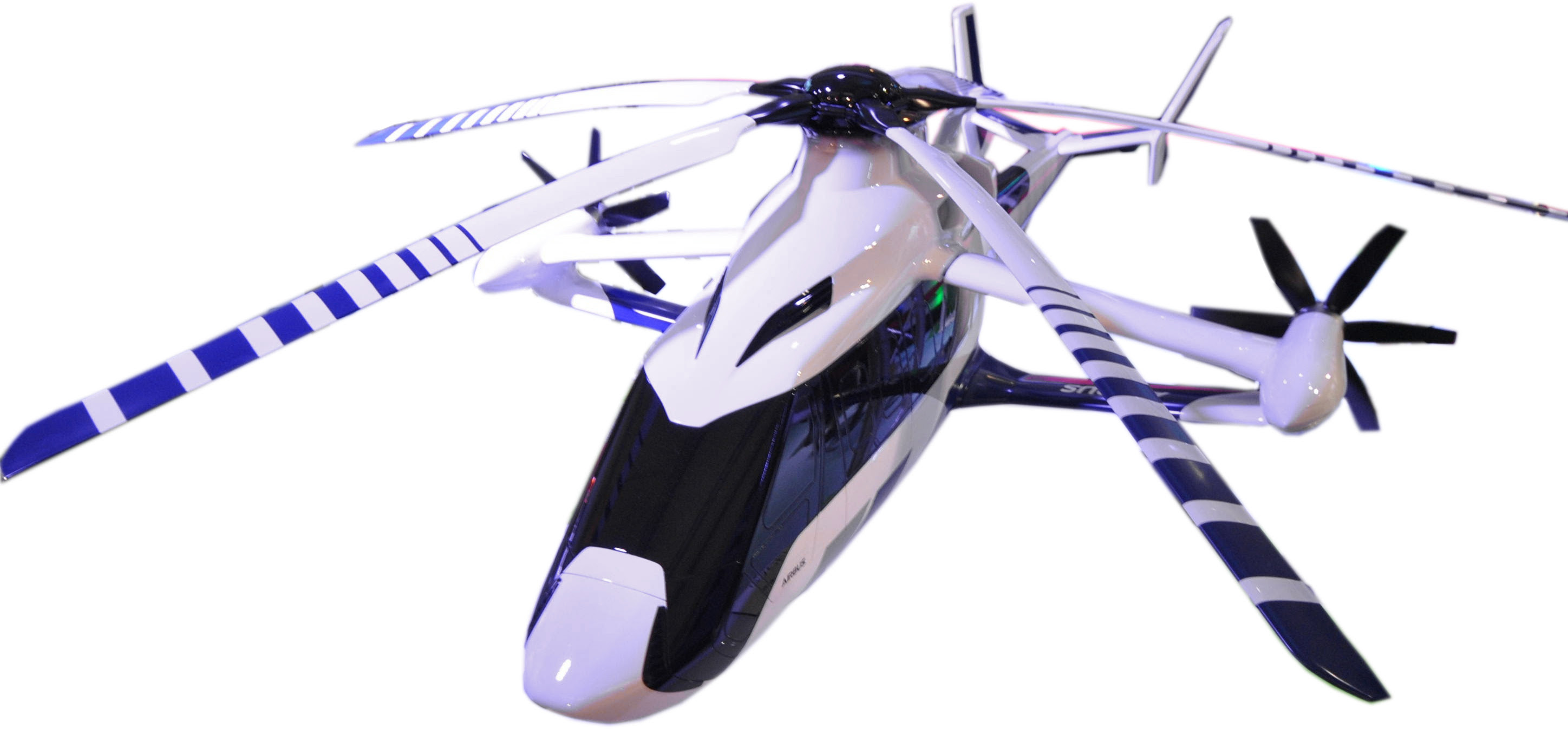
RACER model at Paris Air Show 2017

The Airbus RACER (Rapid And Cost-Effective Rotorcraft) is a development revealed at the June 2017 Paris air show, final assembly was planned to start in 2019 for a 2020 first flight. Cruising up to 400 km/h (216 kn), it aims for a 25% cost reduction per distance over a conventional helicopter.

== Specifications ==
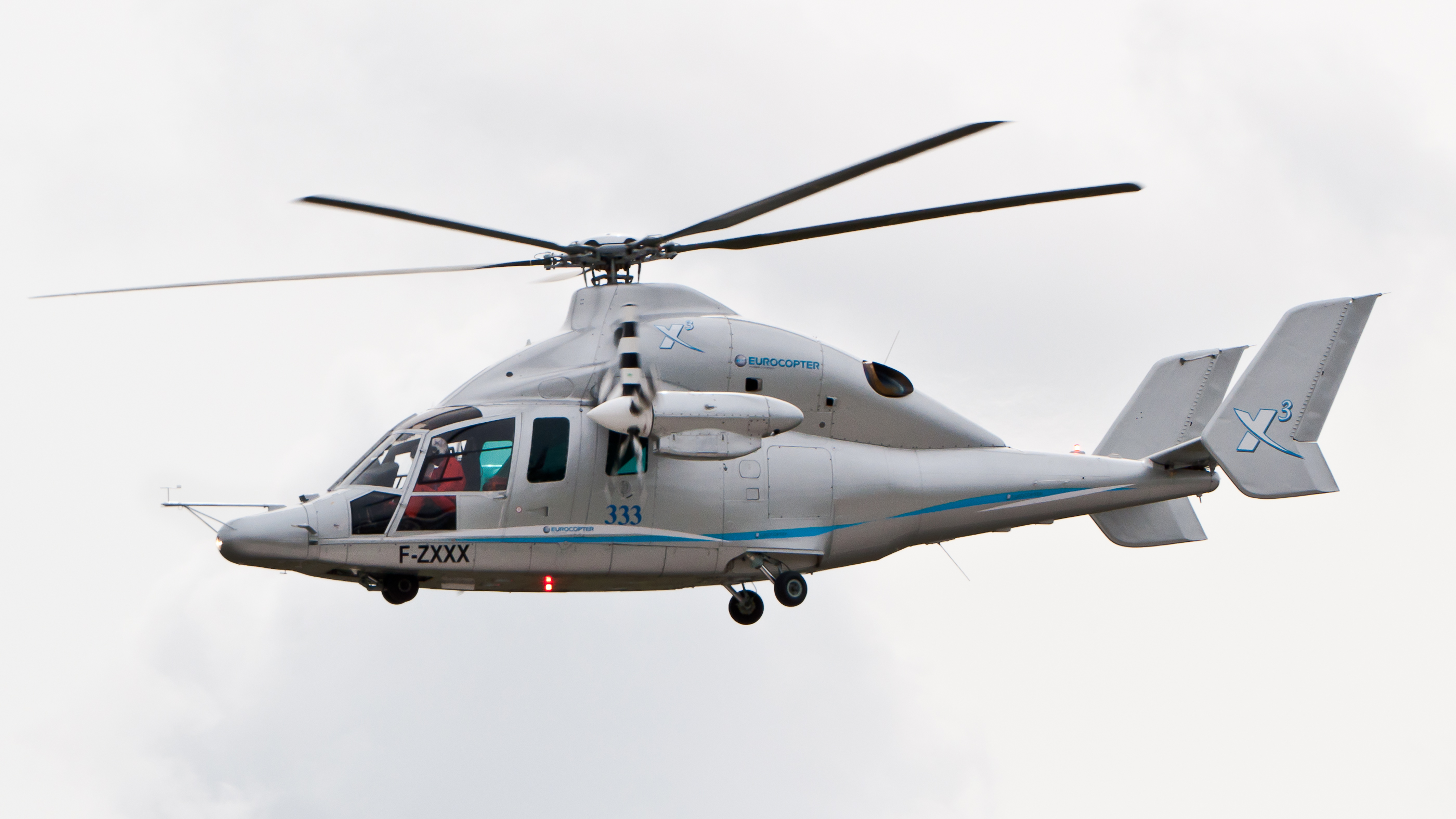
Eurocopter X³ at ILA Berlin Air Show 2012

Data from FlightGlobal

General characteristics

- Crew: 2
- Gross weight: 5,200 kg (11,464 lb)
- Powerplant: 2 × Rolls-Royce Turbomeca RTM322-01/9a turboshaft engines, 1,693 kW (2,270 hp) each
- Main rotor diameter: 12.6 m (41 ft 4 in)
- Main rotor area: 124.7 m^{2} (1,342 sq ft)
- Propellers: 5-bladed (two tractor propellers gear driven from main engines).
- Main rotor: five-bladed from the Eurocopter EC155

Performance

- Maximum speed: 472 km/h (293 mph, 255 kn) at roughly 10,000 ft (3,048 m)
- Cruise speed: 407 km/h (253 mph, 220 kn)
- Service ceiling: 3,810 m (12,500 ft)
- Rate of climb: 28 m/s (5,500 ft/min)
- Tip speed: 0.91 Mach
- Autorotation: 2,800 f.p.m

== See also ==
- Fairey Rotodyne

Related development

- Eurocopter AS365 Dauphin
- Eurocopter EC155

Aircraft of comparable role, configuration, and era

- Kamov Ka-92
- Mil Mi-X1
- Piasecki X-49

Related lists

- List of rotorcraft
