= Mil Mi-X1 =

Type of aircraft

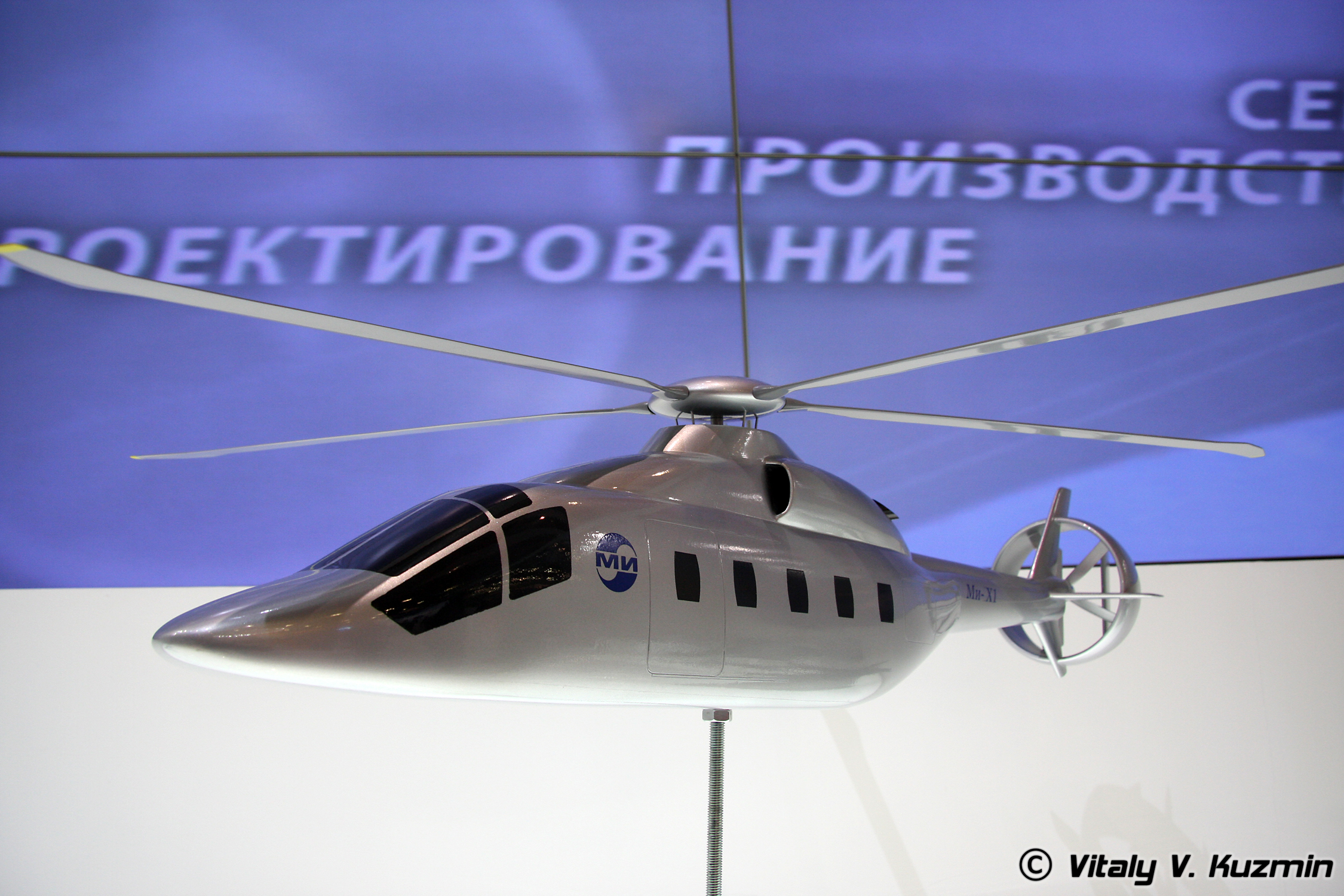

General information
- Type: High-speed transport helicopter
- National origin: Russia
- Manufacturer: Mil
- Status: Design study for competition

Mil Mi-X1 is a high-speed helicopter being proposed by Mil of Russia. The aircraft belongs to the same program as its competitor Kamov Ka-92 intended to create a new generation of middle-class helicopters cruising at about 500 km/h (312 mph). Its preliminary design and early specifications were unveiled at HeliRussia 2009 exhibition near Moscow. The design is competing for a US$1.3 billion project by the Russian government and Kamov is the other competitor.

== Design ==
The Mi-X1 is designed to have a take-off weight of just 10 tons, seat 25 passengers and fly to 1,500 km. It has one main rotor and a rear mount lift rotor. The helicopter's single main rotor means that in order to travel at high speeds it will have to overcome the retreating blade stall (RBS). This phenomenon occurs at airspeeds of some 300 km/h, and leads to vibrations that may ultimately destroy the rotor. Mil’s solution to fighting the onset of the RBS is to offload the rotor with the help of the proprietary Stall Local Elimination System (SLES). According to Mil Chief Designer Nikolay Pavlenko, the designers have already agreed to test SLES at Russia’s TsAGI Central Aerohydrodynamics Institute.

Earlier the manufacturer asserted that using SLES alone would give the Mi-X1 a speed of 450–500 km/h. According to the updated information made public at HeliRussia 2009, the helicopter will have a cruise speed of 475 km/h and a dash speed of 495 to 520 km/h. This will be possible through the use of a pusher propeller and a number of aerodynamic improvements, including a retractable landing gear and streamlined forward and rear fuselage sections.

The Mi-X1 may be powered by two uprated Klimov VK-2500 turboshafts or two future Klimov VK-3000 currently under development. Similar engines are installed on Mil Mi-28 and Kamov Ka-50 attack helicopters.

Development of the Mi-X1 and Ka-92 was switched from Ministry for Industry and Trade to Ministry of Defence in 2015 due to reduced government funding and high operating cost. A Russian Air Force general expects a prototype to fly in 2018, with production in 2022. Russia started a single seat "flying laboratory" based on the Mil Mi-24 in 2015, intended to go 400 kilometers per hour (248 miles per hour).

== See also ==
Aircraft of comparable role, configuration, and era

- Eurocopter X³
- Kamov Ka-92
- Piasecki X-49
- Sikorsky S-97

== Literature ==
- Russia & CIS Observer May 2009
