= Proprotor =

Type of airfoil

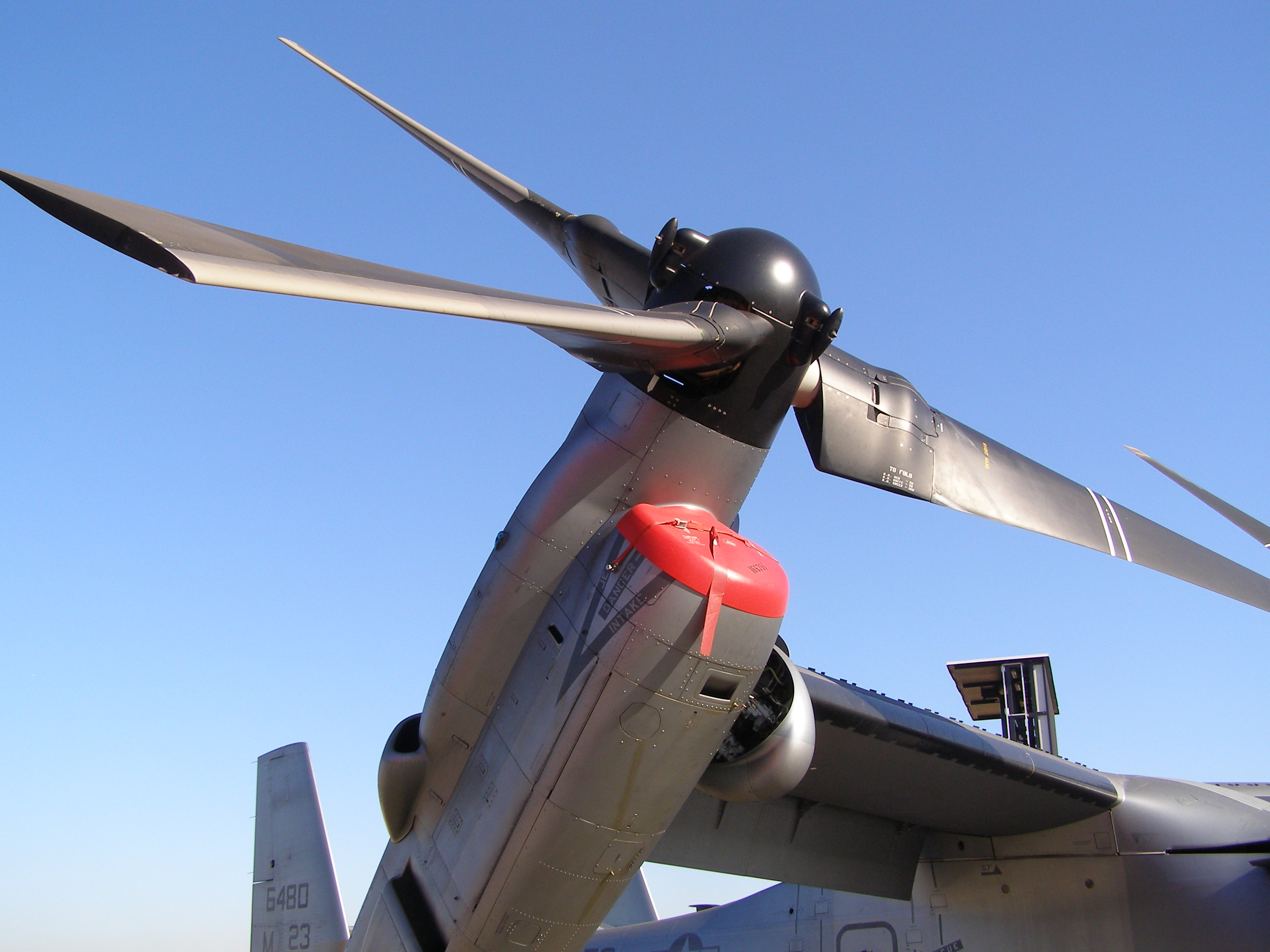
A closeup of one of the V-22 Osprey's dual proprotors.

A proprotor is a spinning airfoil that functions as both an airplane-style propeller and a helicopter-style rotor. Several proprotor-equipped convertiplanes, such as the Bell Boeing V-22 Osprey tiltrotor, are capable of switching back and forth between flying akin to both helicopters and fixed-wing aircraft. Accordingly this type of airfoil has been predominantly applied to vertical takeoff and landing (VTOL) aircraft.

The dual-role airfoil is accomplished by one of several design approaches:

- changing the angle of attack of the wing that the proprotor is attached to, from approximately zero degrees to around ninety degrees: a tiltwing aircraft,
- changing the angle of attack of only the rotor hub, and possibly the engine that drives it, as on a tiltrotor,
- changing the angle of attack of the entire aircraft, as on a tailsitter, which launches and lands on its tail.

== Application details ==
On several aerial vehicles such as the AgustaWestland AW609 and V-22 Osprey, a pair of three-bladed proprotors have been used. Both the proprotors and engines are mounted on load-bearing rotatable pylon at the wingtips, allowing the proprotors to be positioned at various angles. In the case of the AW609's, while flown in helicopter mode, the proprotors can be positioned between a 75- and 95-degree angle from the horizontal, with 87 degrees being the typical selection for hovering vertically; and in aeroplane mode, the proprotors are rotated forward and locked in position at a zero-degree angle, spinning at 84% RPM. STOL rolling-takeoff and landing capability is achieved by having the nacelles tilted forward up to 45°.

Typically, flight control software would perform much of the complex transition between the distinct helicopter and aeroplane modes; while automated systems are usually provided to inform crews on the optimal tilt angle and air speed to pursue. Furthermore, it is typical for flight controls, such as blade pitch, to both resemble and function akin to their counterparts on conventional rotorcraft, easing the transition of conventional helicopter pilots to such vehicles.

Proprotors can be designed to fold for storage purposes. However, in the case of the V-22, in order to facilitate proprotor folding, the proprotor's diameter had to be constrained to a diameter of 38-foot (11.6 m), five feet (1.5 m) less than optimal for vertical takeoff; this difference has been attributed for causing relatively high disk loading.

In a typical implementation, both proprotors must be rotating in order to maintain flight in helicopter mode. To guard against instances of single engine failure, on both the V-22 and AW609, both engines are connected by drive shafts to a common central gearbox so that one engine can power both proprotors if such a failure occurs. Despite this provision, the V-22 is generally not capable of hovering on a single engine. If a proprotor gearbox fails, that proprotor cannot be feathered, and both engines must be stopped prior to an emergency landing. The autorotation characteristics are poor partly due to the rotors' low inertia.

== Aircraft ==
- Bell XV-15 – American experimental tiltrotor aircraft
- Bell Boeing V-22 Osprey – Military transport tiltrotor
- Bell Eagle Eye – 1990s American tiltrotor UAV
- Bell V-280 Valor – American tiltrotor VTOL aircraft
- AgustaWestland AW609 – Twin-engine tiltrotor VTOL aircraft
- NASA Puffin – Single person aircraft
- Leonardo Next-Generation Civil Tiltrotor – Twin-engine tiltrotor aircraft demonstrator

	Aerostat	Aerodyne		
	Lift: Lighter than air gas	Lift: Fixed wing	Lift: Unpowered rotor	Lift: Powered rotor
Unpowered free flight	(Free) balloon	Glider	Helicopter, etc. in autorotation	(None – see note 2)
Tethered (static or towed)	Tethered balloon	Kite	Rotor kite	(None – see note 2)
Powered	Airship	Airplane, ornithopter, etc.	Autogyro	Gyrodyne, helicopter
