= Advisory Council for Aeronautics Research in Europe =

European advisory body

The Advisory Council for Aeronautics Research in Europe (ACARE) is a European advisory body that aims to improve the competitiveness and sustainability of the European Union in the field of aeronautics. It is a public-private partnership between the Directorate-General for Transport and Energy of the European Commission and industry leaders. ACARE was launched at the Paris Airshow in June 2001 and has about 40 members.

== Overview ==
In the year 2000 the Belgian European Commissioner for Research, Innovation and Science, Philippe Busquin, invited a number of aviation industry leaders to produce a strategy detailing how the European Commission could help Europe's aviation industry become more competitive. This ‘Group of Personalities’ published ‘’European Aeronautics: A Vision for 2020’’ in January 2001. The document recommended the creation of ACARE, which would define the content of a long-term strategy to create a coherent European aviation research network. This network would bring together industry leaders, government actors from the member states of the European Union, and the European Commission.

Following the publication of ACARE's ‘’Strategic Research Agenda’’, the Commission launched a number of aeronautical research bodies and initiatives as part of the 6th and 7th Framework Programmes for Research and Technological Development and the Horizon 2020 Research and Innovation Programme. Prominent examples of these include the Clean Sky Joint Undertaking, a public-private partnership coordinating and funding research projects that aim to mitigate the environmental impact of aviation by developing more fuel-efficient technologies, and the SESAR Joint Undertaking, which aims to improve the efficiency of the European air traffic management system.
