= Leonardo Next-Generation Civil Tiltrotor =

Twin-engine tiltrotor aircraft demonstrator

Next-Generation Civil Tiltrotor

General information
- Type: Tiltrotor demonstrator
- National origin: Italy
- Manufacturer: Leonardo S.p.A.
- Status: Under development

History
- First flight: 19 December 2025

The Leonardo Next-Generation Civil Tiltrotor (NextGenCTR or NGCTR) is a tiltrotor aircraft demonstrator designed and developed by the Italian aerospace company Leonardo S.p.A. Studies for a two times larger tiltrotor than the AgustaWestland AW609 started in 2000. Since 2014, its development is sponsored by the European Union's Clean Sky 2 program. By May 2021, major components were under production By 2023, the maiden flight had been pushed back to 2024, from a 2020 initial plan.

The 11 t (24,000 lb) MTOW, pressurised aircraft should seat 19 to 22 passengers, reach up to 330 kn (610 km/h) over a range of 500 nmi (930 km). Initial requirements targeted lower costs than conventional rotorcraft. The engines stay in a fixed position while the proprotors swivels independently, powered by a split gearbox.

== Development ==
During 1998, the European helicopter manufacturer AgustaWestland partnered with the American aerospace company Bell Helicopters to develop a production tiltrotor based on the earlier experimental Bell XV-15. The resulting AgustaWestland AW609 is the first civilian tiltrotor. In 2000, AgustaWestland began studies for the Next-Generation Civil Tiltrotor (NGCTR), twice the size of the AW609.

In August 2014, the European Union launched its CleanSky 2 research initiative, to award contracts advancing aerospace technology. AgustaWestland received $328 million through this programme towards the NGCTR, then in the detailed design study phase, while 60% of the funding was passed on to partners in the project, along with the Airbus RACER compound helicopter. By October 2014, the maiden flight was targeted for 2020. New prop-rotor designs, new wing geometries, optimized engine configurations, lean manufacturing, low carbon footprint and other applicable technologies were evaluated.

By 2017, the first flight had been pushed back to 2023. During September 2017, an Italian Aerospace Research Centre-led consortium was selected to design and produce the NGCTR's wing. In 2018, Leonardo defined the rotorcraft's structural requirements with a preliminary design review released on 26 November, before a critical design review in 2019, the prototype's wing assembly in 2020.

The preliminary design review started in December 2018 and was scheduled to be completed by the first quarter of 2019, while the critical design review was pushed back to 2020 and prototype construction was then planned between 2021 and 2022.

In early 2019, Leonardo selected the General Electric CT7 turboshaft to power the NGCTR demonstrator. The wing was tested in a windtunnel for a second phase in early 2021.

By May 2021, major components of the demonstrator were under production by Leonardo and its partners ahead of final assembly. Certification must comply with EASA CS-25 for large airplanes and CS-29 for large rotorcraft. By 2023, first flight was planned for 2024.

== Design ==
The preliminary design concept, aimed at the deepwater drilling energy market, was of a pressurized aircraft with an 11 t (24,000 lb) MTOW to seat 19 to 22 passengers, reach up to 330 kn (610 km/h) over a range of 500 nmi (930 km) and up to a ceiling of 25,000 ft (7,600 m). The initial requirements targeted direct operating costs that were 30% below those of conventional rotorcraft, while recurring costs were 50% below. The CleanSky 2 performance objectives for 2020, compared to contemporary aircraft from 2000, were a 17% drag reduction, a 7% to 20% noise reduction, and a 250 nmi (460 km) radius flown in 1 hour 45 minutes, hover included. By 2021, AgustaWestland intends to achieve comparable manufacturing and operating costs to those of conventional helicopters.

The wings will be made out of epoxy carbon fiber, their 12 m (39 ft) wingspan is broadly similar to that of the preceding AW609 tiltrotor, while the chord is roughly doubled to 1.9 m (6 ft 3 in). Each wing has two control surfaces: flaperons for lift and control, and another lowered during vertical take offs, to reduce the exposed wing area to the propeller flow. While compact, the wing's structure features a highly integrated wingbox of composite construction, permitting the large movable surfaces over half the wing chord. The NGCTR's proprotors and wingtips are movable while the engines are static, unlike earlier tiltrotors, for better aerodynamic efficiency. Power is delivered from the engines to the swiveling proprotor assemblies through a split gearbox. Each composite rotorblades include a heat-generating layer for ice protection.

== Specifications (NGCTR) ==
Data from Flightglobal

General characteristics

- Capacity: 18-25 passengers
- Powerplant: 2 × General Electric CT7 turboshaft engines, 1,490 kW (2,000 hp) each

== See also ==
- Airbus RACER

Related development

- AgustaWestland AW609

Related lists

- List of VTOL aircraft
