= Breakthrough Laminar Aircraft Demonstrator in Europe =

Airbus experimental aircraft design project

The Breakthrough Laminar Aircraft Demonstrator in Europe (BLADE) is an Airbus project within the European Clean Sky framework to flight-test experimental laminar-flow wing sections on an A340 from September 2017.

== Design ==
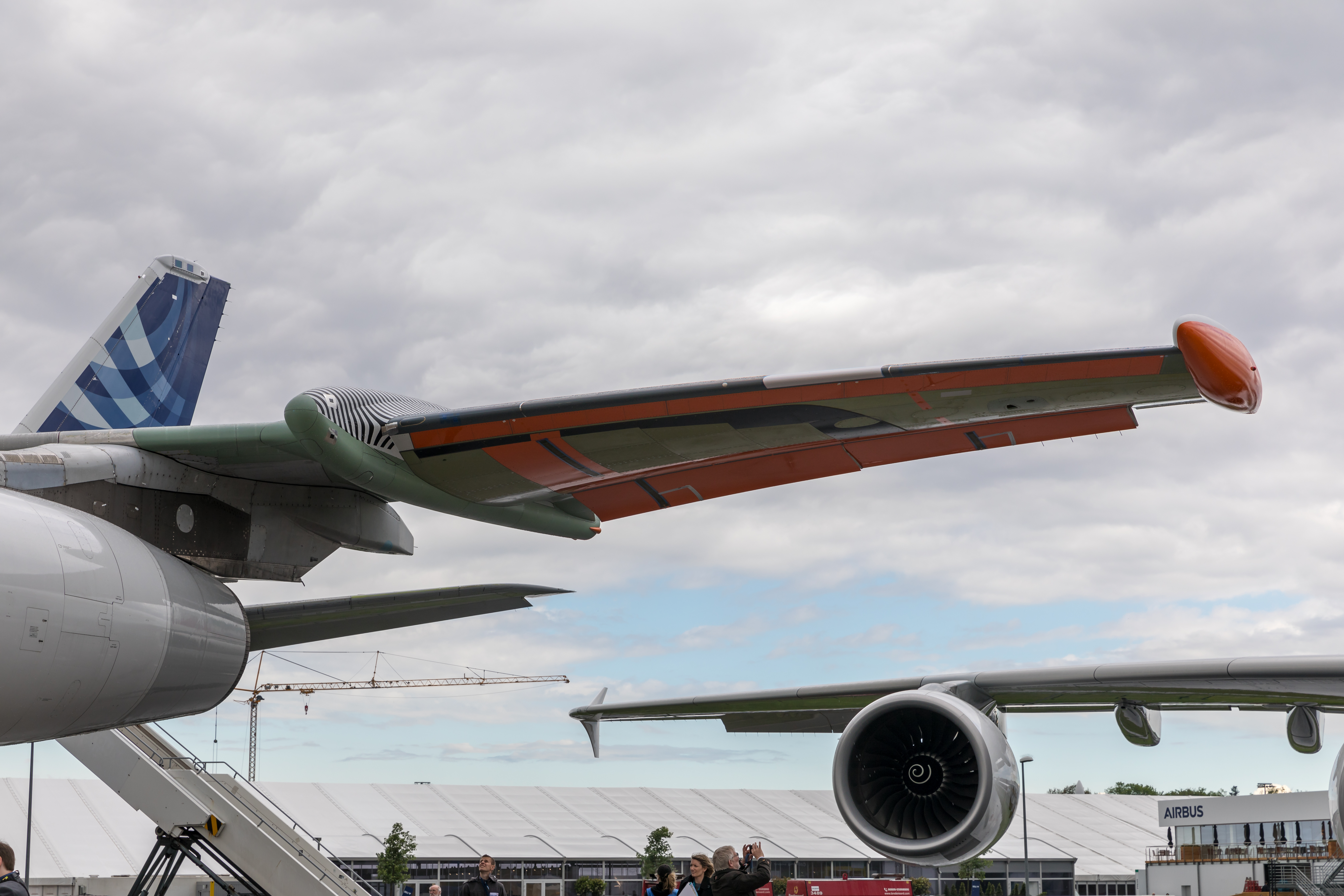
The left laminar flow wing section

Natural laminar flow is opposed to hybrid laminar flow artificially induced through hardware. It is difficult to industrialise a wing smooth enough to sustain the laminar flow in operation, due to having very tight design and manufacturing tolerances, leading-edge retractable slats, and fasteners, that is aerodynamically robust enough, and can withstand surface deformations and dirt, de-icing fluid, and rain-droplet contamination.

The 9-metre (30 ft) metallic outboard section with a carbon-fiber-reinforced plastic upper laminar-flow surface is isolated from the rest of the wing and has two ailerons on each side. Its wing sweep is around 20° for a Mach-0.75 cruise, instead of 30° for a Mach-0.82–0.84 cruise. Laminar flow is expected along 50% of chord length instead of just aft of the leading edge, halving the wing friction drag, reducing the overall aircraft drag by 8%, and saving up to 5% in fuel on a 1,500-kilometre (900 mi) sector.

== Development ==
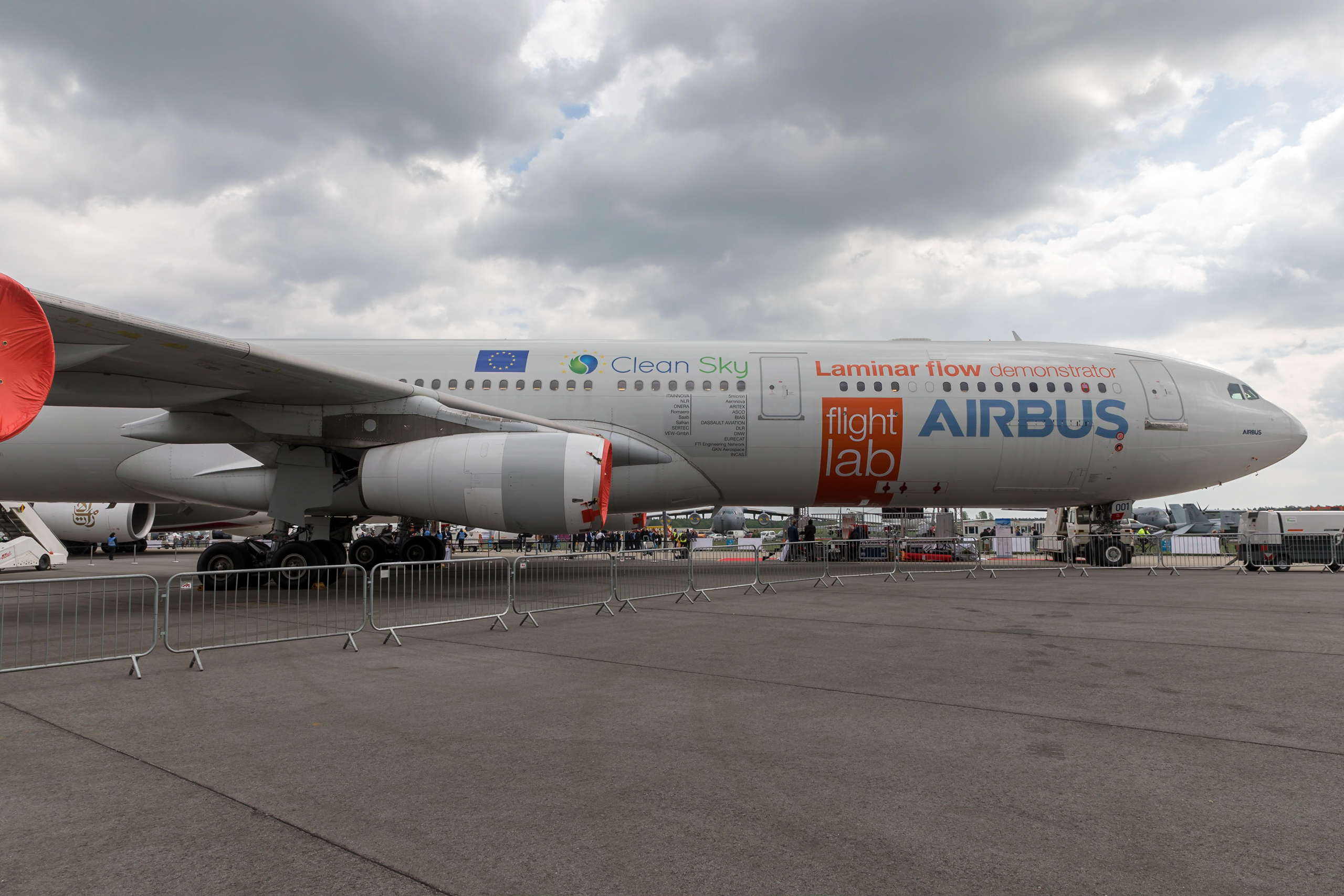
The A340 flight demonstrator

The demonstrator took off on 26 September, 2017.

In April 2018, after 66 flight hours, drag reduction is better than expected at 10%, and laminar flow is more stable than anticipated, including when the wing twists and flexes. Both wings with their carbon-fibre upper sustainably generate the desired effect, while the carbon-fibre left-wing leading edge and metallic right-wing leading edge have small differences in aerodynamic effects. The aerodynamic benefits could be sustained at Mach 0.78 up from Mach 0.75, and next-generation single-aisles could begin using it in the late 2020s.

Tests will continue until 2019 and will include wing contamination and a fixed Krüger flap.

Morphing flaps should be flight tested from May 2020.
