= Clean Aviation Joint Undertaking =

European aviation noise pollution initiative

- CAJU

Joint Undertaking overview
- Formed: 2008; 18 years ago
- Headquarters: Avenue de la Toison d’Or 56-60, 4th Floor 1060 Brussels Belgium; 50.835070°N 4.354600°E
- Motto: Innovation Takes Off
- Annual budget: €1.6bn (Clean Sky), €4bn (Clean Sky 2)
- Joint Undertaking executive: Axel Krein, Executive Director
- Key document: Council Regulation (EU) 558/2014
- Website: cleansky.eu

The Clean Aviation Joint Undertaking (CAJU), formerly known as Clean Sky Joint Undertaking, is a public-private partnership between the European Commission and the European aeronautics industry that coordinates and funds research activities to deliver significantly quieter and more environmentally friendly aircraft. The CAJU manages the Clean Sky Programme (CS), the Clean Sky 2 Programme (CS2), and now as Clean Aviation Joint Undertaking (CAJU), making it Europe's foremost aeronautical research body.

== Clean Sky ==
=== Overview ===
Aeronautics is noted for its capacity to innovate and to change the lives of millions of people. Also, for the complexity of its hardware and systems, which means the research and development cycles in the industry (the time it takes for an idea to get from the drawing board to the market) are very long, typically between 20 and 30 years. The risk associated with the large-scale investment required to drive technological progress is very high. In parallel, the environmental impact of the industry currently accounts for 3% of global man-made carbon emissions and is set to increase substantially in the years to come, as modern societies demand better connection among people, countries and regions. By coordinating the research activities of the industry, the CSJU develops new technologies that would otherwise be beyond the manageable risk of the private sector: it provides the necessary funding to develop and introduce innovations within timeframes that would otherwise be unachievable.

As such, the CSJU is intended to be the body that will be the main contributor in realising the Advisory Council for Aeronautics Research in Europe (ACARE) 2020 environmental goals for the industry. These goals are:

- A 50% reduction in carbon dioxide (CO_{2}) emissions.
- An 80% reduction in mono-nitrogen oxides (NO_{x}) emissions.
- A noise reduction for flying aircraft of 50%.
- Mitigate the environmental impact of the lifecycle of aircraft and related products. (1)

=== Organization ===
The CSJU Governing Board, made up of representatives from the industry and the commission, identifies strategic areas where research and innovation are essential. ‘Calls for Proposals' are then launched depending on the evolving needs of the industry. Small or medium-sized enterprises (SMEs), industrial leaders, universities, and professional research organisations respond to the calls with detailed plans for research activities and an outline of the funding that they will require to develop their new technologies. To guarantee an efficient allocation of resources, the applications are evaluated by a panel of independent external experts who advise the CSJU on the proposals with the best potential. The winning proposals then receive funding and other support from the CSJU. The initial Clean Sky Programme, which runs from 2008 to 2016, has a budget of €1.6 billion. Half of this was provided by the European Commission's Framework Package 7 Research and Innovation Programme and the other half was provided by financial and in-kind contributions from the industry leaders.

=== Research areas in Clean Sky ===
The strategic areas where research and innovation are essential are called Integrated Technology Demonstrators (ITDs). There are six of them, each one co-led by two industry leaders that are committed for the full duration of the programme:

==== Green Regional Aircraft ====
Green Regional Aircraft (GRA): Co-led by Airbus and Alenia. This ITD focuses on small, low-weight aircraft.

==== Smart Fixed Wing Aircraft ====
Smart Fixed Wing Aircraft (SFWA): Co-led by Airbus and SAAB. This ITD focuses on wing technologies and configurations covering large aircraft and business jets.

==== Green Rotorcraft ====
Green Rotorcraft (GRC): Co-led by AgustaWestland and Airbus Helicopters. This ITD focuses on innovative rotor blades, integration of diesel engine technology and advanced electrical systems for elimination of noxious hydraulic fluids.

==== Sustainable and Green Engines ====
Sustainable and Green Engines (SAGE): Co-led by Rolls-Royce and Safran. This ITD focuses on novel configurations such as open rotors and intercoolers.

==== Systems for Green Operations ====
Systems for Green Operations (SGO): Co-led by Liebherr and Thales. This ITD focuses on electrical aircraft equipment, system architectures, thermal management and capabilities for greener trajectories.

==== Eco-Design ====
Eco-Design (ED): Co-led by Dassault Aviation and Fraunhofer Gesellschaft. This ITD focuses on mitigating the environmental impact of the design, production, withdrawal, and recycling of aircraft by optimising material and energy use.

Complementing the six ITDs is the Technology Evaluator (TE). Once the new technologies have been developed and integrated into a test model or aircraft, the TE assesses the environmental improvements by carrying out demonstration activities and test flights and comparing the results with aircraft that have not been equipped with the new technologies. The difference in fuel saved, noise emitted etc. is the extent of the success of the technology.

=== Achievements ===
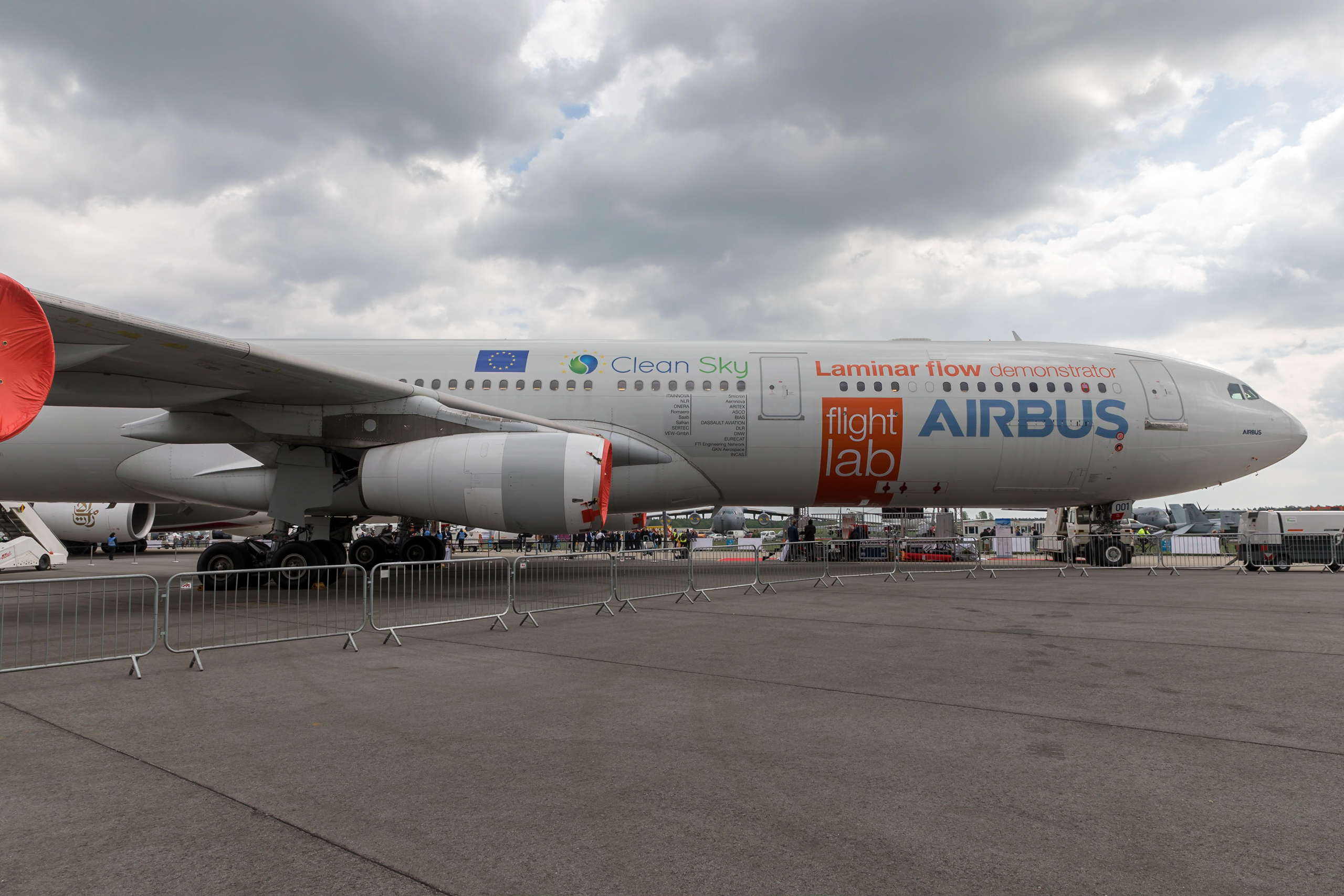
The A340 BLADE demonstrator

An Open Rotor demonstration led by Safran was launched in 2008 within the program with 65 million euros funding over eight years : a demonstrator was assembled in 2015, and ground tested in May 2017 on its open-air test rig in Istres, aiming to reduce fuel consumption and associated CO_{2} emissions by 30% compared with current CFM56 turbofans.

The Breakthrough Laminar Aircraft Demonstrator in Europe (BLADE) is an Airbus project within the framework to flight-test experimental laminar-flow wing sections on an A340 from September 2017.

Other examples of hardware that have been developed with the support of Clean Sky include:

- Open Rotor Blade: Blade intended for engines powering the single-aisle jets that will enter service in 2025–2030.
- Droop nose demonstrator: This demonstrator is the 1.1 leading edge of a regional A/C for enhanced high-lift performances. The droop nose demonstrator is thought as a technology platform enabling full morphing capabilities, embedded CNT (Carbon nanotube) based ice-protection system, OF (Optical fibres) for strain measurement, temperature sensors, SMA (Shape-memory alloy) based internal patch actuators, SJ (Synthetic jets) for active flow control.
- High Compression Engine Model: A new technology to provide a sustainable alternative to the classic turbine engine, reducing both fuel consumption and emissions.
- Smart flap composite load introduction rib: Full scale composite load introduction rib of a smart flap for DAV business jet application developed with resin transfer moulding manufacturing technology. This load introduction rib, involving the main structural parts of a flap, demonstrates the potential of low-cost, low-weight, low-complexity composite flaps.
- HEMAS actuator: Fault tolerant Electromechanical Main Rotor Actuator including a safety clutch. The HEMAS System is enabling hydraulic-free, more electric helicopter architectures.
- Fuel Injector: An early fuel injector from the Rolls-Royce technology for the Clean Sky SAGE 6 lean burn programme.
- H1 Part 6: titanium fan wheel: New generation of lightweight environmentally friendly fan wheel of an air cooling unit manufactured by additive manufacturing SLM technology which provide an alternative route to conventional methodologies (bar machining).
- Morphing flap two-bay prototype: Smart structure enabling the camber-morphing of a wing flap segment.
- PRIMARY In-flight Icing detection system: Safely detects the presence of atmospheric conditions that might be conducive to ice build-up on the aerodynamic surfaces of an aircraft.
- Electronic Power Module: A modular smart power converter with flexible power management for electric aircraft.
- Solid State Power Controller enhanced with high-frequency voltage chopping capability for Electrical Energy Management strategy implementation: The overall generator weight can be reduced by up to 10% due to the removal of the 5-minute capacity overload.
- GKN Scoop Intake with integrated electro-thermal ice protection and acoustic attenuation: ECS air intake with integrated electro-thermal ice protection and acoustic attenuation technology. Tested in GKN Icing Wind Tunnel in 2011.
- Annulus Filler: The composite Annulus Filler is located between the fan blades and it directs the airstream to ensure optimal fan blade efficiency.
- Green PU Seating cushion (Head Rest): Head rest of a three part seating cushion system. 22 weight% bio based flexible polyurethane foam without a flame retardant.
- Seamless Morphing Leading Edge Demonstrator: Design of an actuation system that could deform a morphing leading edge seamlessly.
- Nacelle Composite Component made with a liquid resin infusion process and cured on a heating tool: Nacelle composite part made of epoxy resin and carbon fibre by using liquid resin infusion on a heating tool.

== Clean Sky 2 ==
Following the success of the initial Clean Sky Programme, its successor, Clean Sky 2, was launched in 2014(2) as part of the commission's Horizon 2020 Research and Innovation Programme. Clean Sky 2 aims to be the main contributor to the commission's Flightpath 2050 goals set by ACARE, which are more ambitious than those of the initial Clean Sky Programme.

These goals are:

- A 75% reduction in carbon dioxide (CO_{2}) emissions.
- A 90% reduction in mono-nitrogen oxides (NO_{x}).
- A noise reduction of flying aircraft of 65%.
- Mitigate the environmental impact of the lifecycle of aircraft and related products by designing and manufacturing aircraft to be recyclable.(3)

Clean Sky 2 will also contribute to maintaining global leadership in European aeronautics. As such, Clean Sky 2 will require a larger membership, a bigger budget, and research activity in a wider range of areas.

=== Research areas in Clean Sky 2 ===
- Three Innovative Aircraft Demonstrator Platforms (IADPs), for Large Passenger Aircraft, Regional Aircraft and Fast Rotorcraft, developing and testing flying demonstrators at the full aircraft/vehicle level;
- Three Integrated Technology Demonstrators (ITDs), looking at airframe, engines and systems, using demonstrators at major integrated system level;
- Two Transverse Activities (Small Air Transport, Eco-Design), integrating the knowledge of different ITDs and IADPs for specific applications and enabling synergies to be exploited between different platforms through shared projects and results;
- The Technology Evaluator (TE), monitoring and assessing the environmental and societal impact of the technologies developed in the IADPs and ITDs.

=== Activities (incomplete list) ===
==== Ice protection ====
Within the programme, a passive ice protection system will be tested on an engine inlet and nacelle mockup in an icing wind tunnel at de:Rail Tec Arsenal in Austria by early 2020, using capillary forces generated by vaporisation in a metallic porous "wick" in an evaporator to provide heat transfer with no moving parts to a condenser, like in space applications, reducing weight and energy requirements.

==== High-speed rotorcraft ====
Within Clean Sky 2, the EU funds two high-speed rotorcraft: the Airbus RACER compound helicopter and the Leonardo Next-Generation Civil Tiltrotor (NGCTR).

==== Hybrid-electric ====
In 2016, French ONERA, German DLR and Dutch TU Delft/NLR were contracted to evaluate 35 radical configurations to replace conventional airliner designs from 2035, meeting Airbus A320 requirements: 150 passengers, a Mach 0.78 cruise and 1,200 nmi (2,200 km) of range. TU Delft and NLR presented their distributed hybrid-electric propulsion (DHEP) study Under Novair project at the January 2019 AIAA SciTech conference, having selected three more likely configurations:

- HS1, a parallel hybrid boosted turbofan for takeoff and climb;
- HS2, a serial hybrid concept with distributed propellers along the wing leading edge powered by turbogenerators;
- HS3, a serial hybrid with turbo generators powering distributed ducted fans over the wing flaps and the tail replaced by two ducted props.

Assuming 500 Wh/kg battery packs, achievable but beyond automotive or industrial applications, propulsion mass skyrocketed to 600% for HS2 and 730% for HS3, driving all the other masses and ending up consuming 34% more energy for HS3 and 51% for HS2, while HS1 showed a 10% better energy consumption.

==== Scaled Flight Demonstrator ====
In 2022, the Scaled Flight Demonstrator, a model of an Airbus A320 at 1/8.5 scale built as part of the Clean Sky 2 research program flew a test campaign. It can be used for both wind tunnel and flight tests, and aims to validate the use of scale models to reduce the gap between numerical simulations and full-scale flight tests.

== Clean Sky 3 / Clean Aviation ==
To cut 80% of air transport's CO_{2} emissions by 2050, Clean Sky 3 would need reverse planning: due to the life expectancy of aircraft, required technologies would have to enter service in 2030-35 and should be demonstrated in 2025–27. The 2021-27 EU budget should be voted on by the end of 2019 and detailed allocation in 2020, with the Horizon Europe research and innovation program maybe including Clean Sky 3 starting on January 1, 2021, at best.

On 23 March 2022, Clean Aviation, the successor to the Clean Sky 1 and 2 programmes, opened its first call for proposals with €735 million of funding over 36 months for hydrogen aircraft, hybrid electric aircraft, short- and medium-range aircraft, “transversal” technologies, and co-ordination and support. Hydrogen research gets €182 million, including €115 million for direct combustion with a 5,000shp (3,670 kW) turboprop and a 20,000 lb-thrust (89 kN) turbofan, €50 million for fuel cells, €10 million for storage, and €7 million for “near-term disruptive technologies”. Submissions are open until 23 June, with results announced in September and grants awarded in December. The second-phase will launch in 2025 to reach €1.7 billion of total funding, towards a 2035 service entry for the technologies developed. UK companies could be eligible if the country is associated to the Horizon Europe programme.
