= Kamov Ka-90 =

Projected high-speed helicopter built by Kamov

Ka-90
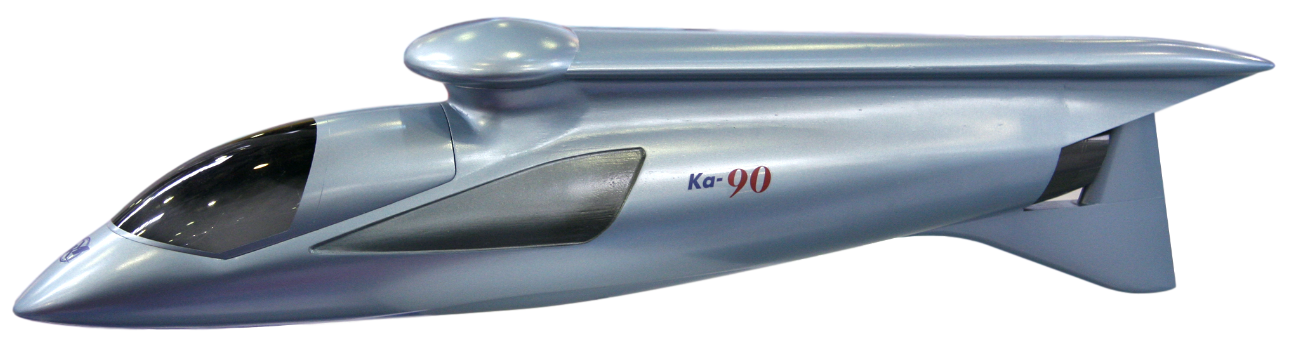
- A model of Kamov Ka-90 helicopter at the HeliRussia 2008 exhibition

General information
- Type: High-speed plane-helicopter hybrid
- National origin: Russia
- Manufacturer: Kamov
- Status: Design study for competition

The Kamov Ka-90 is a projected high-speed helicopter built by Kamov, a model of which was displayed at the HeliRussia 2008 trade show in April 2008. The concept is a hybrid design, flying like a helicopter for takeoff and landing and an aeroplane in cruise flight. The company's general designer Sergei Mikheyev said that the project was started in 1985. Although not developed at that time, it was under consideration in 2008.

In December 2017, Oleg Zheltov, the head of the Kamov Design Bureau confirmed that the work on the Ka-90 is underway and that the current stage of development includes research on design models and in wind tunnels.
