= Retreating blade stall =

Flight condition in helicopters

Retreating blade stall is a hazardous flight condition in helicopters and other rotary wing aircraft, where the retreating rotor blade has a lower relative blade speed, combined with an increased angle of attack, causing a stall and loss of lift. Retreating blade stall is the primary limiting factor of a helicopter's never exceed speed, V_{NE}.

Retreating blade stall occurs at high forward speeds, and should not be confused with rotor stall, which is caused by low rotor RPM and can occur at any forward speed.

== Advancing vs. retreating blades ==
| retreating blade side | advancing blade side |

A rotor blade that is moving in the same direction as the aircraft is called the advancing blade and the blade moving in the opposite direction is called the retreating blade.

Balancing lift across the rotor disc is important to a helicopter's stability. The amount of lift generated by an airfoil is proportional to the square of its airspeed (velocity). In a zero airspeed hover the rotor blades, regardless of their position in rotation, have equal airspeeds and therefore equal lift. In forward flight the advancing blade has a higher airspeed than the retreating blade, creating unequal lift across the rotor disc.

A fuller treatment is provided in dissymmetry of lift.

== Compensation ==
Most helicopter designs compensate for this by incorporating a certain degree of vertical "flap" movement of the rotor blades. When flapping, a rotor blade will travel upward during its advance, creating a lesser angle of attack (AOA) and therefore lesser lift. When the blade retreats, the blade falls downward again, increasing the AOA and therefore generating greater lift.

There are three general designs. The earliest, and by far least common design today, is the fully rigid rotor system; the blades are rigidly fixed to the rotor hub but made of a flexible material that allows some degree of flap.

Semi-rigid rotor systems have a horizontal hinge at the base of the blades that allow flap as they rotate. By necessity they always have an even number of blades, as each opposing pair is mechanically connected to prevent vibration.

Fully articulated rotor systems use a combination of flapping and a horizontal motion that moves the retreating blades forward slightly and moves them back again on the advancing side, thus creating more relative airflow and lift on the retreating side at the expense of the advancing side.

In all cases, the pilot may compensate the induced roll with left or right cyclic control input (as determined by the rotation of the rotor) up to a degree. However, the rapid rate of change of blade flex and angle of attack causes uncontrolled longitudinal twist and severe vibration in later stages, resulting in total loss of cyclic control if left unchecked. Assuming no rotor damage, recovery from this condition is possible and described below.

== Failure ==
These compensations can only do so much. Increasing angle of attack to compensate for reduced blade airspeed has the effect of maintaining lift only until the point where critical angle of attack is reached, beyond which lift sharply decreases.

All airfoils have a critical angle of attack (also called a stall angle of attack) which is the angle of attack that produces most lift. Above this angle flow over the airfoil becomes detached and lift decreases, a condition commonly called a stall.

When a fixed-wing aircraft exceeds its critical angle of attack the entire aircraft loses lift and enters a condition called a stall. The usual consequences of a fixed-wing stall are a sharp drop in aircraft altitude and a dive. Stalls in fixed-wing aircraft are virtually always recoverable events (given sufficient altitude).

In a retreating-blade stall, however, only the retreating half of the helicopter's rotor disc experiences a stall. The advancing blade continues to generate lift, but the retreating blade enters a stall condition, usually resulting in an uncommanded increase in pitch of the nose and a roll in the direction of the retreating side of the rotor disc. In counter-clockwise rotating rotor systems (as in most American-made types) this is the left side; in clockwise rotating systems (such as in most French and Russian models) it is a roll to the right.

== Flight performance during a retreating blade stall ==
As the aircraft approaches retreating blade stall conditions, it will shudder and the nose will begin to pitch up. The resultant upward pitching of the nose will naturally begin to correct the situation as it results in slowing the aircraft. If forced to continue the acceleration via flight controls (forward cyclic + raising collective), it may roll to the side of the retreating blade.

== Recovery ==
Recovery includes lowering the collective to reduce the blade angle of attack, followed by application of aft cyclic to reduce airspeed.

== Causes of retreating blade stall ==
Retreating blade stall is more likely to occur in a helicopter when the following conditions exist either alone or in combination:

- High gross weight
- High airspeed
- Low rotor RPM
- High density altitude
- Steep or abrupt turns
- Turbulent ambient air
