= Future Attack Reconnaissance Aircraft =

US Army helicopter program

Future Attack Reconnaissance Aircraft (FARA)

General information
- Project for: Utility and Scout/Attack Helicopter
- Issued by: United States Army
- Proposals: AVX/L3, Bell, Boeing, Karem, and Sikorsky
- Prototypes: Bell 360 Invictus; Sikorsky Raider X

History
- Outcome: Canceled
- Related: Future Vertical Lift (FVL); Future Long-Range Assault Aircraft (FLRAA)
- Predecessors: Light Helicopter Experimental; Armed Reconnaissance Helicopter; Armed Aerial Scout

The Future Attack Reconnaissance Aircraft (FARA) program was initiated by the United States Army in 2018 to develop a successor to the Bell OH-58 Kiowa scout helicopter as part of the Future Vertical Lift program. The OH-58 was retired in 2017; three prior programs for a successor were cancelled prior to reaching production: Light Helicopter Experimental (1982–2004, resulting in the Boeing–Sikorsky RAH-66 Comanche), Armed Reconnaissance Helicopter (2004–06, resulting in the Bell ARH-70 Arapaho), and Armed Aerial Scout (2012–13, evaluating commercial off-the-shelf designs). Several billions of dollars were spent without delivering any new helicopters to service, due to this cycle of development and cancellation. During this time the armed scout role was filled primarily by the Vietnam-era OH-58, which was finally retired in the late 2010s, leaving the Army to use attack helicopters to fill in this role.

Design contracts for FARA candidates were awarded in April 2019 to five manufacturers: AVX Aircraft (in partnership with L3Harris Technologies), Bell Helicopter, Boeing, Karem Aircraft, and Sikorsky Aircraft (part of Lockheed Martin now). In March 2020, the designs from Bell and Sikorsky were selected to proceed to Phase 2 of the competition, expected to end with a government flight test evaluation in fall 2023, followed by the selection of a successor by 2028. However, on 8 February 2024, the U.S. Army announced that the FARA program would be terminated due to developments in modern warfare rendering it unnecessary.

== Design goals ==
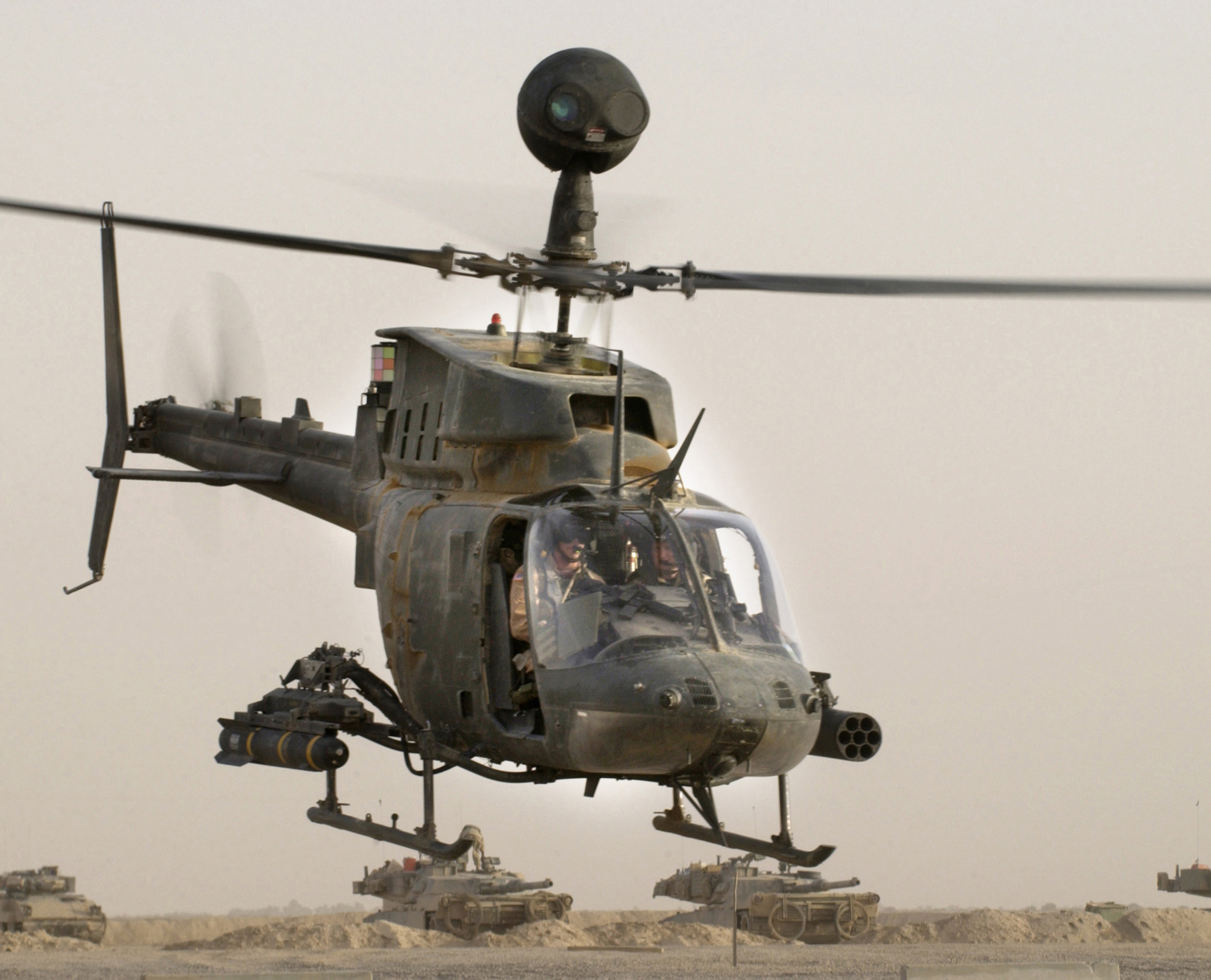
FARA was intended to develop a successor to the OH-58 in the armed reconnaissance role (pictured)

U.S. Army officials described FARA as the "knife-fighter" of future Army aviation capabilities, intended to deliver high performance in a compact aircraft. Under the initial request for proposals, FARA candidates were to use the engine selected through the Improved Turbine Engine Program (ITEP). Performance goals imposed relatively few constraints beyond overall dimensions, with maximum rotor diameter and fuselage width each not to exceed 40 feet (12 m). The proposed aircraft was expected to integrate government-furnished equipment (including weapons and the engine), align with affordability objectives, and meet desired range, endurance, and payload targets.

== Competition history ==
The OH-58 was retired without a clear successor in 2014; three successive programs were cancelled without reaching production; although the Army intended to perform a service life extension program for the OH-58 fleet in 2013, cuts to the defense budget forced its retirement. In lieu of the OH-58, the Army has used Boeing AH-64 Apache attack helicopters paired with AAI RQ-7 Shadow drones in the armed reconnaissance role.

FARA is part of the Future Vertical Lift program and its procurement is largely modeled on the Joint Multi-Role technology demonstration program. The US Army released a draft solicitation on June 22, 2018 for reconnaissance helicopter proposals, with the intent to have two flying prototype designs by 2023, which would compete for the final award. On October 3, 2018, the Army released its formal request for proposal and outlined its proposed schedule:

- Jun 2019: Award four to six initial candidate design contracts
- Mar 2020: Choose two of the initial candidate designs to be developed into flying prototypes
- Nov 2022: Fly-off competition to be held between the two prototype designs
- Future: Award contract based on results from fly-off competition

The FARA procurement, headed by Brigadier General Wally Rugen, would disburse $15 million per candidate selected in the first development phase. The two prototype candidates would each receive $735 million to build flying aircraft for the competition. In April 2019, the Army awarded candidate design contracts to five manufacturers: AVX/L3, Bell, Boeing, Karem, and Sikorsky. MD Helicopters, which was developing a variant of its MD902 Explorer with a wing to meet the Army's requirements, was not selected for the candidate design phase.

== Initial candidate designs ==
=== AVX/L3 ===
The AVX/L3 candidate design was unveiled at the summit of the Army Aviation Association of America in April 2019. The design, which AVX/L3 call the Compound Coaxial Helicopter (CCH), uses a side-by-side cockpit with main compound coaxial rotors; ducted fans at the tail provide both forward and reverse thrust.

=== Bell ===
The CEO of Textron, Bell's parent company, stated that its FARA candidate design would be based on technology developed for the 525, rather than a further development of the V-280 tiltrotor. In October 2019, Bell announced the 360 Invictus as its FARA candidate design, a winged helicopter with a single rotor and ducted tail rotor.

=== Boeing ===
As of October 2019, Boeing had not released details on its FARA candidate aircraft to the public. A Boeing executive declined to state if the recently unveiled Compound Apache would form the basis for the company's FARA candidate design. On February 13, 2020, Boeing released a teaser video and images of its FARA design. It offers stealth features. More details of the Boeing FARA design were revealed on March 3, 2020; it is a three-rotor compound helicopter with tandem seating.

=== Karem ===
Karem Aircraft announced in July 2019 it had partnered with Northrop Grumman and Raytheon to design its FARA candidate aircraft. On October 16, 2019, Karem unveiled its AR40 design, a compound helicopter with a rigid main rotor, a swiveling tail rotor/pusher propeller, and a pivoting wing.

=== Sikorsky ===
Sikorsky stated that its FARA candidate design would incorporate the compound coaxial rotors and pusher propeller design used on its Sikorsky X2 and S-97 Raider; the S-97 had initially been developed for the Armed Aerial Scout program. In October 2019, Sikorsky unveiled the Sikorsky Raider X, a scaled-up version of the S-97 Raider designed to accommodate the General Electric T901-900 turboshaft engine, which won the ITEP competition in February 2019.

== Finalists ==
On March 25, 2020, the US Army selected Bell and Sikorsky to move forward to develop flying prototypes. In May 2022, budget documents showed that flight testing would be delayed to Fiscal Year 2024, which starts in October 2023. Deliveries of the GE T901, developed under ITEP and installed in the FARA prototypes, were delayed until November 2022.

=== Cancellation ===
On 8 February 2024, the U.S. Army ended development on the FARA program. According to an Army press release, the decision was made after a "sober assessment of the modern battlefield". Army Chief of Staff Randy George stated it was influenced by the use of inexpensive unmanned aerial vehicle systems in the Russo-Ukrainian War. Production of the GE T901 engine would also be delayed pending compatibility with the Boeing AH-64 Apache and Sikorsky UH-60 Black Hawk. Development on the Future Long-Range Assault Aircraft (FLRAA) program and its winner, the Bell V-280 Valor, is continuing.

Reactions to the cancellation were mixed, noting that $9 billion had been spent over two decades on multiple cancelled programs, resulting in no replacement, and leaving the Army to rely on existing types to fill the role.
