= Sikorsky Raider X =

American high-speed scout and attack compound helicopter

S-97 Raider
- The Raider X is based on the S-97 Raider, seen here in flight

General information
- Type: Reconnaissance and attack compound helicopter
- National origin: United States
- Manufacturer: Sikorsky Aircraft
- Status: Canceled

History
- Developed from: Sikorsky S-97 Raider

The Sikorsky Raider X (stylized in all-caps as RAIDER X) (Sikorsky S-102) is a compound helicopter concept with two coaxial rotors and a single pusher propeller, designed by the Sikorsky Aircraft division of Lockheed Martin for the United States Army Future Attack Reconnaissance Aircraft (FARA) program. The Raider X concept was announced in October 2019. In March 2020, the Army selected the Raider X and the Bell 360 Invictus from a field of five design concept candidates. The Raider X and 360 Invictus concepts were to be built as flying prototypes for a competition scheduled for 2023. The FARA program was canceled in 2024.

== Development ==
Contracts were awarded in April 2019 to develop concept design candidates for FARA; five different teams were selected, including Sikorsky.

Sikorsky presented the Raider X concept candidate at the annual meeting of the Association of the United States Army on October 14, 2019. The Raider X concept was derived from the earlier Sikorsky S-97 Raider, which had been developed for the Army's Armed Aerial Scout program; the S-97 was in turn developed from the Sikorsky X2 prototype compound coaxial helicopter. A larger Sikorsky–Boeing SB-1 Defiant was also developed from the X2 under the Army's Future Vertical Lift program to create a joint multi-role rotorcraft; the SB-1 was a candidate for the Future Long Range Assault Aircraft program. The Sikorsky compound helicopter designs all use coaxial rigid rotors and a pusher propeller, which Sikorsky has collectively named "X2 Technology".

On March 25, 2020, the Army selected the Raider X and Bell 360 Invictus concept design candidates to proceed to an eventual flight competition; flying prototypes of each candidate design will be constructed, followed by test flights in 2022 leading up to a competitive flying demonstration no later than fall 2023. Sikorsky had already begun construction of its Raider X prototype by February 2020.

The US Army canceled its next generation Future Attack Reconnaissance Aircraft (FARA) program, service officials announced on 8 February 2024, taking a potential multi-billion-dollar contract off the table and throwing the service’s long-term aviation plans into doubt.

Raider X was powered up in April 2024, but Sikorsky has no plans for flights.

== Design ==
The Raider X, as required by FARA program specifications, is designed to use a single General Electric T901 engine. The GE T901 was developed under the Army's Improved Turbine Engine Program as the new engine for existing and future Army rotorcraft. Based on S-97 and X2 performance, Raider X is expected to have a maximum speed exceeding 250 kn (460 km/h; 290 mph) with a service ceiling greater than 9,000 feet (2,700 m). Sikorsky considers the S-97 to be an 80% scale model of Raider X; Raider X is expected to weigh 14,000 lb (6,400 kg). Swift Engineering will design and build the fuselage.

The cockpit uses side-by-side seats instead of the tandem seating typical of American attack helicopters; internal weapons and sensors are mounted using a modular system, in accordance with FARA specifications, to anticipate future upgrades and obsolescence.

== Specifications (Raider X) ==
General characteristics

- Crew: two
- Powerplant: 1 × General Electric T901 turboshaft, 3,000 shp (2,200 kW) (main powerplant)
- Main rotor diameter: 2 × 39 ft (12 m)

Performance

== See also ==
Related development

- Sikorsky S-69
- Sikorsky X2
- Sikorsky S-97 Raider
- Sikorsky–Boeing SB-1 Defiant

Aircraft of comparable role, configuration, and era

- Bell 360 Invictus
