= Skyblazer (disambiguation) =

Skyblazer or Sky Blazer may refer to:

== Entertainment ==
- Sky Blazers (1939), an American radio program featuring youth-oriented dramatizations of the exploits of adventurous aviators, hosted by aviator Roscoe Turner and announcer Nelson Case
- Sky Blazer (1946–1967), a roller coaster at Savin Rock Amusement Park in West Haven, Connecticut, designed by Vernon Keenan
- Sky Blazer (video game) (1983), a horizontally scrolling shooter game for Atari 8-bit, a.k.a. Star Blazer on the Apple II
- Skyblazer (1994), a Japanese platform video game published by Sony Imagesoft, released for the Super Nintendo Entertainment System

== Aviation ==
- The Skyblazers (1949–1962), an aerial demonstration team of the United States Air Forces in Europe (USAF)
- F-15D Eagle 957 "Sky Blazer" (Hebrew: מרקיע שחקים, Markia Schakim), an Israeli aircraft involved in the 1983 Negev mid-air collision
- Phoenix Skyblazer, an American helicopter produced ca. 2013

== Other ==
- Salazar Tech Skyblazers, the academic sports program of the Salazar Colleges of Science and Institute of Technology (est. 1983), in the Philippines
