= Sikorsky S-97 Raider =

American high-speed scout and attack compound helicopter

S-97 Raider
- S-97 Raider in flight

General information
- Type: Reconnaissance and attack compound helicopter
- National origin: United States
- Manufacturer: Sikorsky Aircraft
- Status: Under development
- Number built: 3

History
- First flight: 22 May 2015
- Developed from: Sikorsky X2
- Developed into: Sikorsky Raider X

The Sikorsky S-97 Raider is a high-speed scout and attack compound helicopter based on the Advancing Blade Concept (ABC) with a coaxial rotor system under development by Sikorsky Aircraft. Sikorsky planned to offer it for the United States Army's Armed Aerial Scout program, along with other possible uses. The S-97 made its maiden flight on 22 May 2015.

== Development ==
=== Background ===
Sikorsky's earliest attempt at a fast compound helicopter with stiff coaxial rotors was the Sikorsky S-69 (XH-59A) flown in the 1970s. Its top speed was over 260 knots but its excessive fuel consumption, vibration and complexity requiring the full-time attention of two pilots led to the program's cancellation. These problems were largely solved on another attempt by the Sikorsky X2 technology demonstrator in 2010. First proposed in response to a Request for Information for the Armed Aerial Scout (AAS) program in March 2010, the S-97 was formally launched on 20 October 2010. It was intended as a contender for a United States Army's requirement to replace the Bell OH-58D Kiowa Warrior. Other military roles are possible, the U.S. Special Operations Command having expressed interest in the S-97 as a replacement for the MH-6 Little Bird, and the possibility of adapting it for civilian applications also exists.

=== S-97 ===
Sikorsky plans to build two prototypes of the S-97 as demonstrators. One prototype (P1) will be used for flight testing, while the second (P2) is planned for use as a demonstrator. The first prototype was planned to fly in late 2013 or early 2014. Sikorsky started construction of the two prototypes in October 2012. In September 2013, Sikorsky began final assembly of the first S-97 following delivery of the single-piece, all-composite fuselage by Aurora Flight Sciences. In February 2014, construction of the first S-97 prototype was one-quarter complete. Simulated bird strikes testing had been conducted on the fuselage at speeds of up to 235 kn (435 km/h; 270 mph), the S-97's expected maximum flight speed. Drop tests were also performed to ensure the fuel tanks' safety in the event of a crash. Sikorsky is exploring civil applications for the S-97, such as transporting personnel between offshore oil platforms.

Sikorsky and partner Boeing had planned to use the S-97's technology and design process as a basis to develop the now canceled SB-1 Defiant, a high-speed rigid rotor co-axial rotorcraft, for the army's Joint Multi-Role Technology Demonstrator (JMR TD) program. The JMR TD is the precursor to the army's estimated US$100 billion Future Vertical Lift (FVL) program to replace the UH-60 Black Hawk utility helicopter and AH-64 Apache attack helicopter.

Sikorsky targeted the S-97 for the AAS program, aiming for the helicopter to fly before the Army downselected. Sikorsky invested $150 million and its 54 suppliers (who provide 90% of the parts) spent the remainder of a total of $200 million on two prototypes; production models aim to meet the program's $15 million unit cost target. However, the Army ended the AAS program in late 2013. Budget projections for FY 2015 included retiring the U.S. Army's OH-58 Kiowa fleet and transferring AH-64 Apache attack helicopters from U.S. Army Reserve and U.S. Army National Guard to the active Army to perform the aerial scout role. Sikorsky suggested the possibility of buying the S-97 to replace lost Apache for armed helicopter needs. Sikorsky proposes S-97 as FVL-CS1; the light scout helicopter.

On 5 May 2014, Sikorsky opened the S-97 production hangar during the rollout of the CH-53K King Stallion. At that point, the mostly-composite airframe was almost assembled, including some of the electrical wiring and avionics, missing elements were the transmission, drive train, engine, coaxial rotor, and pusher propeller. The S-97's first military customer is aimed to be the U.S. Special Operations Command to replace the MH-6M Little Bird. Unspecified foreign militaries have shown interest in the S-97; it may be difficult to get approval for export for a next-generation helicopter if the US military does not yet have it. The Raider is a prototype, so the first customer would need to finance a production development program. Its avionics were powered on in June 2014, with rollout on 2 October 2014.

== Design ==
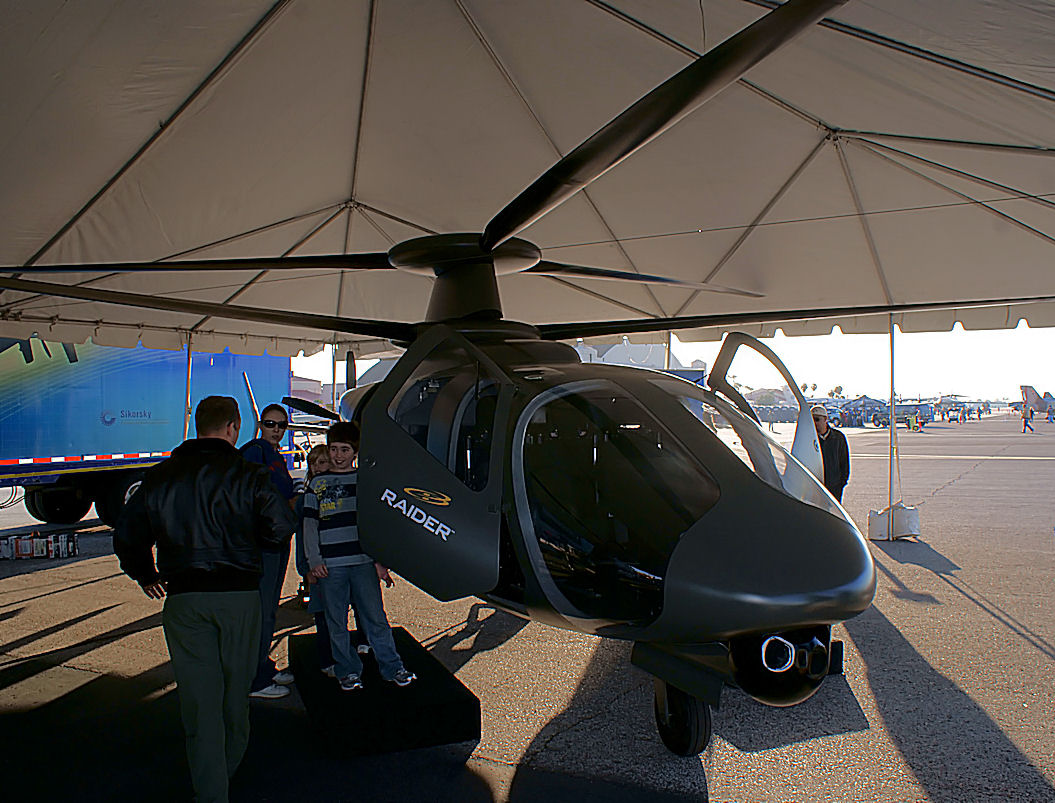
Mockup in October 2011

The S-97 design includes variable speed rigid coaxial main rotors and a variable-pitch pusher propeller, making the S-97 a compound helicopter. Like the X2, it has fly-by-wire control and dynamic anti-vibration actuators to cancel out shaking. The main rotors have hingeless hubs and stiff blades, to improve low-speed handling and efficiency of hover. At high speeds, the close spacing of the hubs reduces drag. The stiff blades allow each rotor to have low lift on the retreating side of its rotor disk (reducing drag), whereas each rotor on a conventional coaxial rotor with "floppy" blades needs nearly equal lift distribution. The propeller relieves the rotor of propulsion, further reducing drag.

Maneuverability is improved compared with earlier helicopters because of the ability to tilt the coaxial rotors together or tilt each one differently, and because of the variable pitch propulsor and active elevons. At low speed the S-97 yaws by differential torque of the upper and lower rotor, at high speed it uses rudders.

The S-97 will be capable of carrying up to six passengers, in addition to a flight crew of two in a side-by-side cockpit. However, the production S-97 is projected to be capable of flying with either one or two pilots, or autonomously. Space for a targeting sensor has been reserved, however it will not be installed in the prototype aircraft.

Based on the technology from the Sikorsky X2 demonstrator, the prototype S-97s will be powered by a General Electric YT706 turboshaft (the same engine used on the MH-60M Black Hawk). A more powerful engine, developed under the Improved Turbine Engine Program, is expected to become available. Compared to the OH-58D Kiowa, the S-97 has significantly increased performance goals, such as cruising speeds upwards of 200 knots while carrying weapons, turning at three times the force of gravity at 220kt, and a high hover efficiency (Figure of merit). Sikorsky also aims for an operating cost of $1,400 per flight hour.

== Operational history ==
The first flight of the S-97 occurred on 22 May 2015. It flew for 1 hour instead of the planned 30 minutes, completing three takeoffs and landings; forward, rearward and sideward. For this initial flight, the Raider was flown with its triplex fly-by-wire flight control system in backup degraded mode so as to focus on basic airworthiness in the low-speed regime. This begins a year-long flight test program of about 100 flight-hours to expand the flight envelope to meet Sikorsky's key targets of 220-knot cruise speed carrying weapons, hover at 6,000 feet on a 95F day and 3g maneuverability at speed. Toward the end of Phase 1 testing, software will be upgraded to Block 2, bringing in the propulsor and articulating tail to increase speed and enable the full flight envelope. The second prototype (P2) was displayed to the public in October 2015. After two flight hours and a few months of testbench validation of the propulsion drivetrain, P1 is scheduled for higher speed some time in 2016.

On 2 August 2017, an S-97 prototype suffered what Sikorsky described as a hard landing at their flight test facility in West Palm Beach, Florida; both airline transport pilots received minor injuries. The NTSB factual report on the incident stated that the helicopter lifted into a low hover and immediately experienced excessive roll oscillations which lead to intermeshing of the counter-rotating coaxial rotor system, and a hard landing. Damage to the helicopter included collapsed landing gear, structural cabin damage, and dynamic component damage, including rotor blade tip separation of all rotor blades. Video of the accident sequence showed aircraft roll oscillations exceeding 60–degree angle of bank during the course of 5 seconds, during which the upper and lower rotors collided at the 1 o'clock position.

On 25 June 2019, the S-97 returned to flight testing and reached a speed of 190 knots (350 km/h).

== Specifications ==
Data from

General characteristics

- Crew: 0–2 pilots
- Capacity: 6 troops
- Length: 35 ft (11 m)
- Gross weight: 8,945 lb (4,057 kg)
- Max takeoff weight: 11,000 lb (4,990 kg)
- Powerplant: 1 × General Electric YT706 , 2,600 shp (1,900 kW)
- Main rotor diameter: 1 (2 coaxial) × 34 ft (10 m)
- Propellers: 1 x 6-bladed variable-pitch, clutchable pusher propeller (7 ft (2.1 m) diameter)

Performance

- Cruise speed: 250 mph (410 km/h, 220 kn) (with external weapons)
- Never exceed speed: 280 mph (440 km/h, 240 kn)
- Range: 350 mi (570 km, 310 nmi)
- Endurance: 2 h 40 min
- Service ceiling: 10,000 ft (3,000 m) at 95 °F (35 °C)

Armament

- Guns: .50 cal gun with 500 rounds
- Rockets: 7-shot rocket pod(s)

== See also ==
Related development

- Sikorsky X2
- Sikorsky Raider X
- Sikorsky–Boeing SB-1 Defiant

Aircraft of comparable role, configuration, and era

- Bell 360 Invictus
- Bell ARH-70 Arapaho
- Eurocopter AS645
- Eurocopter X³
