= Bendix Helicopters =

- Company type: Subsidiary
- Industry: Aviation
- Founded: 1943
- Founder: Vincent Bendix
- Defunct: 1949
- Headquarters: Stratford, Connecticut
- Parent: Bendix Corporation

Bendix Helicopters, Inc. was the last company founded by prolific inventor Vincent Bendix, in 1943 in Connecticut. It ceased operations in 1949.

== History ==
It built a 10,000 square foot factory for helicopter production on East Main Street in Stratford, Connecticut in 1945.

Bendix created 3 prototypes that used a system of coaxial rotors: Model K (1945), Model L and Model J (1946).

Due to lack of sales and capital, in January 1947 the large factory building was sold to Manning, Maxwell and Moore, who were taken over by Dresser Industries in 1964.

In 1949, Bendix Helicopter was forced to close. In an auction the assets of the company were sold to the Gyrodyne Company of America on Long Island in New York. Gyrodyne continued development of several helicopter models introduced by Bendix.

== See also ==
- Bendix Trophy
- Defunct helicopter manufacturers of the United States
