= Eagle's Perch =

American helicopter

- The prototype Eagle's Perch

General information
- Type: Helicopter
- National origin: United States
- Manufacturer: Eagle's Perch Inc.
- Designer: Nolan brothers
- Status: Production completed
- Number built: At least one

History
- Variant: Phoenix Skyblazer

The Eagle's Perch was an American helicopter that was designed by the Nolan brothers and produced by Eagle's Perch Inc. of Carrollton, Virginia. Now out of production, when it was available the aircraft was supplied as a kit for amateur construction.

== Design and development ==
The design was intended to be a simplified helicopter. Constructed by two brothers with no prior aeronautical experience or skills it employed a unique coaxial, counter-rotating, fixed pitch rotor system with no collective control, but employed a rudder. To account for the fact that the aircraft could not autorotate after a power failure, it was equipped with two engines and could hover on either one. A ballistic parachute was optional.

The Eagle's Perch was designed to comply with the US Experimental - Amateur-built aircraft rules. The aircraft had a standard empty weight of 240 lb (109 kg). It featured two coaxial main rotors, a single-seat open cockpit without a windshield, skid-type landing gear and two twin-cylinder, air-cooled, two-stroke, dual-ignition 50 hp (37 kW) Hirth 2706 engines.

The aircraft fuselage was made from welded steel tubing. Its 13.5 ft (4.1 m) diameter two-bladed rotors were of a fixed pitch design. The aircraft had an empty weight of 480 lb (218 kg) and a gross weight of 800 lb (363 kg), giving a useful load of 320 lb (145 kg). With full fuel of 10 U.S. gallons (38 L; 8.3 imp gal) the payload for pilot and baggage was 260 lb (118 kg).

The manufacturer estimated the construction time from the supplied kit to be 240 hours.

The design was later developed into the Phoenix Skyblazer.

== Operational history ==
The design won Grand Champion Helicopter at the Popular Rotorcraft Association convention in 1994.

By July 2014 no examples remained registered in the United States with the Federal Aviation Administration and it is unlikely any exist today, although one, the prototype, had been registered at one time.

== Specifications (Eagle's Perch) ==
Data from Purdy

General characteristics

- Crew: one
- Length: 14 ft 0 in (4.27 m)
- Empty weight: 480 lb (218 kg)
- Gross weight: 800 lb (363 kg)
- Fuel capacity: 10 U.S. gallons (38 L; 8.3 imp gal)
- Powerplant: 2 × Hirth 2706 twin cylinder, air-cooled, two stroke aircraft engines, 50 hp (37 kW) each
- Main rotor diameter: 2 × 13 ft 6 in (4.11 m)
- Main rotor area: 286 sq ft (26.6 m^{2})

Performance

- Maximum speed: 80 mph (130 km/h, 70 kn)
- Cruise speed: 60 mph (97 km/h, 52 kn)
- Range: 100 mi (160 km, 87 nmi)
- Rate of climb: 3,000 ft/min (15 m/s)
- Disk loading: 2.80 lb/sq ft (13.7 kg/m^{2})

== See also ==
- List of rotorcraft
- List of single seat helicopters
