= Boeing A/MH-6X MELB =

Light helicopter gunship

Unmanned Little Bird MH-6X MELB / AH-6I
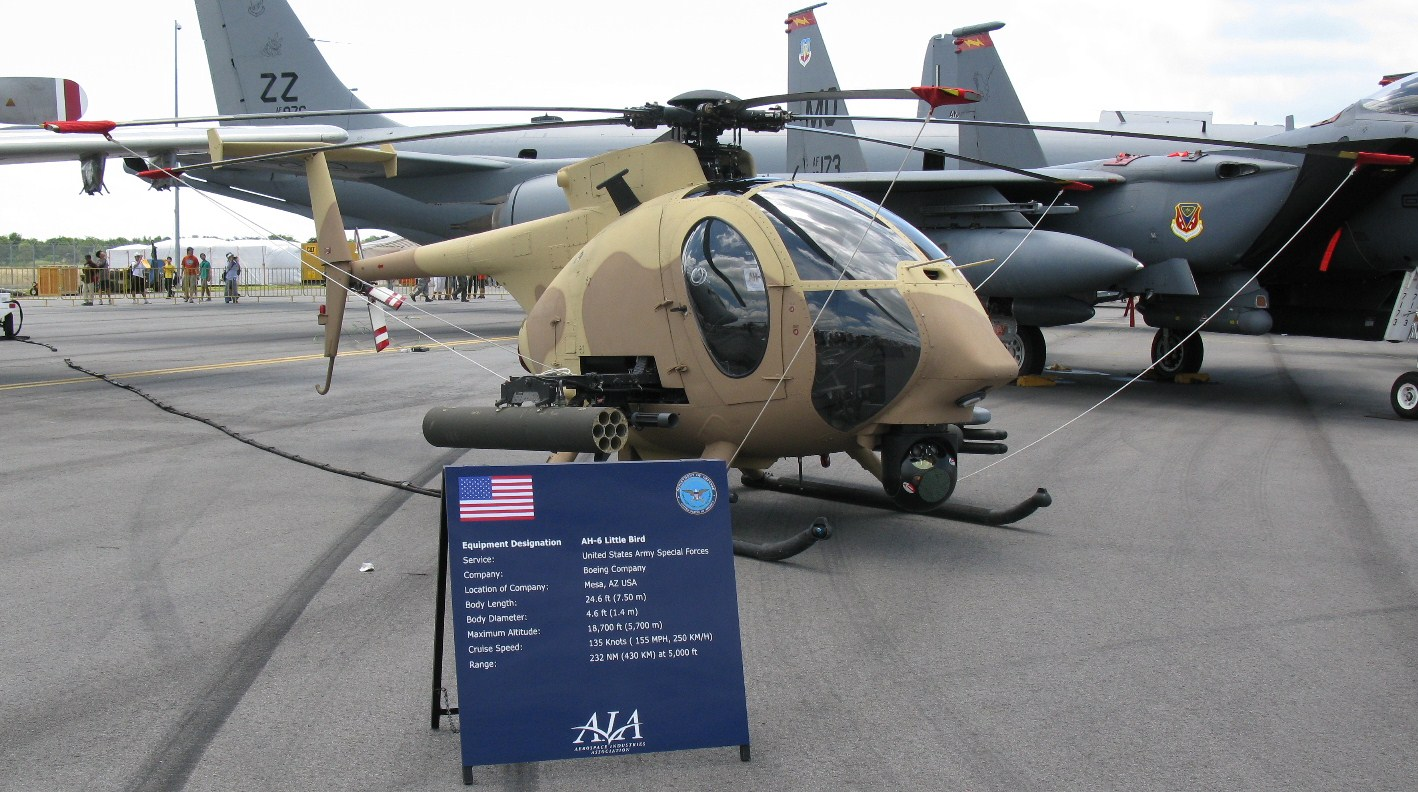
- A Boeing AH-6 on static display at the 2010 Singapore Airshow

General information
- Type: Light attack/reconnaissance helicopter
- National origin: United States
- Manufacturer: Boeing Rotorcraft Systems
- Status: Under development

History
- First flight: ULB: September 8, 2004; MELB: September 20, 2006
- Developed from: MD Helicopters MD 500; MD Helicopters MH-6 Little Bird

The Boeing AH-6 is a series of light helicopter gunships based on the MH-6 Little Bird and MD 500 family. Developed by Boeing Rotorcraft Systems, these include the Unmanned Little Bird (ULB) demonstrator, the A/MH-6X Mission Enhanced Little Bird (MELB), and the proposed AH-6I and AH-6S.

== Design and development ==
The Unmanned Little Bird demonstrator, which Boeing built from a civilian MD 530F, first flew on September 8, 2004, and made its first autonomous flight (with safety pilot) on October 16, 2004.

In April 2006, Boeing used the ULB to demonstrate the ability of another helicopter, in this case an AH-64 Apache to remotely control the ULB's weapons payload as a part of Boeing's Airborne Manned/Unmanned System Technology Demonstration (AMUST-D) program. For the initial test, the Apache Longbow was on the ground, while the ULB was airborne several miles away and Hellfire missiles were fired from the ULB by a tester sitting at the co-pilot's station in the Apache. Both aircraft are equipped with tactical common data link equipment and technologies manufactured by L-3 Communications.

The ULB Demonstrator first flew in the uncrewed mode on June 30, 2006 from the United States Army's Yuma Proving Ground, flying a pre-programmed 20-minute armed intelligence, surveillance and reconnaissance mission around the facility. All previous flights during the 450 flight hour engineering development phase had a safety pilot on board, although the aircraft was typically flown remotely from the ground.

With the successes of the ULB, Boeing incorporated its technologies into an A/MH-6, designating it the A/MH-6X. On September 20, 2006, the first A/MH-6X lifted off on its maiden flight from Boeing Rotorcraft Systems' Mesa, Arizona facility with a pilot on board. While the ULB Demonstrator had a payload of 2,400 pounds, the MELB has an additional 1,000 pounds of payload capacity. The A/MH-6X is similar to the A/MH-6M, but includes a prototype glass cockpit and a number of upgrades to the electronics and avionics. The A/MH-6X is an optionally crewed or uncrewed aircraft which is a hybrid of the ULB demonstrator and the A/MH-6M mission-enhanced Little Bird which is used by US Army Special Operations Command.

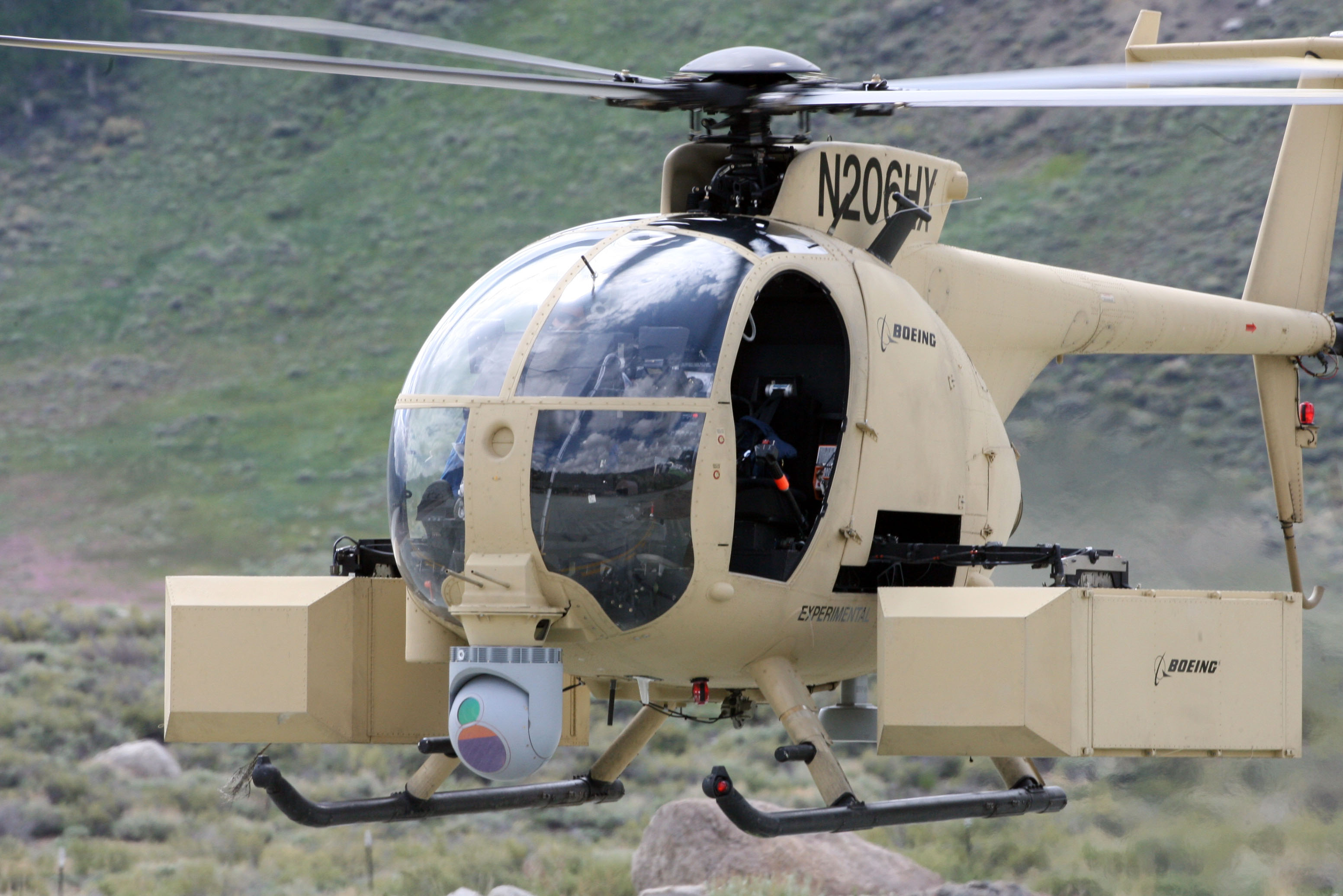
Unmanned Little Bird, 2009

Boeing funded the development program itself; it intends to market the aircraft for both military and homeland security roles within the U.S. and internationally. The aircraft is estimated to cost US$2 million. The systems related to the uncrewed flight capabilities have also been designed to be able to be installed in any other helicopter as well, including the Apache. An Unmanned Little Bird performed a fully autonomous flight in June 2010, including avoiding obstacles using LIDAR.

In 2009, it was reported that Boeing was working on the "AH-6S Phoenix" for the US Army's restarted ARH program, named Armed Aerial Scout. The AH-6S design is stretched by 15 inches (380 mm) to allow room for other ARH crew shot down in combat to be recovered. The aircraft also would feature an extended aerodynamic nose to house avionics hardware. AH-6S cockpit and main rotor composite blades are to be based the AH-64D Block III. The AH-6S will have an improved tail rotor and a more powerful Rolls-Royce 250-CE30 engine. The Little Bird has an endurance of 12 hours and carries a maximum mission payload of 2,400 lb (1,090 kg).

The AH-6i is the export version of the AH-6S. The AH-6i first flew on September 16, 2009. Jordan has expressed interest in ordering the AH-6i in May 2010. In October 2010 Saudi Arabia requested 36 AH-6i aircraft with related equipment and weapons from the United States through a Foreign Military Sale. Kaman Corporation is developing a retrofittable graphite epoxy rotorblade for the AH-6.

In summer 2011, an H-6U performed autonomous landings on a moving truck bed for French companies Thales and DCNS for France's General Directorate for Armament, in preparation for sea trials on a French frigate in 2012.

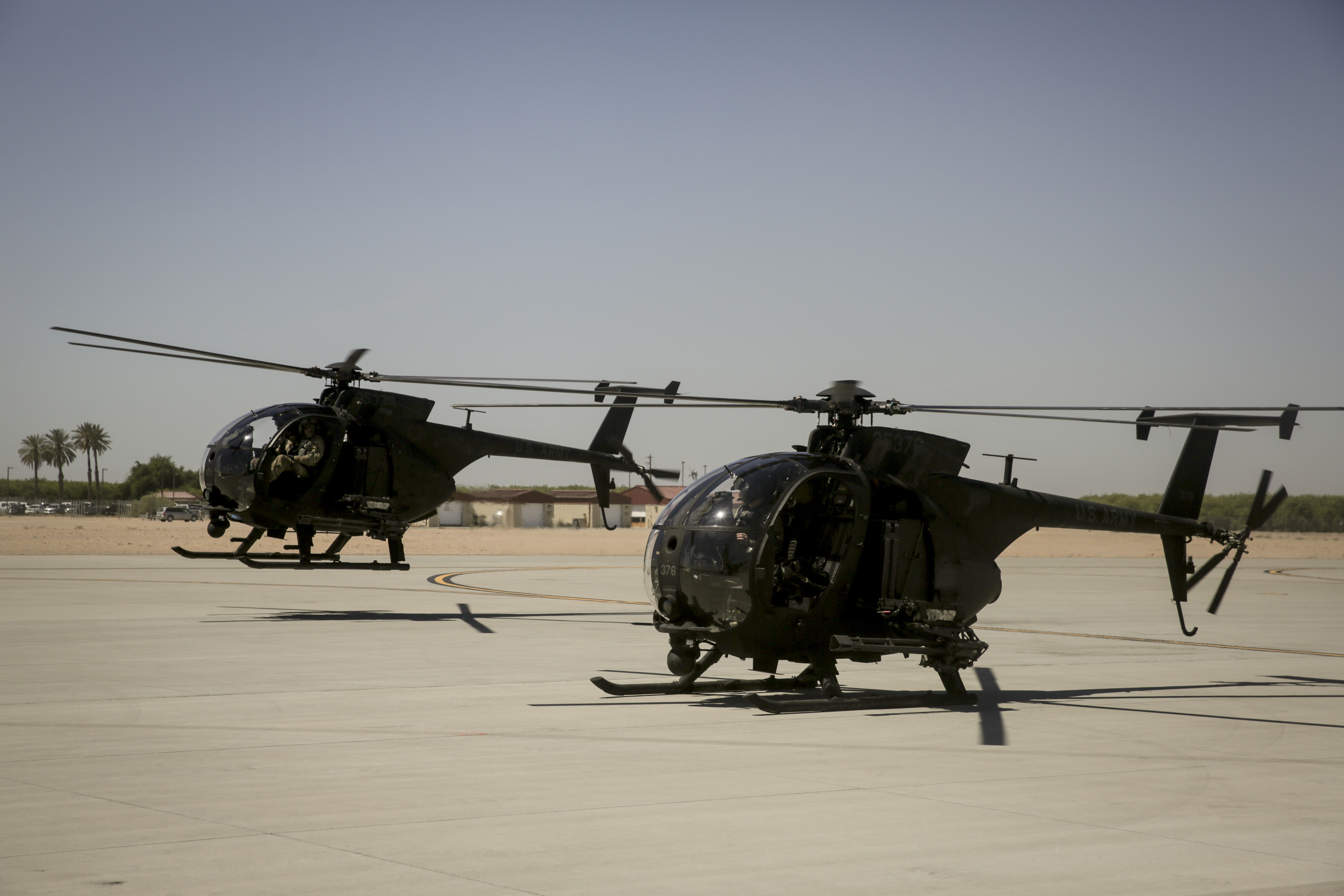
A/MH-6X Mission Enhanced Little Birds

In October 2012, the AH-6i completed a flight demonstration for the U.S. Army in anticipation of the Armed Aerial Scout program. While the AH-6i is aimed at international customers, Boeing intends to offer it for the program. The Army ended the AAS program in late 2013.

In December 2012, Boeing demonstrated the Unmanned Little Bird version of the AH-6 to the South Korean Army. The aircraft flew autonomously for 25 minutes to demonstrate the uncrewed system's capabilities that can be integrated into Army MD 500 Defender helicopters.

In September 2013, Aurora Flight Sciences and Boeing offered the H-6U Little Bird for the U.S. Marine Corps uncrewed lift intelligence surveillance and reconnaissance capability competition. Boeing, working as a subcontractor, was flying the Little Bird without human input, but with a pilot on board to comply with Federal Aviation Administration regulations during testing near Manassas, Virginia. The H-6U is competing against the uncrewed Kaman K-MAX, which has a usable external payload of 6,000 lb (2,720 kg) and has been used in theater to resupply Marines. Evaluations were to begin in February 2014 at Marine Corps Base Quantico.

Marines at Quantico announced they had successfully landed an uncrewed Little Bird, as well as a K-MAX, autonomously using a mini-tablet computer in April 2014. The helicopters were equipped with technology called the Autonomous Aerial Cargo/Utility System (AACUS), which combines advanced algorithms with LIDAR and electro-optical/infrared sensors to enable a person holding a tablet to select a point to land the helicopter at an unprepared landing site. Autonomous landing without the need for remote control or tele-operation reduces operator burden and allows them be resupplied or conduct other missions like medical evacuation around the clock. The AACUS weighs 100 lb (45 kg), so it can be easily integrated onto other aircraft like the CH-53E Super Stallion and V-22 Osprey. According to Rear Adm. Matthew Klunder, Chief of Naval Research, operational use of the system could be possible by 2015–2016. The Office of Naval Research selected Aurora Flight Sciences and the Unmanned Little Bird to complete development of the prototype AACUS system over Lockheed and the K-MAX.

== Operational history ==
AH-6I helicopters were used by the Saudi Arabian National Guard during the Saudi-led intervention in the Yemeni civil war; one was shot down by Houthi forces on 18 October 2026 near the Yemeni border in Najran, Saudi Arabia.

== Variants ==
Unmanned Little Bird (ULB)
UAV demonstrator
A/MH-6X Mission Enhanced Little Bird (MELB)
AH-6I
Version of the AH-6S for export.
AH-6S Phoenix
Proposed version of the AH-6 for the US Army's Armed Aerial Scout program.

== Operators ==
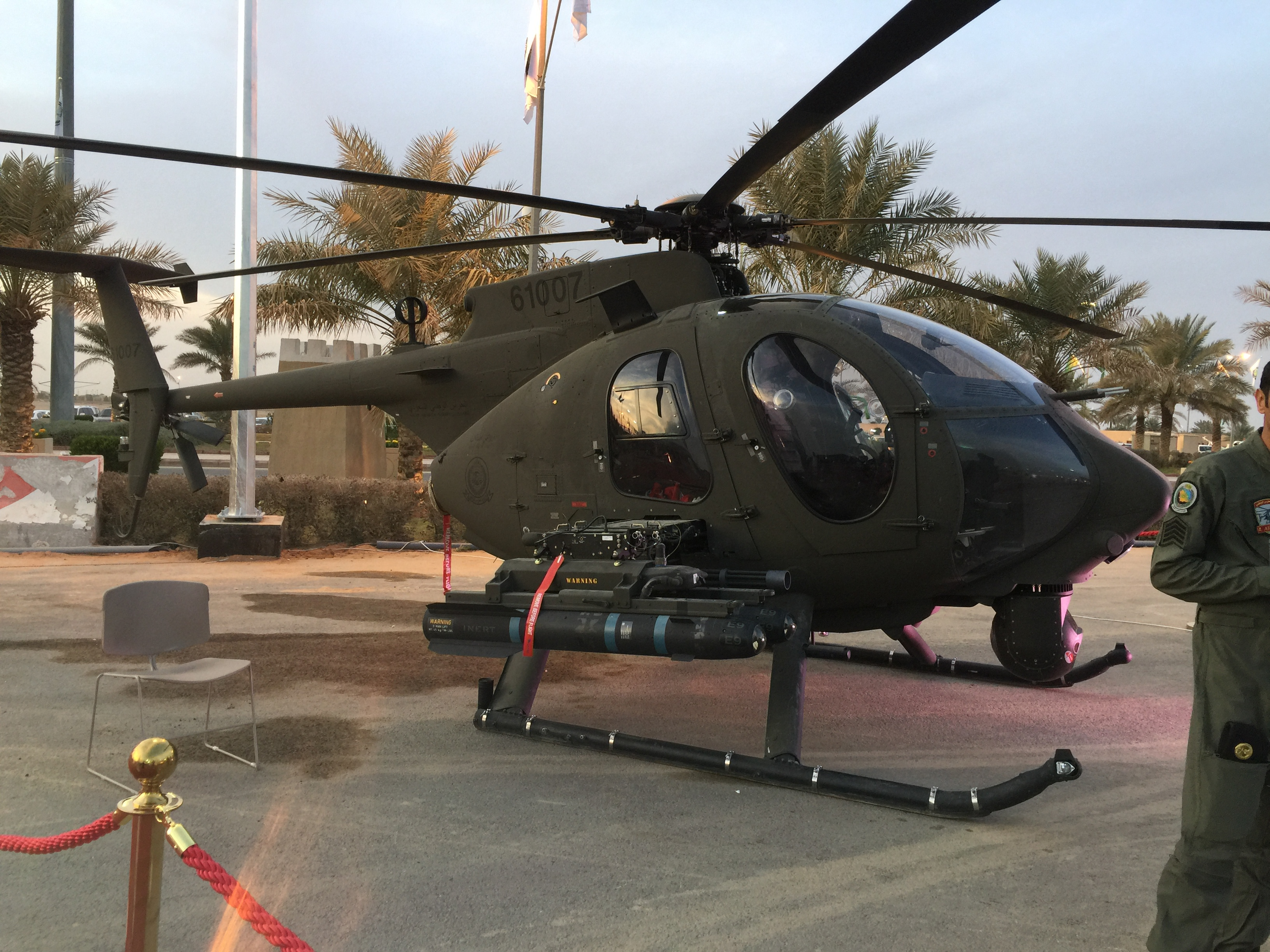
Saudi Arabian National Guard AH-6 Little Bird.

Jordan

- Royal Jordanian Air Force

Saudi Arabia

- Saudi Arabian National Guard (12, 24 on order)

Thailand

- Royal Thai Army (8 on order, contract worth US$103.8 million) Contract involves Korean Air on behalf of Boeing Defense, Space & Security (BDS). Sale officially confirmed on January 5, 2024. **Current Status (Deliveries First Batch Progres)

== Specifications (ULB/MD530F) ==
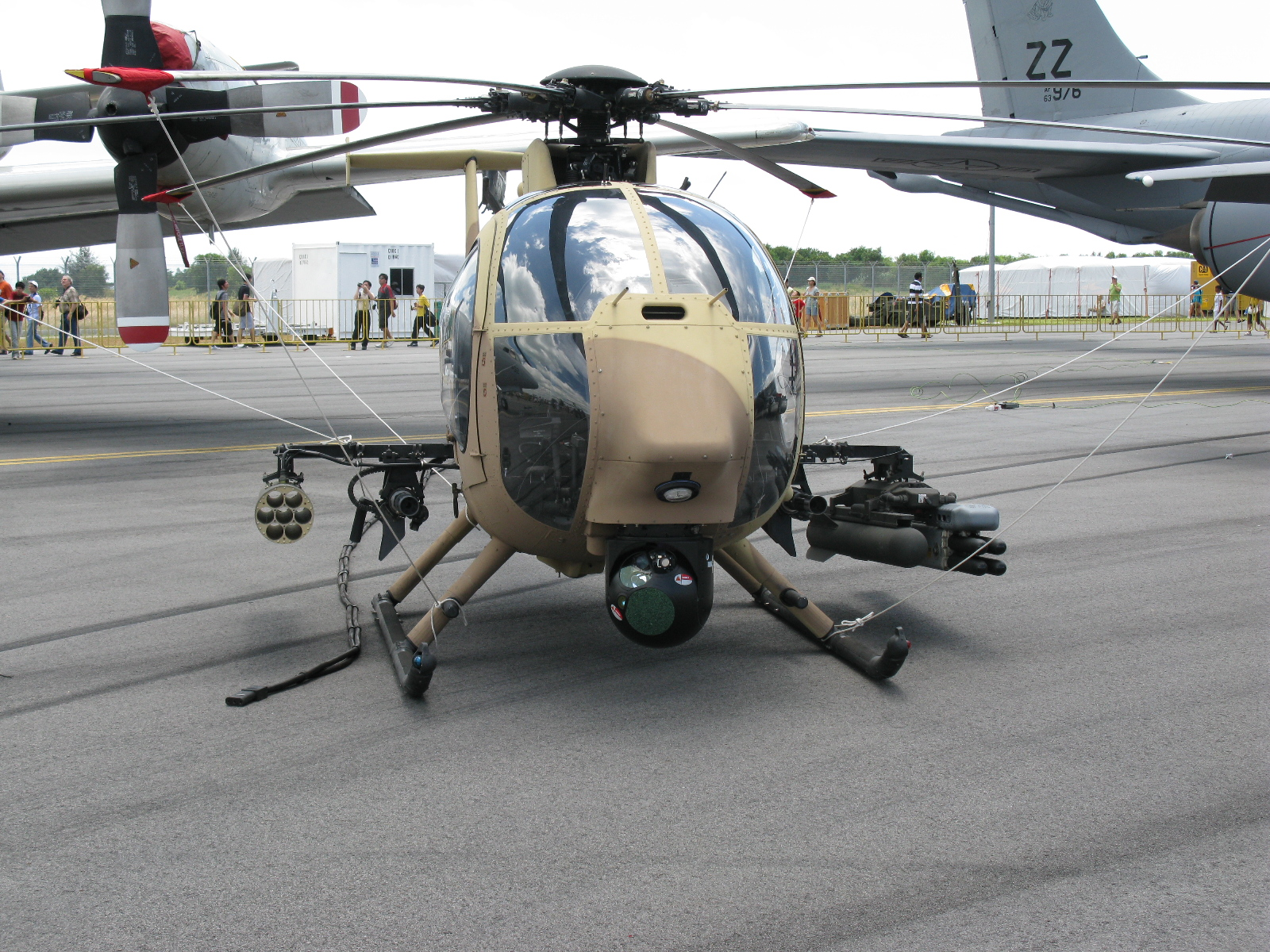
A fully loaded Boeing AH-6 Little Bird

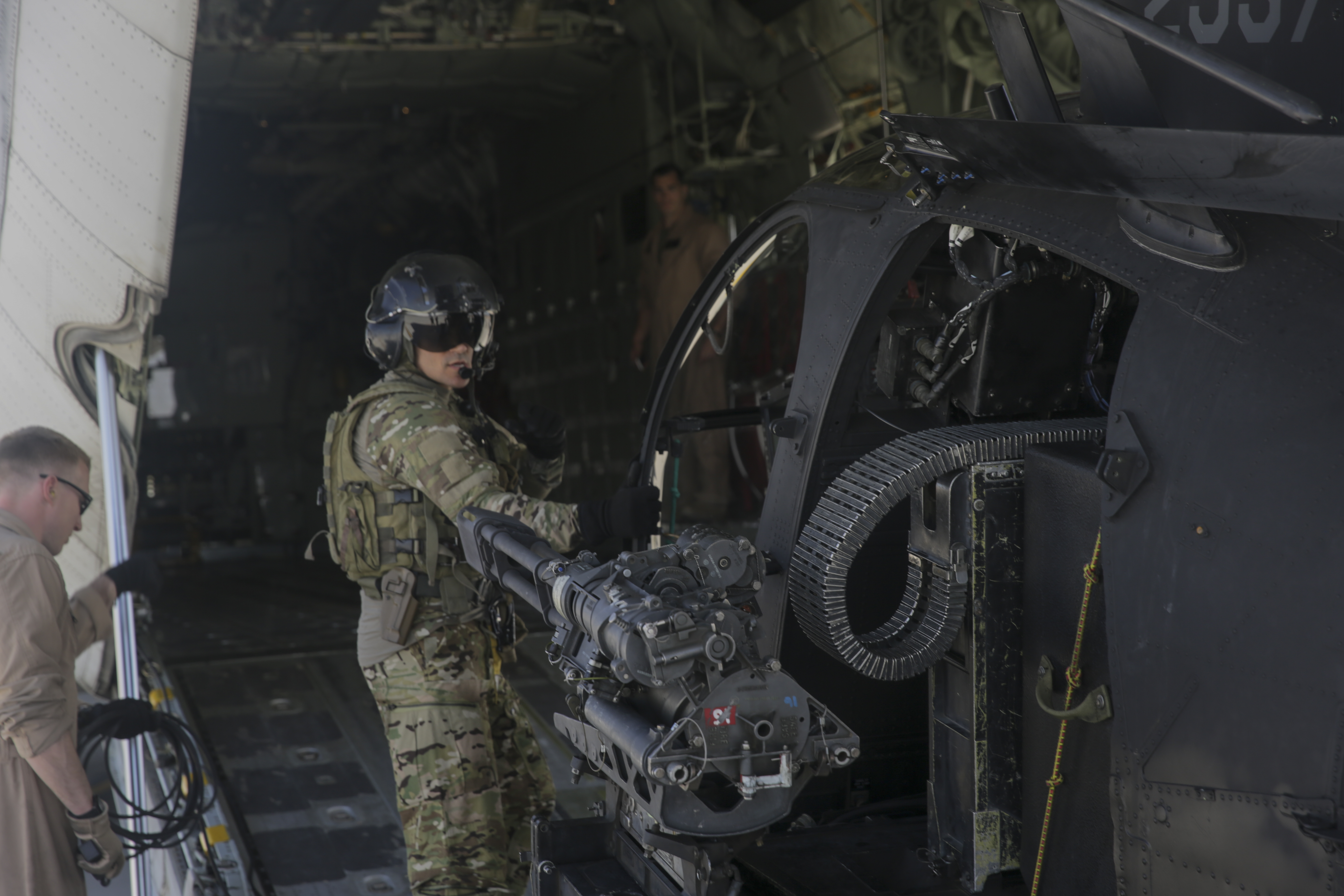
A/MH-6X with a GAU-19, being loaded into a KC-130J

Data from The International Directory of Civil Aircraft, MD 530F data

General characteristics

- Crew: 1–2
- Capacity: 5 total
- Length: 32 ft 7 in (9.94 m)
- Wingspan: 27 ft 4 in (8.33 m)
- Height: 8 ft 9 in (2.48 m)
- Wing area: 587.5 sq ft (54.6 m^{2})
- Empty weight: 1,591 lb (722 kg)
- Max takeoff weight: 3,550 lb (1,610 kg)
- Powerplant: 1 × One Allison 250-C30 turboshaft, 425 shp (317 kW) takeoff power (derated)

Performance

- Maximum speed: 152 kn (175 mph, 282 km/h)
- Cruise speed: 135 kn (155 mph, 250 km/h)
- Range: 232 nmi (267 mi, 430 km)
- Service ceiling: 18,700 ft (5,700 m)
- Rate of climb: 2,070 ft/min (10.5 m/s)

Armament

- Guns:
  - 2× 12.7 mm (.50 cal) GAU-19; or
  - 2× 7.62 mm (.30 cal) M134 Minigun
- Rockets:
  - 2× LAU-68D/A seven-tube rocket pods firing 2.75 in (70 mm) Hydra 70 or APKWS rocket projectiles
- Missiles:
  - Anti-tank guided missile: 2 or 4× AGM-114 Hellfire
  - Anti-air missile: 2 or 4× FIM-92 Stinger ATAS for self-defense

== See also ==
- U.S. helicopter armament subsystems

Related development

- Hughes OH-6 Cayuse
- MD Helicopters MD 500
- McDonnell Douglas MD 500 Defender
- MD Helicopters MH-6 Little Bird

Aircraft of comparable role, configuration, and era

- Bell OH-58 Kiowa
- Bell ARH-70
- Northrop Grumman MQ-8 Fire Scout
- Boeing A160 Hummingbird
