= Sikorsky–Boeing SB-1 Defiant =

Entry for the United States Army's Future Vertical Lift program

SB-1 Defiant
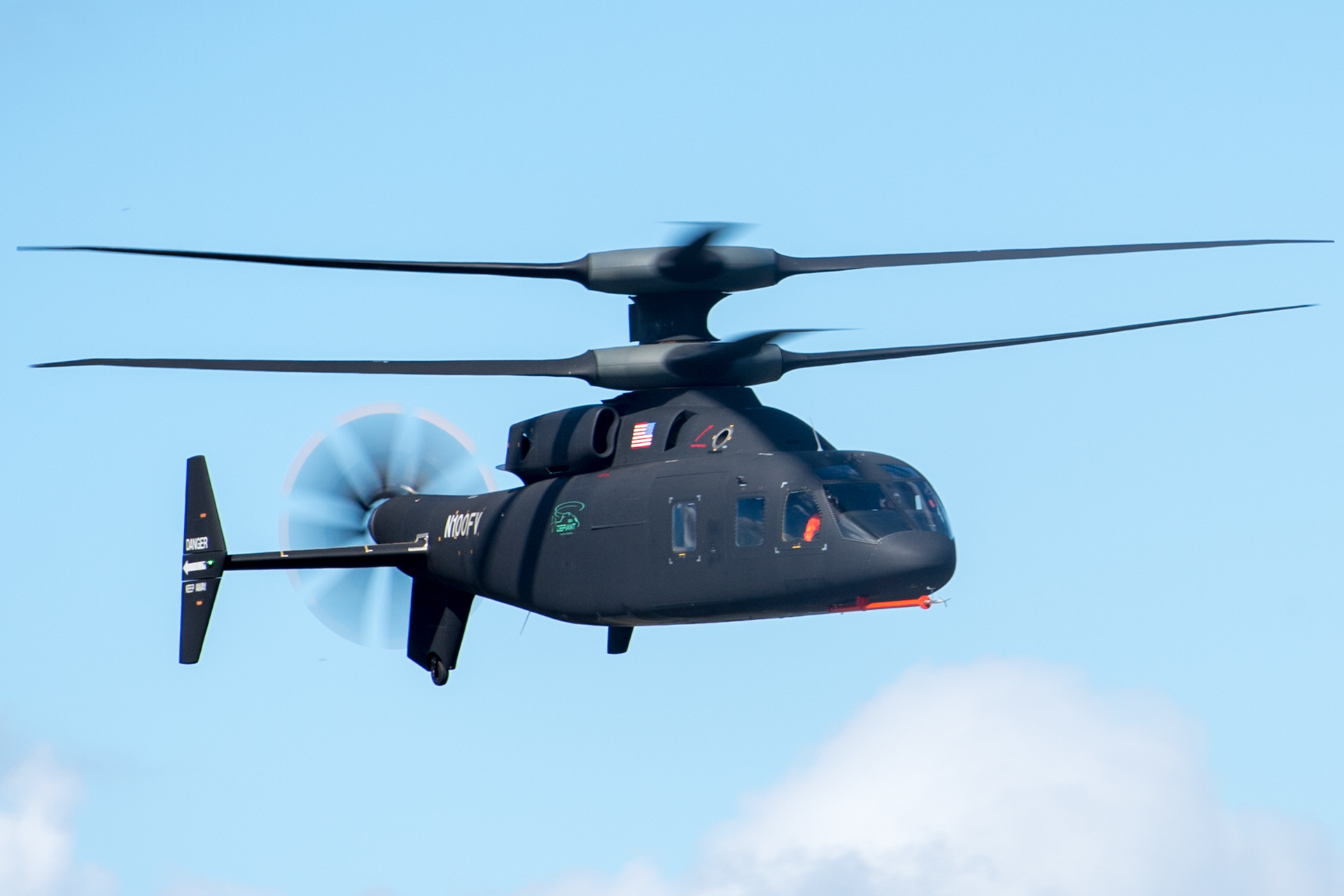
- Flight demonstration in February 2020

General information
- Type: Compound helicopter
- National origin: United States
- Manufacturer: Sikorsky Aircraft / Boeing
- Status: Not selected

History
- First flight: 21 March 2019

The Sikorsky–Boeing SB-1 Defiant (stylized as "SB>1"; company designation S-100) was the Sikorsky Aircraft and Boeing entry for the United States Army's Future Long-Range Assault Aircraft program to replace the Sikorsky UH-60 Black Hawk. It is a compound helicopter with rigid coaxial rotors, powered by two Honeywell T55 turboshaft engines. It first flew on 21 March 2019.

In December 2022, the U.S. Army selected the rival Bell V-280 Valor as the winner of the Future Long-Range Assault Aircraft program. The only existing SB>1 prototype now resides in the United States Army Aviation Museum.

== Development ==
Sikorsky Aircraft and Boeing are jointly producing a medium-lift-sized demonstrator they named SB>1 Defiant (also widely known as "SB-1") for phase one of the program. Originally planned to fly in late 2017, its first flight was delayed in April 2017 to early 2018. Sikorsky led the initial development phase one with an aircraft based on their previous Sikorsky X2 design while Boeing plans to led phase two, which is the mission systems demonstrator phase. The Boeing-Sikorsky team was seen to have an advantage with their large industrial base that may result in wider support from Congress alongside their transport helicopters being widely used by the U.S. Army.

Up to 2013, Sikorsky and partners spent $250 million on X2 and Raider with a separate team and aircraft from the S-97 Raider. The team named the suppliers in 2015. Swift Engineering Inc. supports the program with a major portion of the airframe structure designed and manufactured at the company's facility in San Clemente, California by an integrated team of Swift and Boeing employees.

The timeline for the first flight slipped several times. Originally scheduled for 2017, delays arose due to a requirement to implement automated fiber placement blade manufacture at the request of the U.S. Army. Further delays resulted in the first flight slipping past summer 2018. Dynamic systems such as turboshafts, transmission, and rotors were scheduled to be tested at West Palm Beach, Florida, by the end of October 2018, before ground runs in November, then first flight to reach 200 kn (370 km/h) within six months.

The first prototype was unveiled in December 2018, and the first flight was pushed to early 2019. Ground runs began in January 2019; 15 hours of ground tests were needed before the first flight.

The first flight took place on 21 March 2019 at Sikorsky West Palm Beach site in Florida. In the summer of 2019, flights were suspended to address a bearing issue with the main rotor. Flight testing resumed on 24 September 2019. The aircraft reached a speed of 211 knots during level flight in October 2020. By December 2020, the demonstrator had logged 26 flight hours in 31 flights over the 21 months since first flight. By October 2021, the demonstrator reached a top speed of 247 knots in level flight.

=== Defiant X variant ===
In January 2021, Sikorsky-Boeing announced the Defiant X variant, specifically designed for the Future Long-Range Assault Aircraft program. In February 2022, Sikorsky-Boeing picked Honeywell's new HTS7500 engine, a derivative of the Honeywell T55 engine that powered the SB-1 demonstrator, as the powerplant. In March 2022, Sikorsky-Boeing has selected Collins Aerospace to provide all three seating platforms and its Perigon as flight control computer.

== Design ==
Sikorsky and Boeing state the design has a cruise speed of 250 kn (460 km/h), but less range due to using the earlier T55 engine. However, when combined with the Future Affordable Turbine Engine (FATE), the SB-1 was expected to meet the radius requirement of 229 nmi (264 mi; 424 km). Compared to conventional helicopters, the contra-rotating coaxial main rotors and pusher propeller offer a 185-knot (213 mph; 343 km/h) speed increase, a 60% combat radius extension, and 50% better performance in high-hot hover operations. Vertical Magazine described the SB-1 lifting a 5,300-pound (2,400 kilogram) training load as part of its testing regime. The article also discussed the SB-1 as being the prototype of the Defiant X future is advertised as having a carrying capacity of 12 troops, or 3,680 pounds (1,669 kg) of cargo.

Sikorsky has said that the X2 design is not suitable for heavy-lift size, and instead suggests the CH-53K for heavy-lift and tiltrotor for the ultra-class. However, Sikorsky plans to build the 30,000-pound-class (14,000 kg) JMR-TD (with a cabin 50% larger than the UH-60) at full scale to remove doubts about the scalability of the X-2 technology.

Sikorsky–Boeing stated the SB-1 will be quick and nimble, with fast acceleration and deceleration, fast side-to-side movement, and the capability to hover with the tail up and nose down. The Defiant demonstrator will be powered by the Honeywell T55, which powers the CH-47 Chinook. It will be slightly modified to better operate at slower propeller speeds, down to 85% rpm.

== See also ==
- Future Vertical Lift

Related development

- Sikorsky S-69
- Sikorsky S-97 Raider
- Sikorsky Raider X
- Sikorsky X2

Aircraft of comparable role, configuration, and era

- Bell V-280 Valor
