= Armed Aerial Scout =

US Army helicopter program

General information
- Project for: Armed scout helicopter
- Issued by: United States Army

History
- Outcome: Canceled
- Predecessors: Armed Reconnaissance Helicopter
- Successors: Future Attack Reconnaissance Aircraft

The Armed Aerial Scout (AAS) was the planned replacement for the OH-58 Kiowa in United States Army service. This program resulted after the Armed Reconnaissance Helicopter resulted in selection of the Bell ARH-70 Arapaho, but was ultimately not procured due to financial and other reasons, and the AAS program itself did result in a new design procurement. The next program led to the Future Attack Reconnaissance Aircraft, which was also halted before procurement. Meanwhile the OH-58 was retired by the 2020s, leaving the Army to fill the gap with other types of aircraft and systems.

== History ==
The Armed Aerial Scout program replaced the previous Armed Reconnaissance Helicopter program, which chose the Bell ARH-70 Arapaho that was canceled due to cost overruns. An Analysis of Alternatives was conducted and a Request for Proposals was planned to be issued in 2014. The U.S. Army had until December 2012 to decide whether to proceed with the program. On 29 November 2012, Army officials decided to proceed with the Armed Aerial Scout program to acquire a new scout helicopter. On 8 January 2013, the Army began redrafting the presentation for the service's vice chief of staff before they move ahead with a competition. Vice Chief of Staff General Lloyd Austin III requested more data from the voluntary flight demonstrations done on helicopter entries, as well as taking into account the pace of other technologies, such as unmanned capabilities and future sensors. The Army concluded that its decision for the AAS program would result in either a new development effort or a service life-extension program (SLEP) for the OH-58F Kiowa.

Evaluations of commercial off-the-shelf designs were made from voluntary flight demonstrations in 2012. The five candidates included the OH-58F Block II, AH-6i, AAS-72X/X+, MD 540F, and AW139M (used for demonstration, with AW169 AAS offered as candidate). The Sikorsky S-97 Raider was offered, but no prototype was available for demonstration. Army evaluations concluded that no current aircraft met requirements. A decision on the Armed Aerial Scout program was expected "in late summer or early fall" 2013. Boeing had attempted to stop MD Helicopters from offering its MD 540F in the program, as it shared the same airframe design as Boeing's AH-6. In July 2013, MD Helicopters was allowed to continue to promote its offering in the program.

In October 2013, the Army said that the AAS program was at risk of being delayed or canceled due to sequestration cuts. The Armed Aerial Scout program ended in late 2013 with no alternative scout helicopter being selected for procurement. In 2012, Army leaders had thought a new aircraft was the best option. After sequestration in early 2013, the expected $16 billion cost of a new armed scout helicopter fleet was concluded to be too much. The Army then moved on with considerations for scrapping the entire OH-58 Kiowa fleet and moving more AH-64E Apache Guardian attack helicopters to the active Army for use in the scouting role. AAS requirements for a scout helicopter with increased speed, range, payload, and the ability to fly 6,000 ft (1,800 m) high at 35 °C (95 °F) temperatures will remain and whether one will be bought will depend on aircraft availability and Army funds. Even if the competition is not reopened, the Army will develop a new scout helicopter as part of the Future Vertical Lift program.

== Contenders ==
EADS AAS-72X concept

AVX's Kiowa Warrior-based concept

Contenders have included:

AAS-72X

- In October 2010 a consortium of EADS North America, American Eurocopter and Lockheed Martin announced that it was preparing to fly the first of three AAS-72X prototypes. The design is in the same family as the Eurocopter UH-72 Lakota.

Bell OH-58F Block II

- Upgrade of the current Kiowa Warrior.

Boeing AH-6S

- Improved version of the MH-6 Little Bird

AgustaWestland AW109

- Multipurpose light helicopter

Sikorsky S-97 Raider

- In May 2009, Sikorsky unveiled a mock-up of its X2-based contender later given the company's S-97 designation.

OH-58D/AVX

- Proposed by the AVX Aircraft Company is a modification of the current OH-58D design to meet the AAS requirement. The design uses the basic Kiowa fuselage and adds a counter-rotating coaxial rotor and two ducted fans.

=== Contenders by 2012 ===
Candidate helicopters for interim replacement were to conduct flight demonstrations in spring 2012.

The contenders as of June 2012 were:

- AgustaWestland AW139M - changed to AgustaWestland AW169 AAS
- Boeing AH-6
- EADS AAS-72X and AAS-72X+
- Bell OH-58F Block II
- Sikorsky S-97 Raider
- MD Helicopters MD 540F
