= Manning, Maxwell and Moore =

Manning, Maxwell and Moore was a railroad equipment supply manufacturing company that was based in Bridgeport, Connecticut. It was founded by Charles Arthur Moore in 1905.

The company manufactured pressure gauges, valves, cranes, and hoists.

== History ==
They purchased the Bendix Helicopters factory in 1945, located in Stratford, Connecticut.

Dresser Industries acquired Manning, Maxwell and Moore, Inc. in 1964.

== See also ==
- Mary Elsie Moore — daughter of Charles Arthur Moore.
