= Sikorsky S-69 =

US experimental co-axial compound helicopter

S-69/XH-59
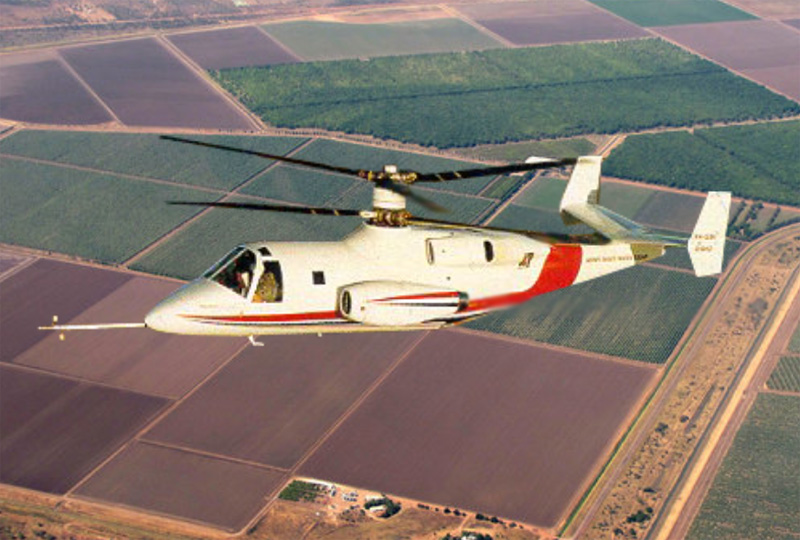
- Sikorsky S-69/XH-59A with auxiliary turbojets

General information
- Type: Experimental compound helicopter
- National origin: United States
- Manufacturer: Sikorsky Aircraft
- Primary users: NASA United States Army
- Number built: 2

History
- First flight: July 26, 1973
- Retired: 1981

The Sikorsky S-69 (military designation XH-59) is an American experimental compound helicopter developed by Sikorsky Aircraft as the demonstrator of the co-axial Advancing Blade Concept (ABC) with United States Army and NASA funding.

== Development ==
In late 1971, the Army Air Mobility Research and Development Laboratory, which later became a part of the Army Research Laboratory, awarded Sikorsky a contract for the development of the first prototype. The S-69 was the demonstrator for the Advancing Blade Concept (ABC).

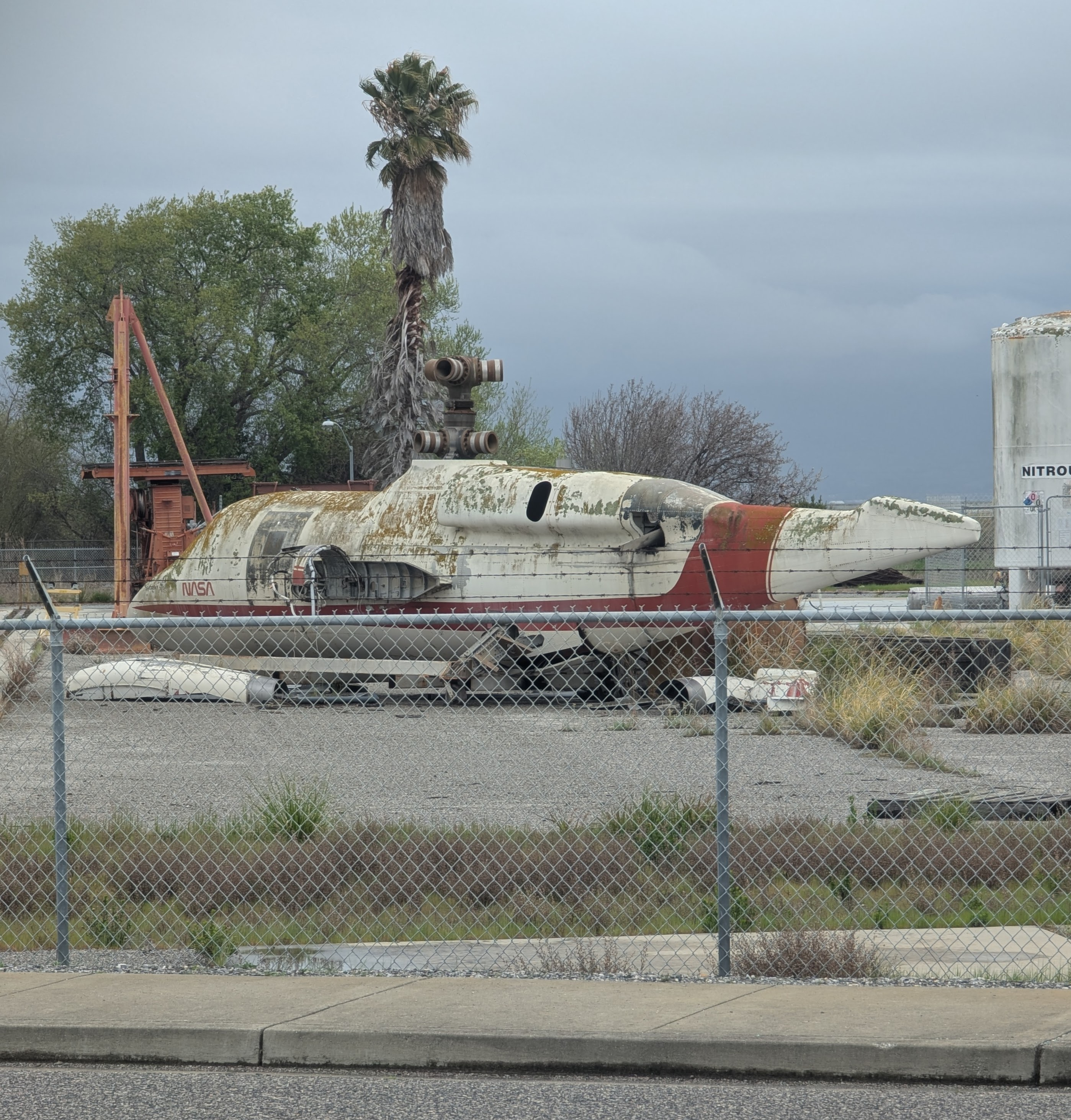
The remains of the first S-69 airframe, which was converted into a wind tunnel testbed.

The first S-69 built (73-21941) first flew on July 26, 1973. However, it was badly damaged in a low-speed crash on August 24, 1973 due to unexpected rotor forces and insufficient control systems. The airframe was then converted into a wind tunnel testbed, which was tested in the NASA Ames Research Center 40x80 feet full-scale wind tunnel in 1979. A second airframe was completed (73-21942) which first flew on July 21, 1975. After initial testing as a pure helicopter, two auxiliary turbojets were added in March 1977. As a helicopter, the XH-59A demonstrated a maximum level speed of 156 knots (289 km/h; 180 mph), but with the auxiliary turbojets, it demonstrated a maximum level speed of 238 knots (441 km/h; 274 mph) and eventually a speed of 263 knots (487 km/h; 303 mph) in a shallow dive. At 180 knots (333 km/h; 207 mph) level flight, it could enter a 1.4 g bank turn with the rotor in autorotation, increasing rotor rpm. Airframe stress prevented rotor speed reduction and thus full flight envelope expansion. The XH-59A had high levels of vibration and fuel consumption.

The 106-hour test program for the XH-59A ended in 1981. In 1982 it was proposed that the XH-59A be converted to the XH-59B configuration with advanced rotors, new powerplants (two GE T700s), and a ducted pusher propeller at the tail. This proposed program did not proceed as Sikorsky refused to pay a share of the costs. Sikorsky and its partners funded the development of the next helicopters using the Advancing Blade Concept, the Sikorsky X2 and Sikorsky S-97 Raider, from 2007.

== Design ==
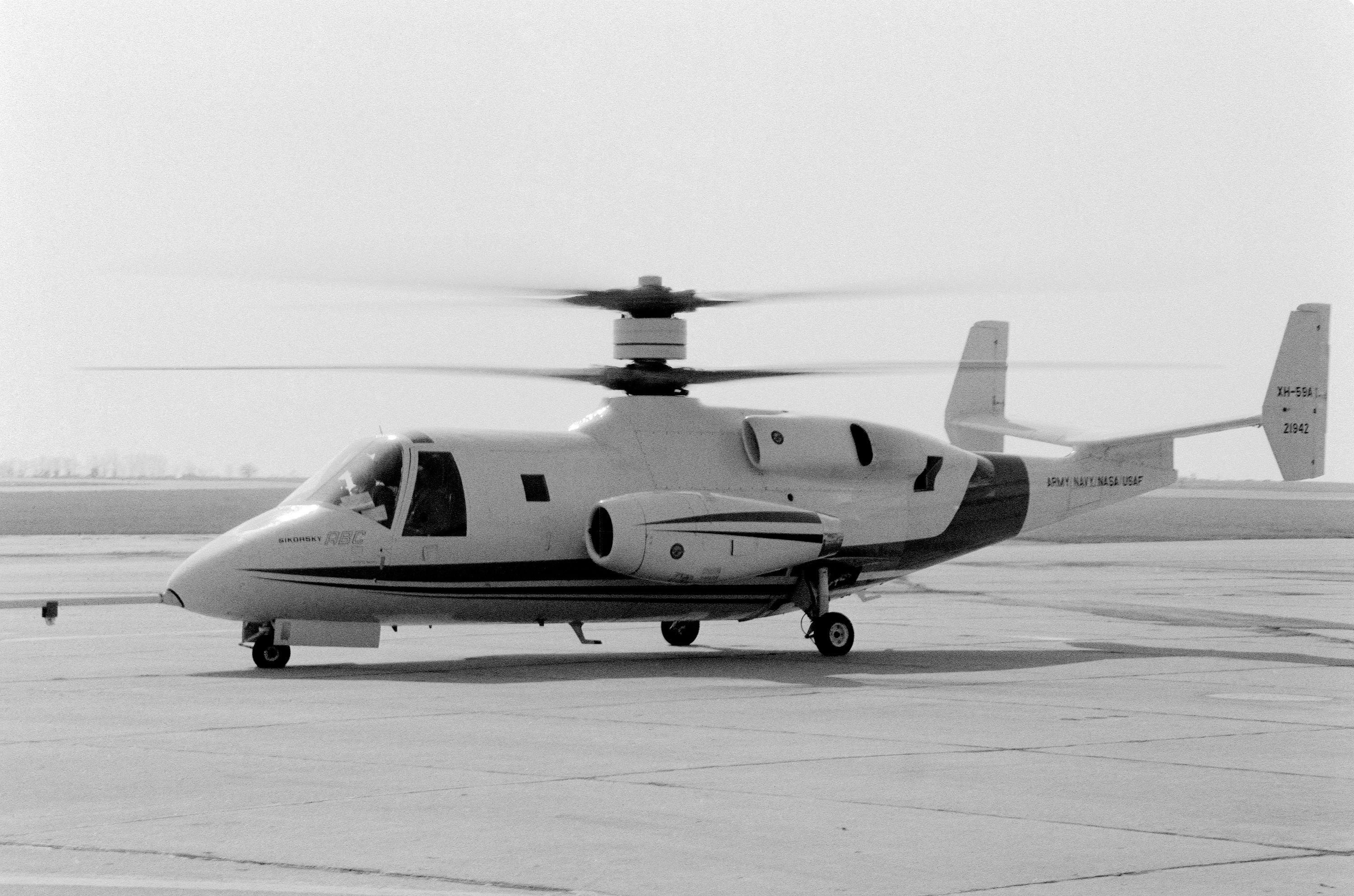
XH-59A

The Advancing Blade Concept system consisted of two rigid, contra-rotating rotors (30 inches apart) which made use of the aerodynamic lift of the advancing blades. At high speeds, the retreating blades were offloaded, as most of the load was supported by the advancing blades of both rotors and the penalty due to stall of the retreating blade was thus eliminated. This system did not require a wing to be fitted for high speeds and to improve maneuverability, and also eliminated the need for an anti-torque rotor at the tail. Forward thrust was provided by two turbojets, which allowed the main rotor to only be required to provide lift. It was found to have good hover stability against crosswind and tailwind. With jets installed, it lacked power to hover out of ground effect and used short take-off and landing for safety reasons.

== Surviving aircraft ==
Airframe 73-21941 is in storage at the NASA Ames Research Center and 73-21942 is on display at the Army Aviation Museum, Fort Rucker, Alabama.

== Specifications (S-69) ==
Data from U.S. Army Aircraft Since 1947, The Illustrated Encyclopedia of Helicopters, US Army Research Laboratory

General characteristics

- Crew: 2
- Length: 40 ft 9 in (12.42 m)
- Height: 13 ft 2 in (4.01 m)
- Gross weight: 12,500 lb (5,670 kg)
- Max takeoff weight: 11,000 lb (4,990 kg) with turbojets

9,000 lb (4,082 kg) without turbojets

- Powerplant: 1 × Pratt & Whitney Canada PT6T-3 Turbo Twin Pac turboshaft engine, 1,825 shp (1,361 kW)

or 1,500 hp (1,119 kW)

- Powerplant: 2 × Pratt & Whitney J60-P-3A turbojet engines, 3,000 lbf (13 kN) thrust each
- Main rotor diameter: 2 × 36 ft 0 in (10.97 m)
- Main rotor area: 2,036 sq ft (189.2 m^{2})

2× three-bladed co-axial rotors, with 30 in (762 mm) separation, turning at 345 rpm

- Blade section: root: NACA 63(230)-224A; tip: NACA 23012(64)

Performance

- Maximum speed: 263 kn (303 mph, 487 km/h) with turbojets

156 kn (180 mph; 289 km/h) without turbojets

- Cruise speed: 109 kn (125 mph, 202 km/h)
- Service ceiling: 25,000 ft (7,600 m) with turbojets

15,000 ft (4,572 m) without turbojets

- Rate of climb: 1,200 ft/min (6.1 m/s) at 140 kn (161 mph; 259 km/h)

== See also ==
Related development

- Sikorsky X2
- Sikorsky S-97 Raider
- Sikorsky–Boeing SB-1 Defiant
- Sikorsky Raider X

Aircraft of comparable role, configuration, and era

- Sikorsky S-72

Related lists

- List of helicopters
