= Future Long-Range Assault Aircraft =

US Army helicopter development program initiated in 2019

Future Long-Range Assault Aircraft (FLRAA)
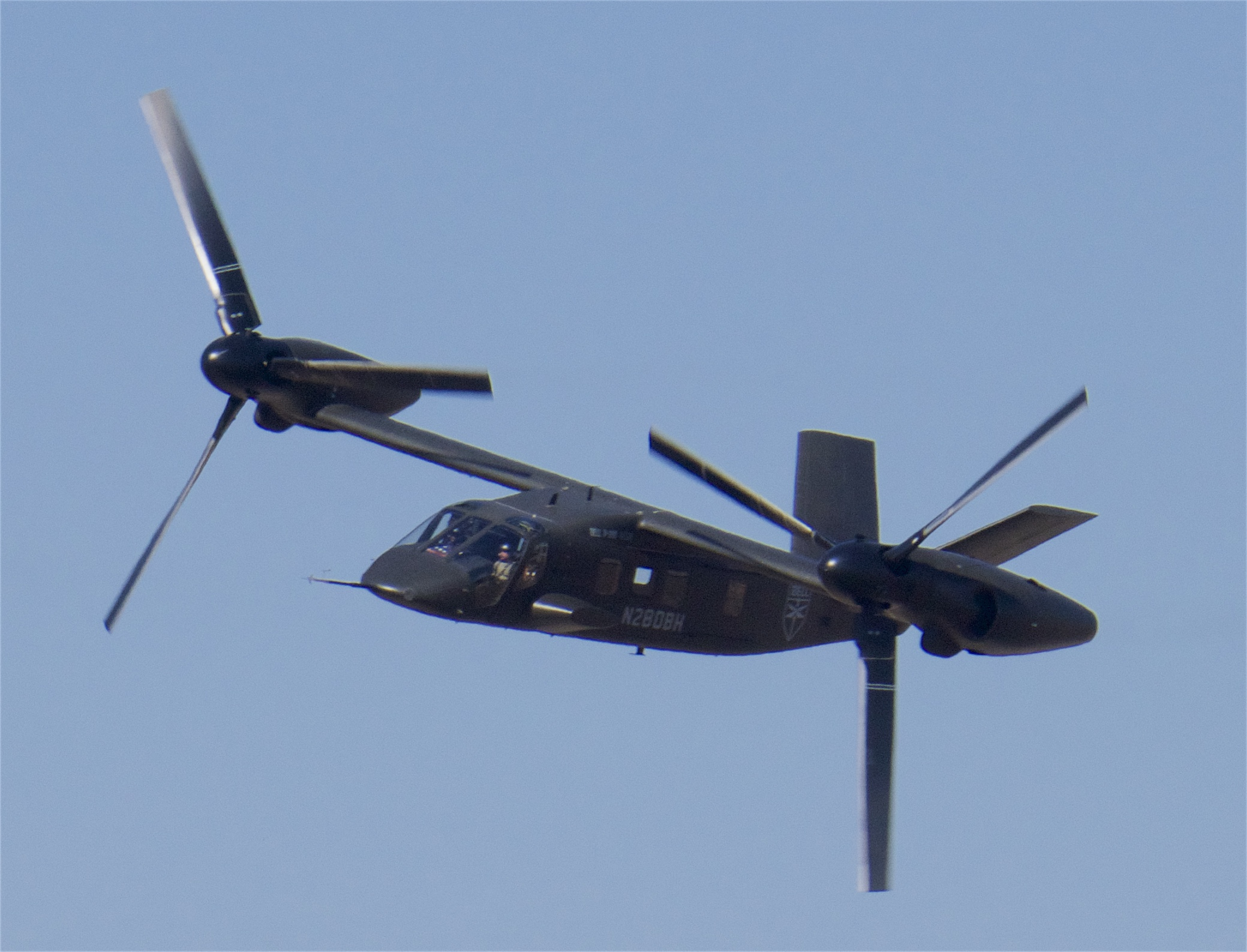
- A Bell V-280 in high-speed cruise configuration

General information
- Project for: Utility/Assault helicopter
- Issued by: United States Army
- Prototypes: Bell V-280 Valor; Sikorsky-Boeing SB-1 Defiant

History
- Outcome: Bell V-280 Valor selected
- Related: Future Vertical Lift (FVL); Future Attack Reconnaissance Aircraft (FARA) later cancelled

The Future Long-Range Assault Aircraft (FLRAA) program was initiated by the United States Army in 2019 to develop a successor to the Sikorsky UH-60 Black Hawk utility helicopter as part of the Future Vertical Lift program. The UH-60, developed in the early 1970s, has been in service since June 1979. Like the UH-60, FLRAA variants would also serve United States Special Operations Command and the United States Marine Corps. Under the existing Joint Multi-Role Technology Demonstrator (JMR-TD) program, the Army has been gathering data from flying prototype designs that could fill the FLRAA role.

The Army posted a request for information (RFI) in April 2019, which was intended to identify interested manufacturers. According to the RFI, the Army plans to bring the FLRAA into service in 2030, in anticipation of retiring the UH-60 after a 50-year life.

On December 5, 2022, the Army selected the Bell Textron V-280 Valor powered by Rolls-Royce engines for the FLRAA contract award. The award was protested by the Sikorsky-Boeing team, however the Government Accountability Office denied the protest.

== Design goals ==
According to the RFI, the Army has set a per-unit cost goal of $43 million (in 2018 dollars). The Army envisions combat scenarios where a future scout helicopter being developed under the Future Attack Reconnaissance Aircraft (FARA) program and unmanned drones would control an area or corridor, which would then allow FLRAA to insert troops. FLRAA is intended to be more agile and faster than the existing UH-60.

FLRAA Requirements (April 2019)
Attribute	Minimum		Desired	
Attribute	Army	USMC	Army	USMC
Unrefueled Combat Radius	200 nmi (370 km; 230 mi)	365 nmi (676 km; 420 mi) (Note: With 30 minute loiter at max payload, using specified mission profiles.)	300 nmi (560 km; 350 mi)	450 nmi (830 km; 520 mi)
One-way Unrefueled Radius	1,725 nmi (3,195 km; 1,985 mi)	—	2,440 nmi (4,520 km; 2,810 mi)	—
Maximum Continuous Cruise Speed (Note: Specified as true airspeed)	250 kn (460 km/h; 290 mph)	275 to 305 kn (509 to 565 km/h; 316 to 351 mph) (Note: Lower value at 90% maximum continuous power. Higher value at 100% intermediate rated power using specified mission profile.)	280 kn (520 km/h; 320 mph)	295 to 330 kn (546 to 611 km/h; 339 to 380 mph)
Payload (internal)	Cabin floor capable of 300 lb/ft^{2} (1,500 kg/m^{2})	4,400 lb (2,000 kg) (Note: Includes 12 personnel: 8 troops, 2 pilots, and 2 crew)	Cabin floor capable of 300 lb/ft^{2} (1,500 kg/m^{2})	5,200 lb (2,400 kg)
Passengers (Note: Requirement in addition to aircraft crew.)	12 (Note: 365 lb (166 kg) assumed per passenger)	8	12	8

== Competition history ==
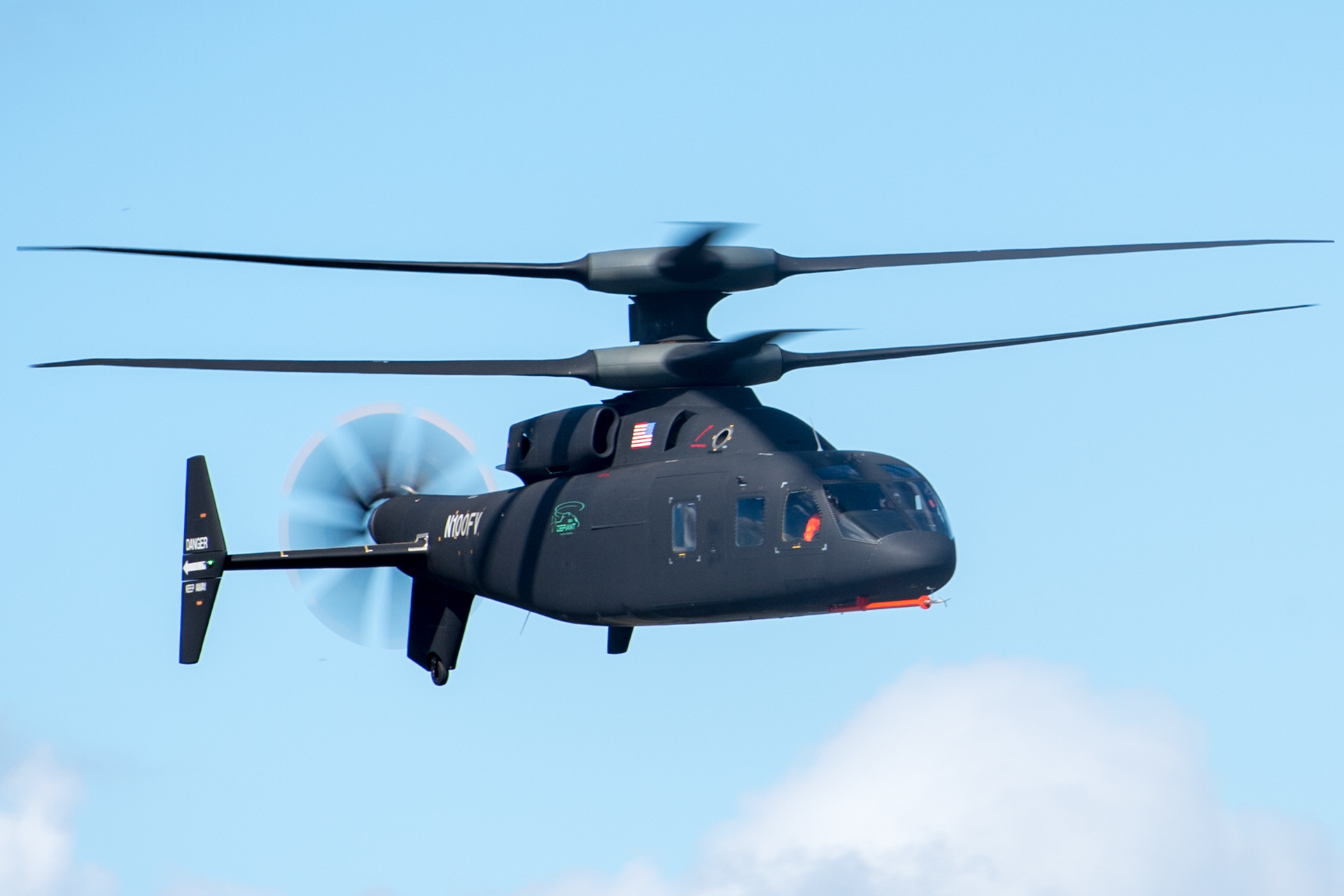
Sikorsky–Boeing SB-1 Defiant in February 2020

FLRAA is part of the Future Vertical Lift (FVL) program; in 2016, Major General William Gayler declared the first FVL aircraft would fill the medium-lift role. The proposed FLRAA program schedule overlaps with the FARA procurement, which is also part of FVL. FARA would provide a light-lift helicopter for the armed reconnaissance/scout role that was previously filled by the Bell OH-58 Kiowa until its retirement in 2014.

On April 4, 2019, the Army released a formal request for information and outlined its proposed schedule for FLRAA:

- Q4FY21 (Jul–Sep 2021): Award contract
- Q2FY23 (Jan–Mar 2023): Preliminary design review
- Q3FY24 (Apr–Jun 2024): First flight
- Q4FY24 (Jul–Sep 2024): Critical design review
- Q2FY30 (Jan–Mar 2030): First unit enters service

The FVL program is headed by Brigadier General Wally Rugen; according to Rugen, based on the data gathered during JMR-TD with the Bell V-280 Valor and the Sikorsky–Boeing SB-1 Defiant, the Army was ready to move on to open competition for the FLRAA contract. In March 2020, the Army awarded competitive demonstration contracts to Bell and Sikorsky/Boeing, who would proceed to complete conceptual designs and explain how the FLRAA requirements were met by the Valor and Defiant candidate designs, respectively.

On 8 February 2024 the US Army ended development of FARA, while FLRAA development is continuing. FLRAA passed Milestone B in the acquisition process in August 2024.
