= Phoenix Skyblazer =

American helicopter

Skyblazer

General information
- Type: Helicopter
- National origin: United States
- Manufacturer: Phoenix Rotorcraft
- Designer: Nolan brothers
- Status: Production completed (2013)
- Number built: At least one

History
- Developed from: Eagle's Perch

The Phoenix Skyblazer is an American helicopter that was designed by the Nolan brothers and produced by Phoenix Rotorcraft of Fallston, Maryland and more recently Louisburg, North Carolina. When it was available the aircraft was supplied as a complete ready-to-fly-aircraft.

While advertised for sale in 2011, by February 2013 the aircraft was no longer listed as being available on the manufacturer's website. By January 2015 the company was offering a new gyroplane using the same name, spelled SkyBlazer, as the previous helicopter design. The company website domain subsequently expired and the company is likely no longer in business.

== Design and development ==
The Skyblazer features two coaxial, contra-rotating main rotors, a single-seat open cockpit without a windshield, skid-type landing gear and two twin-cylinder, air-cooled, two-stroke, dual-ignition 50 hp (37 kW) Rotax 503 engines for redundancy. The two engines were provided due to the aircraft lacking collective pitch control, thus precluding an autorotation in the event of a power loss. The aircraft can reportedly hover on one engine.

The aircraft fuselage is made from welded steel tubing. Its dual two-bladed rotors have diameters of 14.5 ft (4.4 m) and incorporate dual flapping hinges. Directional control is achieved by tilting the rotor mast. The aircraft has an empty weight of 500 lb (227 kg) and a gross weight of 850 lb (386 kg), giving a useful load of 350 lb (159 kg). With full fuel of 26 U.S. gallons (98 L; 22 imp gal) the payload is 194 lb (88 kg).

== Operational history ==
In October 2022 there was one example registered in the United States with the Federal Aviation Administration.

== Specifications (Skyblazer) ==
Data from Bayerl

General characteristics

- Crew: one
- Empty weight: 500 lb (227 kg)
- Gross weight: 850 lb (386 kg)
- Fuel capacity: Two 13 U.S. gallons (49 L; 11 imp gal) tanks
- Powerplant: 2 × Rotax 503 twin cylinder, air-cooled, two stroke aircraft engine, 50 hp (37 kW) each
- Main rotor diameter: 2 × 14.5 ft (4.4 m)

Performance

- Maximum speed: 95 mph (153 km/h, 83 kn)
- Cruise speed: 70 mph (113 km/h, 61 kn)
- Rate of climb: 890 ft/min (4.5 m/s)
