= Bell 360 Invictus =

Proposed American military helicopter

General information
- Type: Reconnaissance and attack helicopter
- National origin: United States
- Manufacturer: Bell Textron
- Status: Canceled

The Bell 360 Invictus was a proposed helicopter design intended to meet the United States Army requirement for a Future Attack Reconnaissance Aircraft (FARA). It is based on technology from the Bell 525 Relentless.

== Design and development ==
Scott C. Donnelly, CEO of Textron, has said in April 2019 that the Bell 360 will be based on the Bell 525. The 360 and 525 will share an articulated rotor system, although the 360, which will only seat two (a pilot and gunner), will use a single engine and a four-blade rotor, whereas the 525 uses twin engines and a five-blade rotor and has a nineteen-passenger capacity. Bell has since announced it is developing the 360 with Collins Aerospace, and the Sierra Nevada Corporation is developing the mission systems for the aircraft.

The design was unveiled on 1 October 2019, showing a two-seat tandem cockpit, with sighting optics and/or laser designator above a 20mm cannon gun turret at the chin position below the cockpit, mid-mounted stub wings below the shrouded rotor hub and four 40 foot (12 m) diameter rotor blades, an active horizontal stabilizer and a tilted and shrouded tail rotor. Missiles are mounted on integrated launchers. The rotor diameter is dictated by US Army requirements, which specified that maximum diameter for FARA candidates to allow the rotorcraft to fit between buildings on future battlefields. Its main engine will be a single General Electric T901 turboshaft engine, with supplemental power from a Pratt & Whitney PW207D1 turboshaft.

The US Army requirement calls for a cruising speed in excess of 180 knots (210 mph; 330 km/h), and the 360 is intended to meet this; the Bell 525 rotor system has been tested to exceed 200 knots (230 mph; 370 km/h). The stub wings are intended to provide lift equivalent to approximately 50% of the weight of the aircraft at moderate to high speed. Combat radius will be 135 nautical miles (155 mi; 250 km) with at least 90 minutes time on station. It will use fly-by-wire control.

Bell unveiled a full-scale mockup of the 360 at the Association of the United States Army annual show beginning 14 October 2019.

On 8 February 2024, the US Army ended development on Future Attack Reconnaissance Aircraft (FARA) program, with Army Chief of Staff Randy George saying the decision was influenced by the use of inexpensive unmanned systems in the Russo-Ukrainian War, putting the service's long-term aviation plans in doubt.

== Specifications (Bell 360) ==
- Image of Bell 360 Invictus in flight

Data from FlightGlobal

General characteristics

- Crew: two
- Powerplant: 1 × General Electric T901 turboshaft (main powerplant)
- Powerplant: 1 × Pratt & Whitney PW207D1 turboshaft, 586 shp (439 kW) (supplemental power unit)

Performance

- Cruise speed: 210 mph (330 km/h, 180 kn)

Armament

- Guns: 1 × 20 mm (0.787 in) unspecified rotary cannon

== See also ==
Related development

- Bell 525 Relentless

Aircraft of comparable role, configuration, and era

- Boeing–Sikorsky RAH-66 Comanche
- Harbin Z-19
- Kawasaki OH-1
- Leonardo Helicopters AW249
- Sikorsky Raider X
