= Coaxial-rotor aircraft =

Helicopter with two sets of rotor blades placed on top of each other

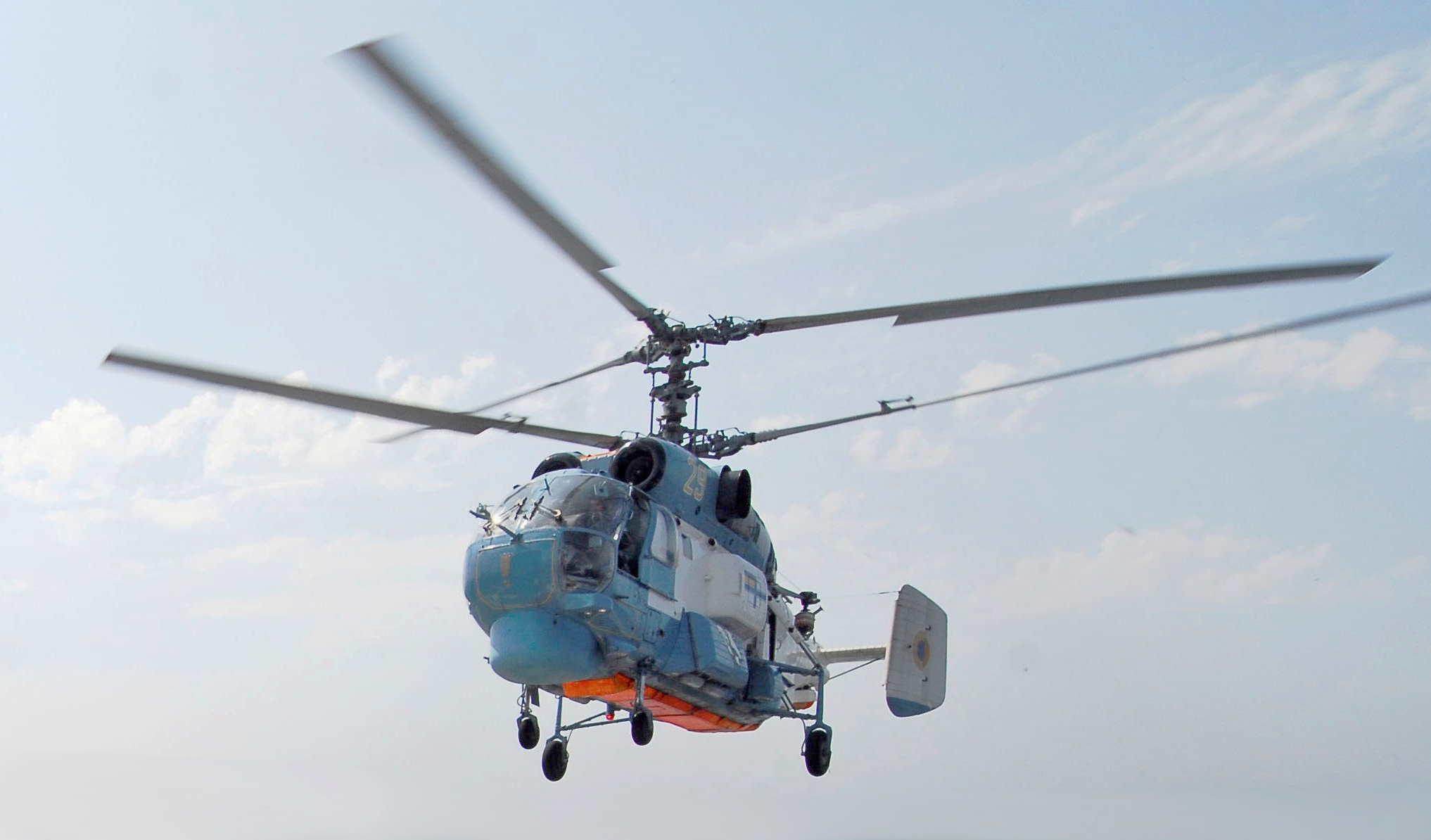
A Ukrainian Navy Kamov Ka-27

A coaxial-rotor aircraft is an aircraft whose rotors are mounted on concentric shafts with the same axis of rotation but turn in opposite directions (contra-rotating). This is done to offset the yawing movement that one rotor imparts on the aircraft. Benefits of this system also include avoiding the dissymmetry of lift problem, reduced noise, and a reduced size of aircraft due to not needing a tail rotor. These advantages come at the cost of increased mechanical complexity for the rotor assembly.

This rotor configuration is a feature of helicopters produced by the Russian Kamov helicopter design bureau.

== History ==
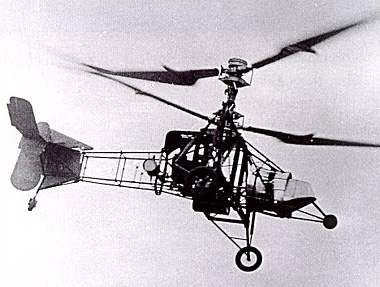
Gyroplane-Laboratoire

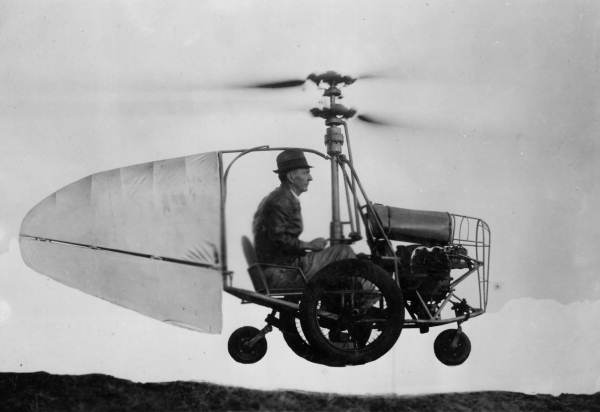
Dixon helicopter

The idea of coaxial rotors originated with Mikhail Lomonosov. He had developed a small helicopter model with coaxial rotors in July 1754 and demonstrated it to the Russian Academy of Sciences. In 1859, the British Patent Office awarded the first helicopter patent to Henry Bright for his coaxial design. Two early helicopters, the "D'AT3" built by Corradino D'Ascanio in 1930, and the generally more successful French mid-1930s Gyroplane Laboratoire, both used coaxial rotor systems for flight.

== Design considerations ==
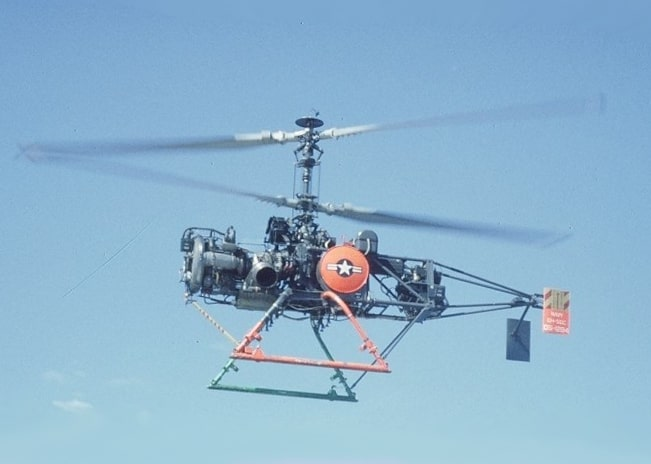
A QH-50 conducts flight tests off the USS Nicholas

Having two coaxial sets of rotors provides symmetry of forces around the central axis for lifting the vehicle and laterally when flying in any direction. Because of the mechanical complexity, many helicopter designs use alternative configurations to avoid problems that arise when only one main rotor is used. Common alternatives are single-rotor helicopters or tandem rotor arrangements.

=== Torque ===
One of the problems with any single set of rotor blades is the torque (rotational force) exerted on the helicopter fuselage in the direction opposite to the rotor blades. This torque causes the fuselage to rotate in the direction opposite to the rotor blades. In single rotor helicopters, the antitorque rotor or tail rotor counteracts the main rotor torque and controls the fuselage rotation.

Coaxial rotors solve the problem of main rotor torque by turning each set of rotors in opposite directions. The opposite torques from the rotors cancel each other out. Rotational maneuvering, yaw control, is accomplished by increasing the collective pitch of one rotor and decreasing the collective pitch on the other. This causes a controlled dissymmetry of torque.

=== Dissymmetry of lift ===
A Ka-32 coaxial rotor animation. Its rotors permit the blades to flap, so this aircraft is not able to compensate for dissymmetry of lift.

Dissymmetry of lift is an aerodynamic phenomenon caused by the rotation of a helicopter's rotors in forward flight. Rotor blades provide lift proportional to the square of the speed of the airflow over them. When viewed from above, the rotor blades move in the direction of flight for half of the rotation (advancing half), and then move in the opposite direction for the remainder of the rotation (retreating half). A rotor blade produces more lift in the advancing half. As a blade moves toward the direction of flight, the forward motion of the aircraft increases the speed of the air flowing around the blade until it reaches a maximum when the blade is perpendicular to the relative wind. At the same time, a rotor blade in the retreating half produces less lift. As a blade moves away from the direction of flight, the speed of the airflow over the rotor blade is reduced by an amount equal to the forward speed of the aircraft, reaching its maximum effect when the rotor blade is again perpendicular to the relative wind.

Coaxial rotors featuring blades with flapwise stiffness compensate for the effects of dissymmetry of lift, as the two rotors turn in opposite directions, allowing the advancing blade(s) of one rotor to provide lift that compensates for the stalled retreating blade(s) of the other. Typical helicopter main rotors do not use blades with flapwise stiffness, however. They permit the blades to flap so that the tip-path plane of the main rotor is able to tilt. This applies to all helicopter rotor configurations, including those with coaxial main rotors. Some compound helicopters do use blades with flapwise stiffness, such as the Sikorsky S-97 Raider, and are able to use their two coaxial rotors to compensate for retreating blade stall.

=== Other benefits ===
Another benefit arising from a coaxial design includes increased payload for the same engine power; a tail rotor typically wastes some of the available engine power that would be fully devoted to lift and thrust with a coaxial design. Reduced noise is another advantage of the configuration; some of the loud "spanking" sound associated with conventional helicopters arises from interaction between the airflows from the main and tail rotors, which in some designs can be severe. Also, helicopters using coaxial rotors tend to have a smaller footprint on the ground at the price of increased height, and consequently have uses in areas where space is at a premium; several Kamov designs are used in naval roles, being capable of operating from confined spaces on the decks of ships, including ships other than aircraft carriers (Kara-class cruisers of the Russian navy carry a Ka-25 'Hormone' helicopter as part of their standard equipment). Another benefit is increased safety on the ground; the absence of a tail rotor eliminates a major source of injuries and fatalities to ground crews and bystanders.

=== Disadvantages ===
There is an increased mechanical complexity of the rotor hub. The linkages and swashplates for two rotor systems need to be assembled atop the mast, which is more complex because of the need to drive two rotors in opposite directions. Because of the greater number of moving parts and complexity, the coaxial rotor system is more prone to mechanical faults and possible failure. Coaxial helicopters are also more prone to the "whipping" of blades and blade self-collision.

== Coaxial models ==
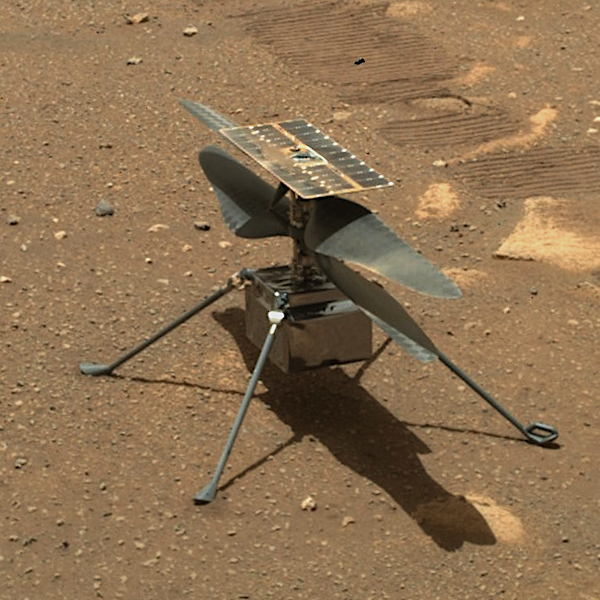
NASA Mars Helicopter Ingenuity

The system's inherent stability and quick control response make it suitable for use in small radio-controlled helicopters. These benefits come at the cost of a limited forward speed, and higher sensitivity to wind. These two factors are especially limiting in outdoor use. Such models are usually fixed-pitch (i.e., the blades cannot be rotated on their axes for different angles of attack), simplifying the model but eliminating the ability to compensate with collective input. Compensating for even the slightest breeze causes the model to climb rather than to fly forward even with full application of cyclic.

== Coaxial multirotors ==
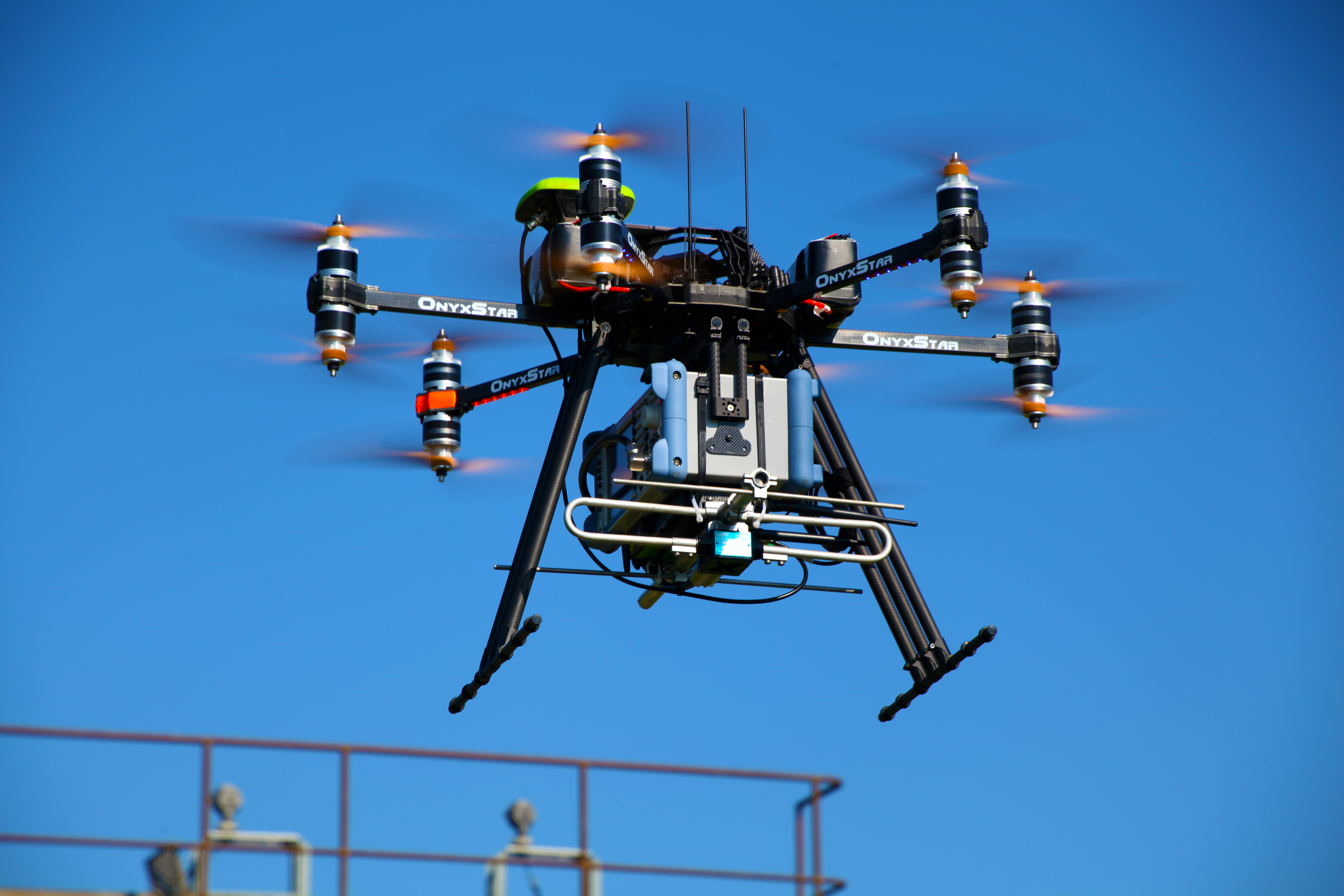
Coaxial hexacopter – OnyxStar HYDRA-12 from AltiGator

Multirotor type unmanned aerial vehicles exist in numerous configurations including duocopter, tricopter, quadcopter, hexacopter and octocopter. All of them can be upgraded to coaxial configuration in order to bring more stability and flight time while allowing carrying much more payload without gaining too much weight. Indeed, coaxial multirotors are made by having each arm carrying two motors facing in opposite directions (one up and one down). Therefore, it is possible to have a quad-axis, octorotor airframe thanks to coaxial configuration. Duocopters are characterised by two motors aligned in a vertical axis. The control is performed by the appropriate acceleration of a single rotor blade for targeted thrust generation during revolution. Having more lifting power for a greater payload explains why coaxial multirotors are preferred for nearly all large-payload commercial applications of UAS.

== Reduced hazards of flight ==
The U.S. Department of Transportation has published a “Basic Helicopter Handbook”. One of the chapters in it is titled, "Some Hazards of Helicopter Flight". Ten hazards are listed to indicate what a typical single rotor helicopter has to deal with. The coaxial rotor design either reduces or completely eliminates many of these hazards. The following list indicates which:

- Settling with power — Reduced
- Retreating blade stall — Reduced
- Medium frequency vibrations — Reduced
- High frequency vibrations — None
- Anti torque system failure in forward flight — Eliminated
- Anti torque system failure while hovering — Eliminated

The reduction and elimination of these hazards are the strong points for the safety of coaxial rotor design.

== List of coaxial rotor helicopters ==
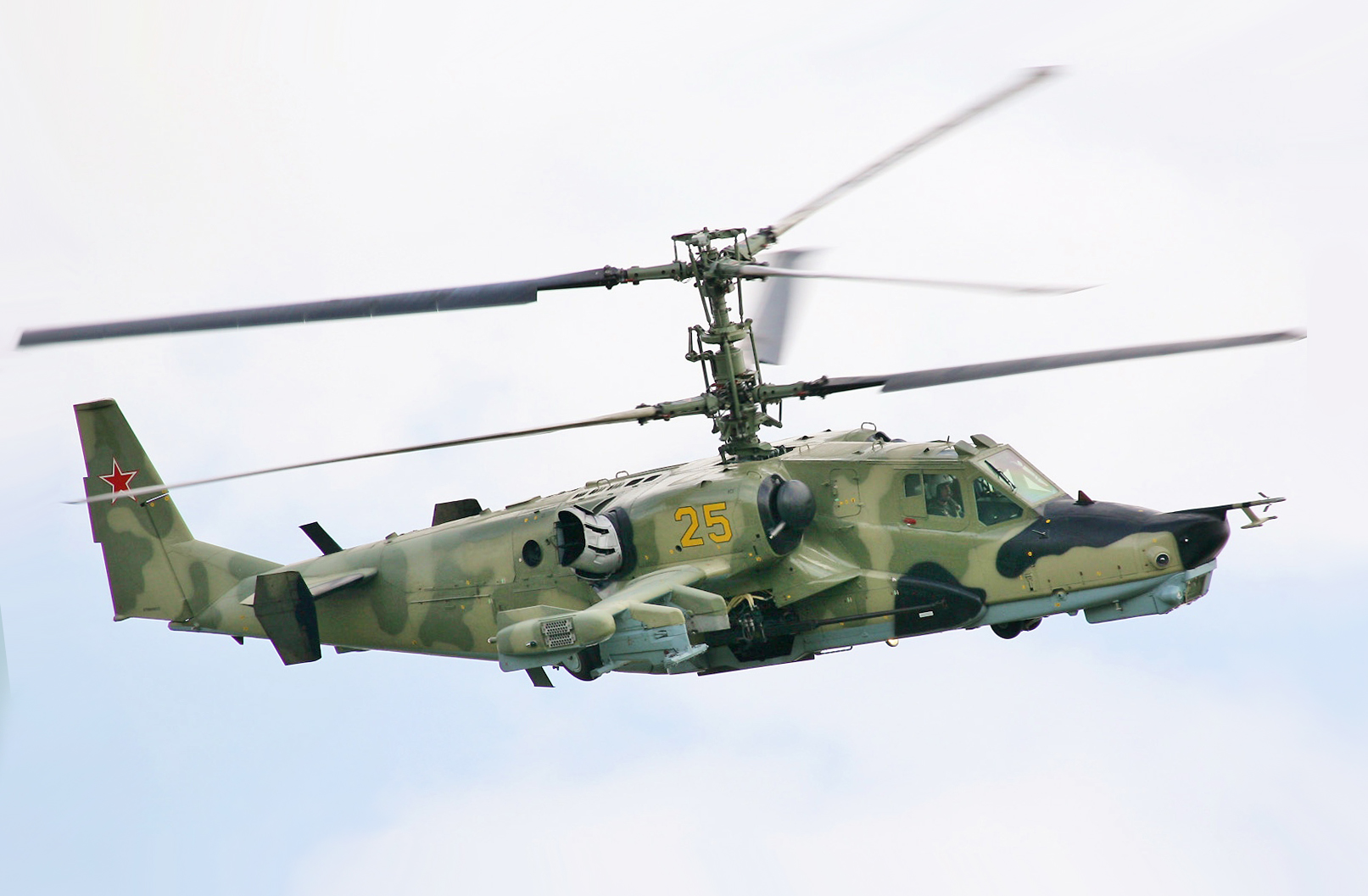
Russian Air Force Kamov Ka-50

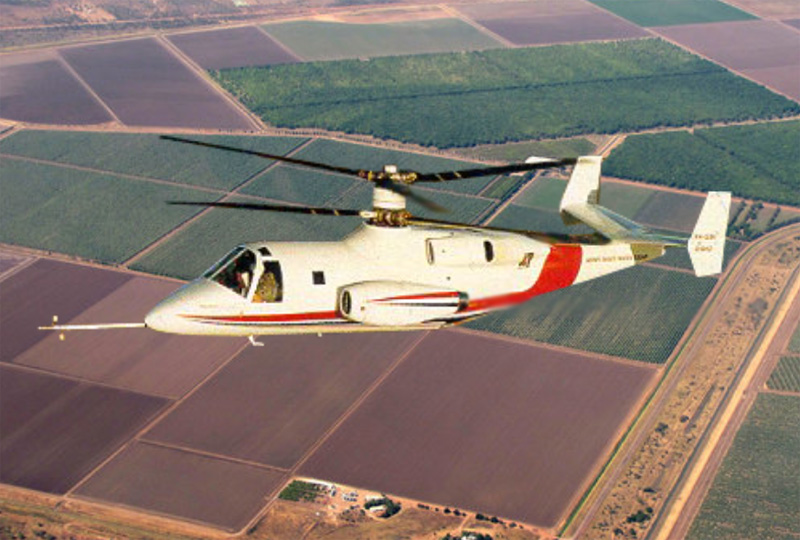
Sikorsky S-69/XH-59A with auxiliary turbojets

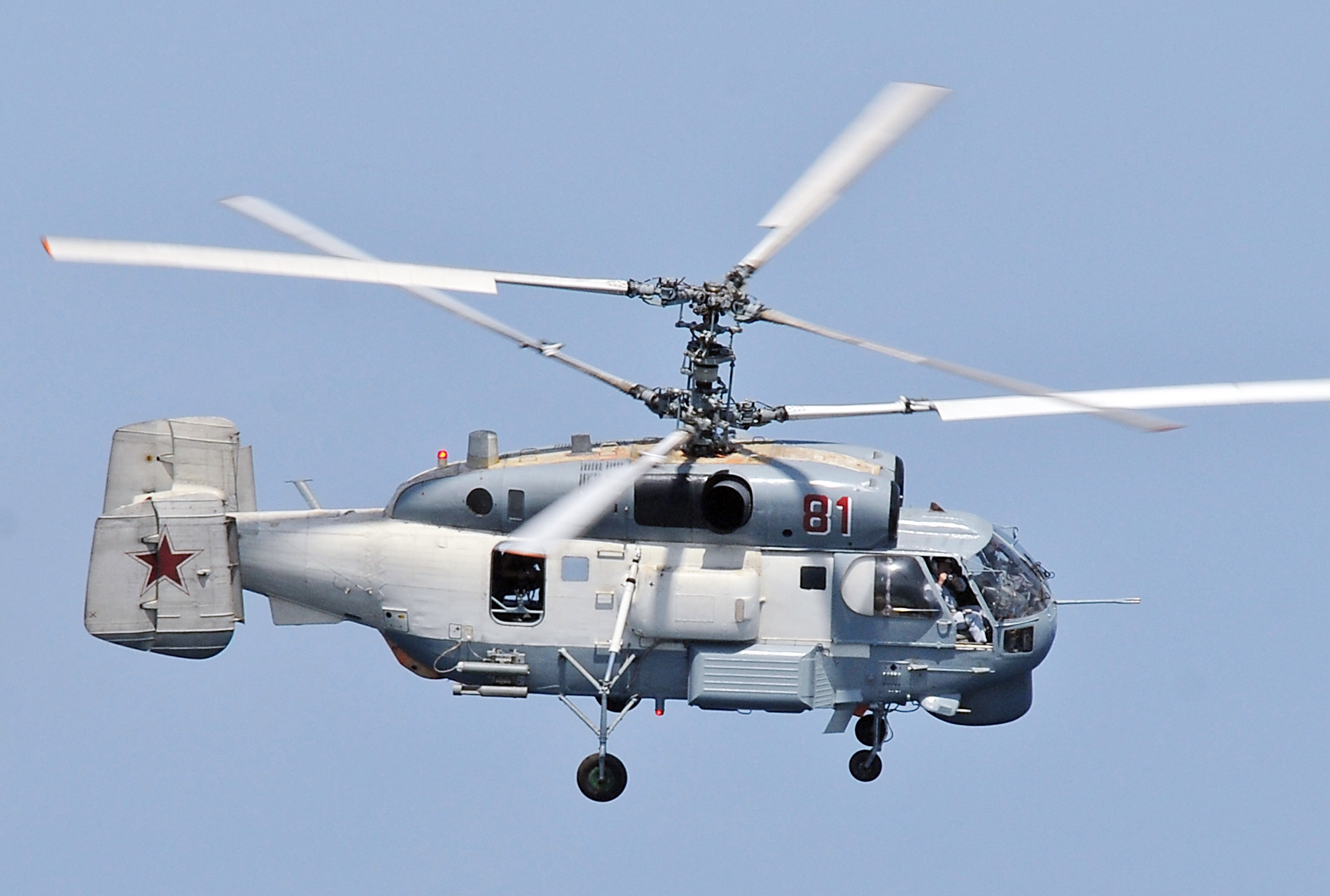
Russian Navy Kamov Ka-27

- Bendix Model K (1945)
- Brantly B-1 (1946)
- Bendix Model J (1946)
- Bréguet G.111 (1949)
- Bréguet-Dorand Gyroplane Laboratoire (1936)
- Cierva CR Twin (1969)
- Cranfield Vertigo (1987)
- Eagle's Perch (1998)
- EDM Aerotec CoAX 2D/2R
- Gyrodyne QH-50 DASH
- Hiller XH-44 (1944)
- Kamov Ka-8 (1947)
- Kamov Ka-10 (1949)
- Kamov Ka-15 (1953)
- Kamov Ka-18 (1955)
- Kamov Ka-25 (1963)
- Kamov Ka-26 (1965)
- Kamov Ka-27 (1974)
- Kamov Ka-50 (1982 and 1997 for Ka-52)
- Kamov Ka-92
- Kamov Ka-126 (1988)
- Kamov Ka-226 (1997)
- Manzolini Libellula (1952)
- Phoenix Skyblazer (2011)
- Sikorsky S-69 (1973)
- Sikorsky X2 (2008)
- Sikorsky S-97
- Sikorsky/Boeing SB-1 Defiant
- Wagner Aerocar
- Mars helicopter Ingenuity (2021)

== See also ==
- Intermeshing rotors
- Contra-rotating propellers
- Tandem rotors
- Transverse rotors
- Mars helicopter Ingenuity
