= Sikorsky X2 =

Experimental high-speed compound helicopter

X2
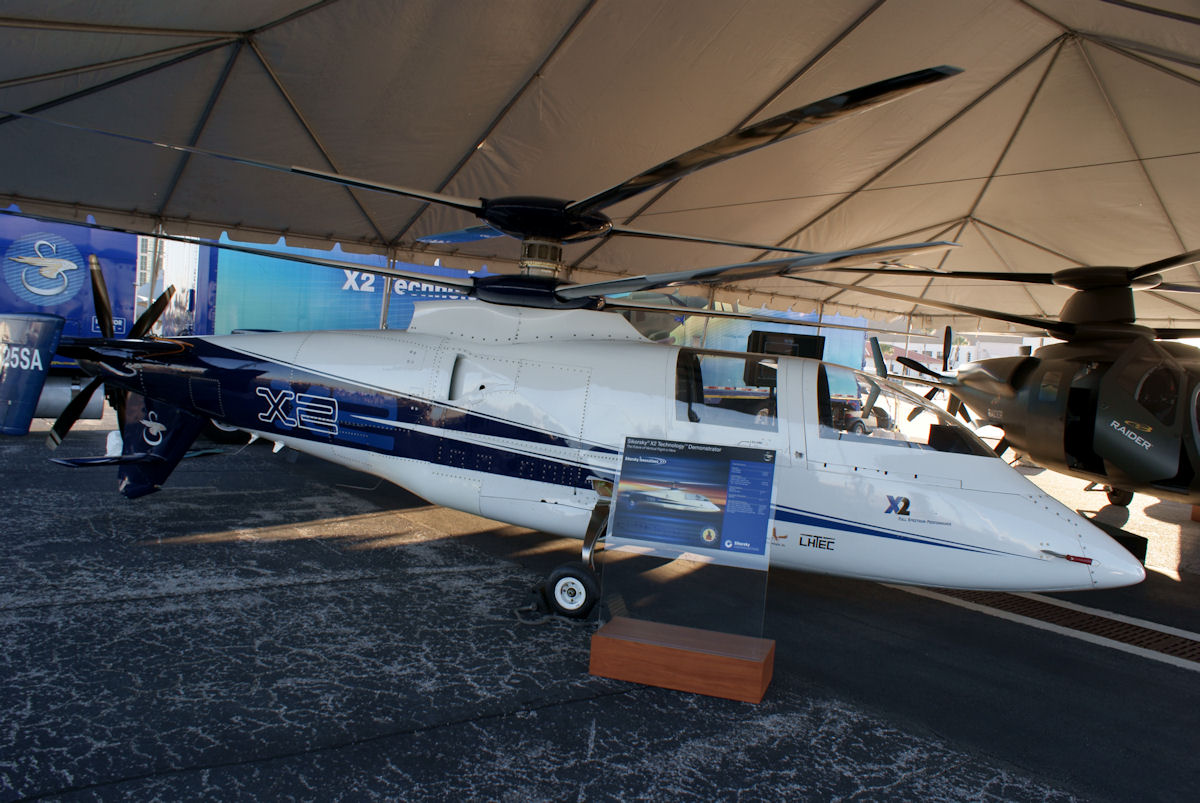
- Sikorsky X2 Demonstrator

General information
- Type: Experimental compound helicopter
- Manufacturer: Sikorsky Aircraft / Schweizer Aircraft
- Status: Retired
- Number built: 1

History
- First flight: 27 August 2008
- Retired: 14 July 2011

The Sikorsky X2 is an experimental high-speed compound helicopter with coaxial rotors, developed by Sikorsky Aircraft, that made its first flight in 2008 and was officially retired in 2011.

== Design and development ==
Sikorsky developed the X2 helicopter on a $50 million budget. The design includes expertise gathered from several earlier design projects. The S-69/XH-59A Advancing Blade Concept Demonstrator had shown that high speed was possible with a coaxial helicopter with auxiliary propulsion supplied using two jet engines, but that vibration and fuel consumption was excessive; the Cypher UAV expanded the company's knowledge of the unique aspects of coaxial flight control laws with a fly-by-wire aircraft; and the RAH-66 Comanche developed expertise in composite rotors and advanced transmission design.

Other features include slowed "de-swirling" rigid rotors two feet apart, active force counter-vibration inspired by the Black Hawk, and using most of the power in forward flight for the pusher propeller rather than the rotor. Unusually for helicopters, the power required for high speed is more than the hover power. The pilot controls the independent propeller power with a thumb wheel on the collective.

Test flights and flight simulations were combined to improve test procedure. The fly-by-wire system is provided by Honeywell, the rotor by Eagle Aviation Technologies, anti-vibration technology from Moog Inc, and propeller by Aero Composites. The rotor hub can have 10-20 times the drag of the blade. Sikorsky intended to test hub fairings to reduce drag by 40%, and test flew fairings on the hubs themselves but not the central hub fairing ("aero sail") in between the hubs. Sikorsky has since patented a "Standpipe" (fixed tube between rotating rotor axes) suitable for a central hub fairing.

On 4 May 2009, Sikorsky unveiled a mockup of a Light Tactical Helicopter derivative of the X2, and unveiled a prototype in October 2014.

In June 2014, Sikorsky/Boeing submitted the SB-1 Defiant helicopter design for the Future Vertical Lift program based on the X2 principle, which was approved by the Army in October.

== Operational history ==
The X2 first flew on 27 August 2008 from Schweizer Aircraft, a division of Sikorsky Aircraft Corporation's facility at Horseheads, New York. The flight lasted 30 minutes. This began a four-phase flight test program, to culminate with reaching a planned 250-knot top speed. The X2 completed flights with its propeller fully engaged in July 2009. Sikorsky completed phase three of the testing with the X2 reaching 181 knots in test flight in late May 2010.

On 26 July 2010, Sikorsky announced that the X2 exceeded 225 knots (259 mph; 417 km/h) during flight testing in West Palm Beach Florida, unofficially surpassing the current FAI rotorcraft world speed record of 216 knots (249 mph; 400 km/h) set by a modified Westland Lynx in 1986.

On 15 September 2010, test pilot Kevin Bredenbeck achieved Sikorsky's design goal for the X2 when he flew it at a speed of 250 knots (290 mph; 460 km/h) in level flight, an unofficial speed record for a helicopter. The demonstrator then reached a new record speed of 260 knots (300 mph; 480 km/h) in a shallow 2˚ to 3˚ dive, which was just short of the 303 mph achieved by the Sikorsky S-69 technology demonstrator helicopter. Sikorsky states that the X2 has the same noise level at 200 knots that a regular helicopter has at 100 knots. Above 200 knots, the rotor speed is reduced from 446 to 360 RPM to keep tip speed below Mach 0.9, the rotor disc is slightly nose-up, and the lift-to-drag ratio is about twice that of a conventional helicopter. Hands-off flying was also successfully performed during flight tests.

On 14 July 2011, the X2 completed its final flight and was officially retired after accumulating 22 hours over 23 test flights. With the end of development, the X2 will be followed by its first application, the S-97 Raider high-speed scout and attack helicopter. It was donated to the National Air and Space Museum in October 2016 and is on display in the Steven F. Udvar-Hazy Center in Chantilly, Virginia.

=== Awards ===
The Sikorsky Aircraft Corporation and the X2 Technology Demonstrator Team was awarded the 2010 Robert J. Collier Trophy by the National Aeronautic Association "...For demonstrating a revolutionary 250 knot helicopter, which marks a proven departure point for the future development of helicopters by greatly increasing their speed, maneuverability and utility." For 2011, the X2 team received the Howard Hughes Award (American Helicopter Society).

== Specifications ==
Data from Flug-Revue NOTE: No other specifications have been released by Sikorsky.

General characteristics

- Crew: Two
- Aspect ratio: 9.5
- Empty weight: 5,300 lb (2,404 kg)
- Gross weight: 6,000 lb (2,722 kg)
- Max takeoff weight: 5,300 lb (2,404 kg) –6,000 lb (2,700 kg)
- Powerplant: 1 × LHTEC T800-LHT-801 turboshaft, 1,800 shp (1,300 kW)
- Main rotor diameter: 2 × 26 ft 5 in (8.05 m)
- Main rotor area: 548 sq ft (50.9 m^{2}) contra-rotating four-bladed coaxial.
- Propellers: 6-bladed pusher

Performance

- Maximum speed: 290 mph (460 km/h, 250 kn)
- Range: 35 mi (56 km, 30 nmi)
- Wing loading: 0.44 lb/sq ft (2.1 kg/m^{2})
- Power/mass: 3.66 hp/lb

== See also ==
Related development

- Sikorsky S-69
- Sikorsky S-97 Raider
- Sikorsky–Boeing SB-1 Defiant
- Sikorsky Raider X

Aircraft of comparable role, configuration, and era

- Eurocopter X³
- Kamov Ka-92
- Mil Mi-X1
- Piasecki X-49

Related lists

- List of rotorcraft
