= T800 =

T800 may refer to:

- Avco/Pratt & Whitney T800, a turboshaft engine which lost to the LHTEC T800
- INMOS T800, a 1980s transputer chip
- LHTEC T800, a turboshaft engine for rotary wing applications
- T-800, a fictional android frequently described as a cyborg, from the Terminator series
- Kenworth T800, a Class 8 truck used as a semi-tractor and as a vocational truck.
