= Advanced Turbine Engine Company =

American aerospace joint venture

Advanced Turbine Engine Company (ATEC)
- Type: Joint venture
- Industry: Aerospace
- Founded: 2006
- Headquarters: United States
- Key people: Christopher Cochran, president; Vacant, vice president, programs
- Products: ATEC T900 turbine engine
- Parent: Honeywell and United Technologies Corporation's Pratt & Whitney
- Website: www.dualspoolrules.com

The Advanced Turbine Engine Company (ATEC) is an American aerospace joint venture created in 2006. A project of Honeywell International Inc. and Pratt & Whitney, ATEC was formed to compete for a government contract to create a 3,000 shaft horsepower engine to replace the existing 2,000 shaft horsepower T700 engine powering the U.S. Army's Sikorsky UH-60 Black Hawk and Boeing AH-64 Apache helicopters.

ATEC participated in the Army's Advanced Affordable Turbine Engine science and technology program and completed multiple tests of its ATEC T900 engine. It is furthering the engine's development through the Army's competitive Improved Turbine Engine Program, which calls for a new helicopter engine with 50 percent more power and 25 percent better fuel efficiency. The company opened its Huntsville, Alabama, office in November 2014.

== History ==
Honeywell International Inc. and United Technologies Corporation subsidiary Pratt & Whitney created the Advanced Turbine Engine Company in 2006. The company is led by Craig Madden, president, and Jerry Wheeler, vice president, programs. At the 2007 Paris Air Show, the fifty-fifty joint venture said it would participate in the U.S. Army's Advanced Affordable Turbine Engine (AATE) program. In May 2008, the Army awarded a $108 million contract to ATEC for the science and technology initiative to replace the current T700 engine. Through the project, the Army seeks to increase the power and efficiency of engines for Sikorsky UH-60 Black Hawk and Boeing AH-64 Apache helicopters, to keep the helicopters in the fleet for an additional 30 years or more. ATEC is competing against GE Aviation to develop the new engine.

Parent company facilities in Connecticut and Arizona hosted the early development of ATEC's HPW3000 engine. ATEC conducted tests of the HPW3000 in 2013 and 2014, including a sand ingestion demonstration. As of May 2015, ATEC is preparing to move into the Army's next phase of helicopter engine development, the Improved Turbine Engine Program (ITEP), following the AATE program. Maj. Gen. Michael Lundy, who commanded the Army Aviation Center of Excellence, and Heidi Shyu, the Army's assistant secretary for acquisition, called ITEP the Army's top aviation modernization priority. The National Defense Authorization Act funded ITEP at $126 million for Fiscal Year 2017.

In November 2014, ATEC moved to the Cummings Research Park in Huntsville, Alabama. The Huntsville Times reported that city officials lobbied for three years to get ATEC to locate there. Originally, Wheeler said four or five management and business development workers would work out of the new office, in addition to visiting engineers and logistics professionals.

== Products ==
- ATEC T900
