= General Electric T901 =

Turboshaft engine for the US Army

T901
- Type: Turboshaft
- National origin: United States
- Manufacturer: GE Aerospace
- First run: 22 March 2022
- Developed from: General Electric T700

The General Electric T901 (GE3000) is a turboshaft engine in the 3,000 shp (2,200 kW) class currently under development for the United States Army's Improved Turbine Engine Program (ITEP). The ITEP plans after 2025 to re-engine over 1,300 Sikorsky UH-60 Black Hawk and more than 600 Boeing AH-64 Apache, and was intended to power the now-canceled Future Attack Reconnaissance Aircraft (FARA).

== Development ==
Since 2010, General Electric has spent more than $300 million to develop and test T901-specific technologies. In 2016, the Army awarded GE Aviation a $102-million, 24-month contract for the T901 preliminary design review for which a team of more than 100 engineers was assembled. The GE-funded prototype six month testing was completed in October 2017, meeting or exceeding the ITEP performance and growth requirements.

On 1 February 2019, the US Army selected the GE T901 as the winner of the ITEP program. Engineering completion and manufacturing development are contracted for $517 million, for August 2024 before low-rate production.

On 22 March 2022, the first turboshaft began bench tests at GE's Lynn, Massachusetts facility. It finished on 28 June 2022 after over 100 hours of testing. The first engine was scheduled to be delivered to the US Army in the fall of 2023. Another engine production delay caused the initial flight of a FARA prototype to be rescheduled for early 2024.

== Design ==
GE has maintained the T700 single spool architecture for modularity and reliability with additive manufacturing and ceramic matrix composites (CMCs) from the CFM LEAP, GE9X or GE ATP. Additive manufactured components lower weight by minimizing attaching features in assemblies and allows more advanced aerodynamic shapes for better engine performance, reliability and durability. More durable and higher temperature CMCs replace metal alloys, needing less cooling and improving engine efficiency.

== Applications ==
- Bell 360 Invictus
- Sikorsky Raider X

== Specifications ==
Data from 2019 ARPA-E INTEGRATE annual meeting (estimates)

==== General characteristics ====
- Type: Turboshaft
- Length: 48.2 in (1,220 mm)
- Diameter: 25–26 in (640–660 mm)
- Dry weight:

==== Components ====
- Compressor:

==== Performance ====
- Maximum power output: About 3,000 hp (2,200 kW)
- Specific fuel consumption: Less than 0.4 lb/(hp⋅h) (0.24 kg/kWh)

== See also ==
Related development

- General Electric T700/CT7

Comparable engines

- ATEC T900

Related lists

- List of aircraft engines
