= ShinMaywa =

Japanese conglomerate

ShinMaywa Industries, Ltd.
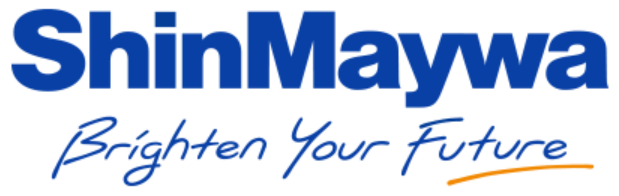
- Native name: Japanese: 新明和工業株式会社
- Romanized name: Shin-Meiwa Kōgyō Kabushiki-gaisha
- Formerly: ShinMeiwa Industries, Ltd.
- Type: K.K.
- Traded as: TYO: 7224
- Industry: Transportation, Machine, Defense
- Predecessor: Kawanishi Aircraft Company
- Founded: November 5, 1949; 76 years ago
- Founder: Seibe Kawanishi
- Headquarters: Takarazuka, Hyōgo Prefecture, Japan
- Area served: worldwide
- Key people: Yoshihiro Onishi (President and CEO)
- Products: Flying boats, Aircraft parts, Special trucks, Industrial Machinery
- Number of employees: 4,695 (March 2016)
- Divisions: Aircraft Division; Special Purpose Truck Division; Parking Systems Division; Industrial Machinery Systems Division; Fluid Division
- Website: www.shinmaywa.co.jp

ShinMaywa Industries, Ltd. (新明和工業株式会社, Shin-Meiwa Kōgyō Kabushiki-gaisha) is a Japanese industrial conglomerate descended from the Kawanishi Aircraft Company. Founded as Shin Meiwa Industries in 1949, the company was rebranded as ShinMaywa during 1992. Prior to this, the company was also known as Shin Meiwa Industry co., Ltd. (SMIC).

ShinMaywa, headquartered in Takarazuka, Hyōgo Prefecture, is perhaps best known for its seaplanes, such as the Shin Meiwa US-1A amphibian, and its upgraded form, the ShinMaywa US-2. The company has also been involved in the international supply chain of aircraft manufacturers such as American Boeing corporation.

== History ==
Following the end of the Second World War and the start of the Occupation of Japan, a ban on aircraft manufacturing imposed during December 1945 required Japan's aircraft industry to find other work. During the late 1940s, Japanese aircraft manufacturer Kawanishi Aircraft Company reorganised itself, becoming Shin Meiwa Industries. During the 1950s, the emergence of the Cold War between the United States and the Soviet Union led to the aircraft construction ban being rescinded; Shin Meiwa, which had turned to heavy machinery and engine manufacturing for the intervening years, decided to resurrect their old aircraft works. Initially, the company focused on smaller efforts, such as subcontracting work, the production of drop tanks, and performing airframe overhauls of both Japanese and American aircraft, such as the US Navy's Martin P5M Marlin flying boats. However, senior figures, such as chief aircraft designer Shizo Kikuhara and founder Ryuzo Kawanishi were keen to pursue projects of a greater scope.

During the early 1950s, Kawanishi had formed a committee headed by Kikuhara which was tasked with developing seaplane designs that would feature greater seaworthiness. Unlike most seaplanes, they held the ambitious aim of producing an aircraft that could land upon rough seas and encounter little impact from waves and spray. By 1959, the committee felt that it had developed an appropriate design to meet its specification. Two years later, Kikuhara, who now headed up the company's Amphibian Development Division, was lobbying the Japanese Defense Agency to consider the adoption of a flying boat to meet the nation's requirement for an anti-submarine warfare (ASW) patrol aircraft. Shin Meiwa stated that they would produce a specialised design to undertake the ASW mission. Crucial support came from the US Navy, who were keen to see Japan's ASW capabilities expand to help track and contain the growing Soviet submarine presence in the Pacific.

To minimize costs and to support the development of the company's ideas, the Americans provided a single Grumman HU-16 Albatross flying boat, which was modified into a flying testbed aircraft, referred to as the UF-XS. The experimental flying boat featured numerous adaptations, including a novel boundary layer control system to provide enhanced Short Takeoff/Landing (STOL) performance, while the Albatross's two 1,425 hp (1,063 kW) Wright R-1820 radial engines were supplemented by two 600 hp (450 kW) Pratt & Whitney R-1340 radial engines on the aircraft's wings, with an additional 1,250 shp (930 kW) General Electric T58 turboshaft inside the aircraft's hull to drive the boundary layer control system. The UF-XS also featured a new T-tail arrangement which resembled that of the P5M2 Marlin.

From 1962 onwards, the UF-XS performed numerous test flights, demonstrating the improved features which enabled a flying boat to both land and take-off from the open ocean; these tests were closely followed and critiqued by the Japanese military. Over time, the UF-XS continued to be modified to improve its stability and other key performance criteria. In 1966, the Japan Maritime Self-Defense Force (JMSDF) awarded Shin Meiwa a contract to further develop its design to produce a patrol aircraft capable of the ASW mission; accordingly, two further prototypes were constructed under the designation PS-X. In addition to Shin Meiwa, other Japanese companies, such as Fuji Heavy Industries and NIPPI Corporation, also played major roles in the PS-X's development. The adaptions resulted in significant seaworthiness improvements; during tests conducted in the Kii Channel during 1968, the PS-X successfully landed amid formidable four-meter waves, despite these being in excess of its design goal of three meters.

Having been suitably impressed, during 1969, the JMSDF issued a production order for a batch of 21 aircraft, which were given the designation PS-1, to meet its ASW requirement. In spite of its demonstrated performance, the project was not without its critics. The capability of contemporary sonar units meant that it was impossible to track submerged vessels while airborne; instead, a submarine hunter would have to land to use a dipping sonar or deploy a sonobuoy. The programme soon became politically controversial as its relatively small production run had resulted in an extremely high unit-cost for these aircraft, largely due to the inherent costs involved in the development of brand new aircraft designs. For its part, Shin Meiwa made efforts to commercialise design elements of the aircraft, such as its hydraulics and engine control systems; it successfully exported its roll dampening technology to multiple aircraft companies.

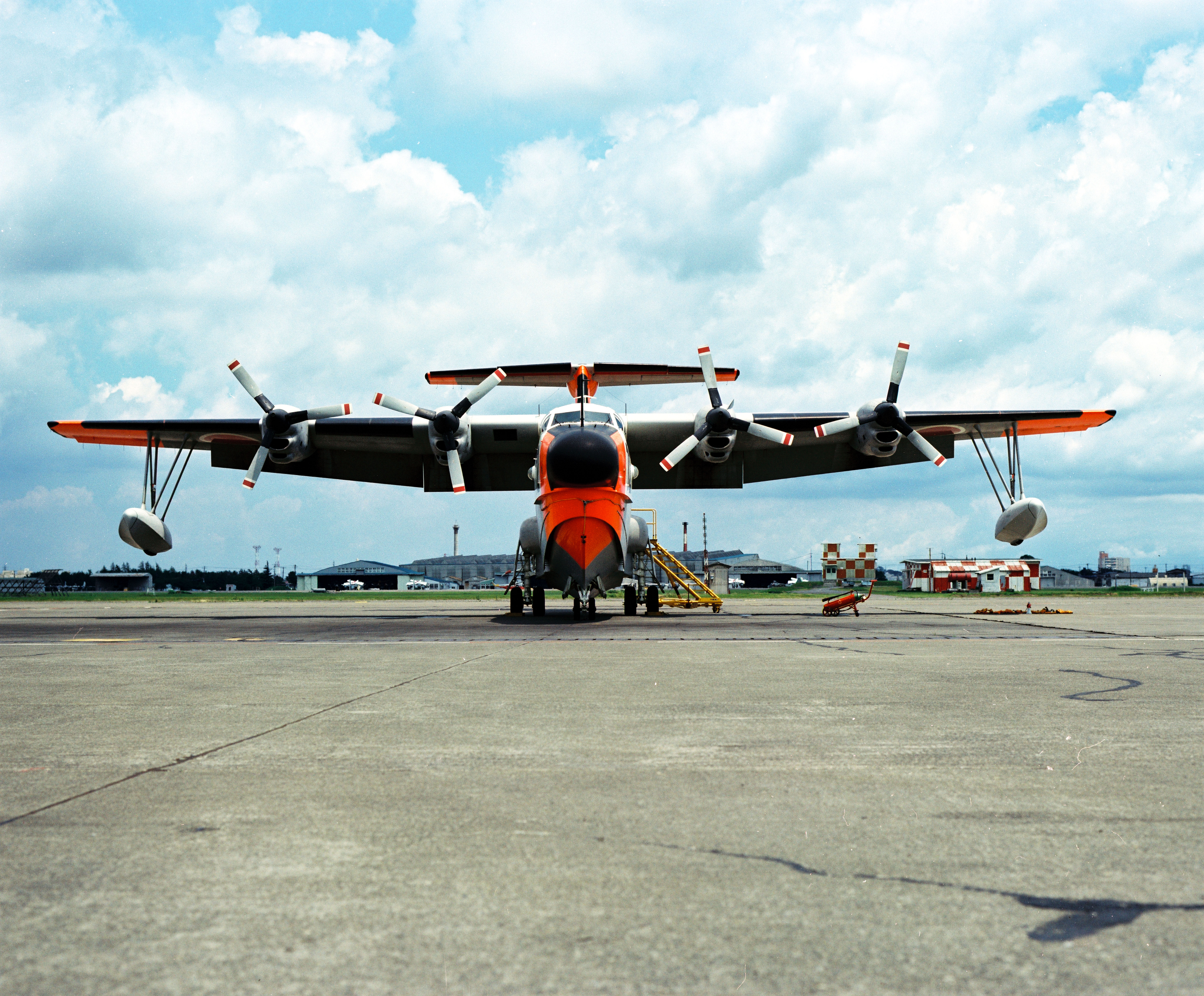
Head-on view of a JMSDF US-1A parked on land

The PS-1 had not been in service long before the JMSDF requested the development of a search-and-rescue (SAR) variant. Shin Meiwa, being keen to pursue the aircraft's development, embarked upon fulfilling this request. By deleting much of the PS-1's military equipment, room was freed up to provide the aircraft with a greater fuel capacity, workable landing gear, and rescue equipment. The new variant, which was designated the US-1A, could also quickly be converted for troop-carrying duties. The US-1A was Japan's first amphibian, being capable of being used upon both the land and sea, which meant that it could transfer survivors to land facilities via ambulance more quickly. First flown on October 15, 1974, it was accepted into service during the following year, and eventually 19 aircraft were purchased. From the seventh aircraft on, an uprated version of the original engine was used, all aircraft were eventually modified to this US-1A standard.

During the 1990s, by which point the US-1A fleet was beginning to show its age, the JMSDF attempted to obtain funding towards acquiring a replacement, but could not secure enough to develop an entirely new aircraft. Therefore, during 1995, ShinMaywa (as Shin Meiwa had been renamed, reportedly so that the name would be easier to pronounce for non-Japanese speakers) set about planning to produce an upgraded version of the US-1A, initially referred to as the US-1A kai (US-1A 改 - "improved US-1A"). This aircraft features numerous aerodynamic refinements and modernised systems, along with a pressurised hull, and the adoption of more powerful Rolls-Royce AE 2100 engines. Flight tests of the new variant began on 18 December 2003. The JMSDF has chosen to purchase up to 14 of these aircraft, which has entered service as the ShinMaywa US-2.

== Products ==
=== Aircraft ===
- Shin Meiwa D.H.114-TAW (licence-built de Havilland Heron)
- Shin Meiwa PS-1 flying boat
- Shin Meiwa US-1A amphibian
- ShinMaywa US-2 amphibian

Modifications (Tokushima Plant)

Examples:

- Gates Learjet U-21 - Originally known as U-36A1. High-speed training support/utility transport aircraft. (JMSDF) (4 modified)
- Gates Learjet U-36 - Combat support/training aircraft. (JASDF) (6 modified)

=== Special-purpose trucks/Equipment ===
- Mining dump trucks
- Tankers
- Concrete Mixers
- ShinMaywa CB 2900 crane in Dnipro, Ukraine.
  "ARM-ROLL" Detachable Container System
- MULTI-LOADER (Skip Trucks)
- Bulk Z (Pneumatic Bulk Transporters)
- Car carriers

=== Components ===
The company is one of five major Japanese companies contracted to build parts for Boeing's 777X aircraft, specifically the fairings that connect the wings to the fuselage. ShinMaywa also produces wing spars for the Boeing 787.

=== Unbuilt concept aircraft ===
In 1977, Shin Meiwa revealed several ideas that it had on the drawing board for STOL flying boats, however, none of these were ever built. They were the Shin Meiwa LA (Light Amphibian), a 40-passenger light amphibian for inter-island feeder service; the 400 passenger Shin Meiwa MA (Medium Amphibian); the Shin Meiwa MS (Medium Seaplane) a 300 passenger long range flying boat with its own beaching gear; and the gargantuan Shin Meiwa GS (Giant Seaplane) that has a passenger capacity of an astonishing twelve-hundred (1200) passengers seated on three decks. Unlike the Shin Meiwa LA and MA which were like the US-1 in design the Shin Meiwa MS and GS had its engines located in front of and above the wing like the USAF Boeing YC-14 to give STOL effect. In the end, none of the four designs got beyond the drawing boards.

Also during the late 1970s, Shin Meiwa were working on a successor for the PS-1 ASW seaplane, however the program, along with further orders for the PS-1, was cancelled in September 1980. This was because land based aircraft (i.e. P-3C) seemed to have alleviated the need for more seaplanes for Anti-Submarine Warfare.

There were at least two unfulfilled spin-offs of the PS-1 at one stage underway. These (landplane) designs were Design #487 and Design #487C, part of a joint program of the 1970s with Grumman. Design #487 was aimed at a US Military STOL transport requirement, while Design #487C was a 90-seat commercial STOL airliner version aimed in particular at American Airlines.
