= ShinMaywa US-2 =

Japanese amphibious aircraft

US-2
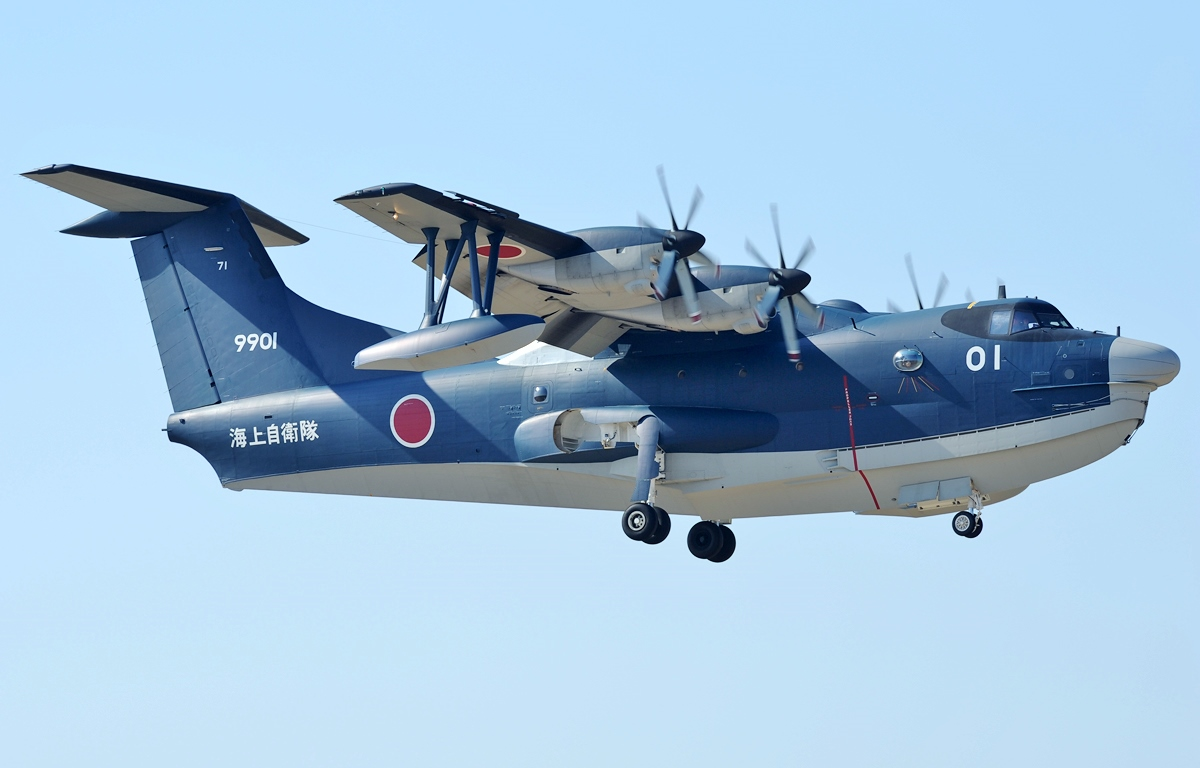
- ShinMaywa US-2

General information
- Type: Air-sea rescue amphibian
- Manufacturer: ShinMaywa
- Status: In production
- Primary user: Japan Maritime Self Defense Force
- Number built: 9

History
- Manufactured: 2003–present
- Introduction date: 30 March 2007
- First flight: 18 December 2003
- Developed from: Shin Meiwa US-1A

The ShinMaywa US-2 is a large Japanese short takeoff and landing turboprop amphibious aircraft that employs boundary layer control technology for enhanced STOL and stall suppression performance. Manufactured by seaplane specialist ShinMaywa (formerly Shin Meiwa), it was developed from the earlier Shin Meiwa US-1A seaplane, which was introduced in the 1970s.

The ShinMaywa US-2 was developed on behalf of the Japan Maritime Self-Defense Force (JMSDF) as a 'like-for-like' replacement for its aging US-1A fleet. In Japanese service, it is operated in the air-sea rescue (ASR) role. The US-2 can also be used in other capacities, such as an aerial fire fighter, carrying 15 tonnes of water for this mission.

Overseas operators have held discussions on potential acquisitions of the type, including the Indian Navy and Indian Coast Guard. Countries such as the United States, Indonesia, Thailand, and Greece have also shown interest in the US-2 for various purposes.

== Design and development ==
In 1969, the Japan Maritime Self-Defense Force (JMSDF) issued a production order to Japanese seaplane manufacturer Shin Meiwa for a group of 21 anti-submarine aircraft, which were given the designation PS-1. The service also procured a variant of the type, designated US-1A, specifically for search-and-rescue (SAR).

During the 1990s when the US-1A fleet was beginning to show its age, the JMSDF attempted to obtain funding towards acquiring a replacement, but could not secure enough to develop an entirely new aircraft. Therefore, in 1995, ShinMaywa, as Shin Meiwa had been renamed, reportedly so that the name would be easier to pronounce for non-Japanese speakers, began work on a project to develop an upgraded and modernised version of the US-1A, initially referred to as the US-1A kai (US-1A 改 - meaning "improved US-1A").

This modified aircraft features aerodynamic refinements over its predecessor, a pressurised hull, and the adoption of more powerful Rolls-Royce AE 2100 engines and electronic cockpit instrumentation. The JMSDF also listed refinements for the amphibian, including improved handling while landing on water, better onboard patient transfer facilities, and improved search-and-rescue capabilities at sea.

In December 2003, flight testing of the type began, which was designated the US-2. The US-2 was designed with the capability to land in waves up to 3 m (9.8 ft) in height, corresponding to sea states of 4 to 5. In early 2007, ShinMaywa launched commercial production of the amphibian. Production is handled by several of Japan's aviation companies. Mitsubishi manufactures the outer wing sections and the rear part of the engine nacelles. NIPPI Corporation builds the watertight landing gear housings, and Kawasaki Heavy Industries produces the cockpit. Final assembly is performed by ShinMaywa around the US-2's hull. The production line can produce two aircraft at a time. In 2009, the first production US-2, which was outfitted for the search and rescue mission, was delivered to the Japan's Ministry of Defense.

In 2010, ShinMaywa unveiled specifications for a civil fire-fighting variant of its US-2 amphibian. It began marketing the new variant to potential overseas customers that same year. The fire-fighting model replaces one fuel tank with a 15 tonne water tank, reducing its maximum range to 2,300 km (1,245 nm) compared with the SAR's 4,700 km range. The tank is durable enough for salt water, foam and fire retardant. Other features include a pair of water scoops for collecting water, automatic foam mixing equipment and a computer-controlled water drop system.

== Operational history ==
=== Japan ===
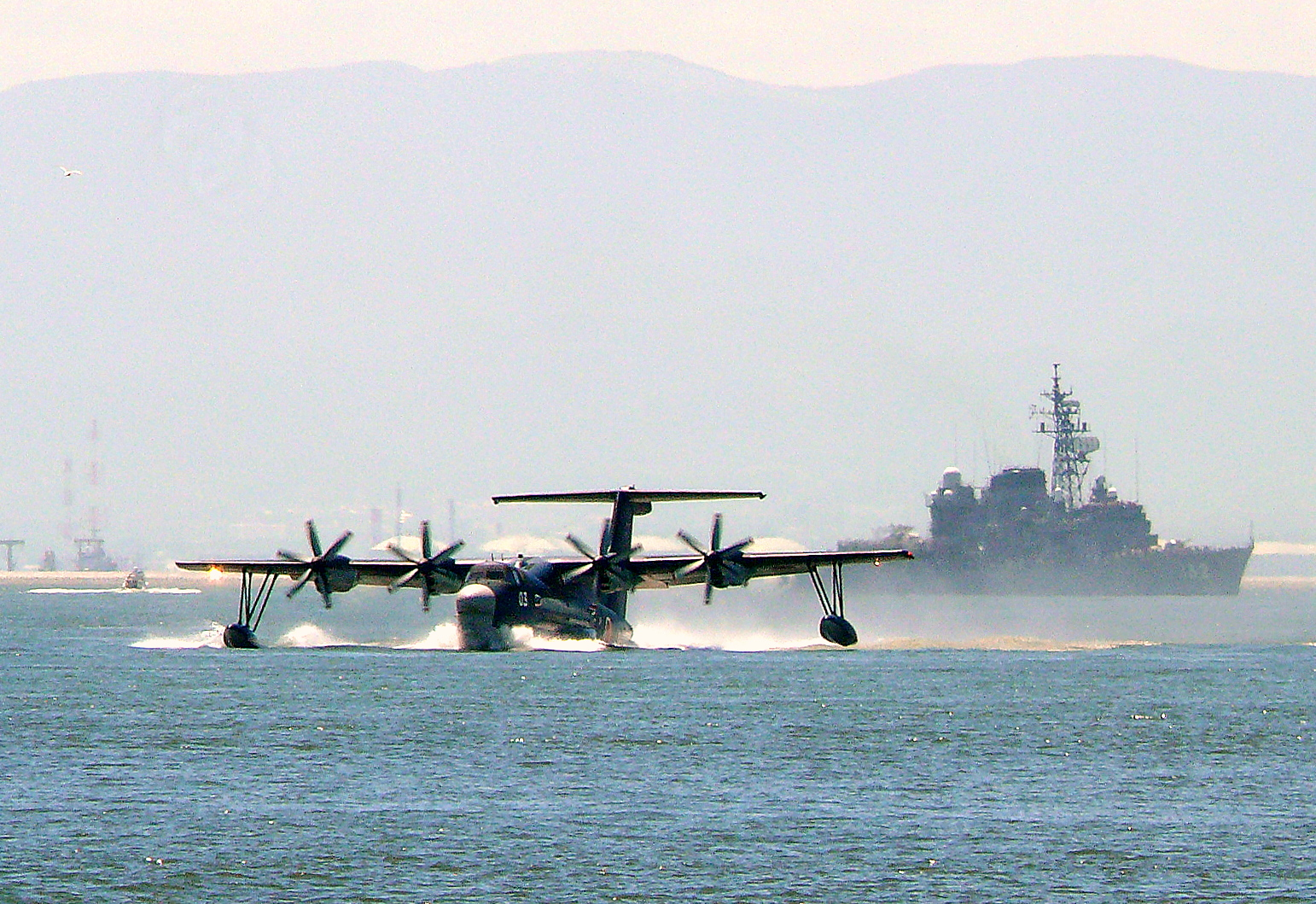
A ShinMeiwa US-2 search and rescue amphibian

The JMSDF intends to purchase up to 14 US-2s for its search and rescue needs. The type is operated by the 31st Fleet Air Wing (71st Air Force, 71st Flight Squadron) of the JMSDF from both Iwakuni Air Base and Atsugi Air Base. The introduction of the US-2 has enabled the withdrawal of the US-1A, the last of which performed its final flight in December 2017. By November 2018, six US-2s had been delivered, with two aircraft under production.

In April 2015, aircraft number 9905 was involved in an accident. Local news programs showed the aircraft floating nose down in the ocean. It was on a training mission near Cape Ashizuri in Shikoku, and was either taking off or landing when it sustained significant damage, reportedly having lost an engine. Four of the nineteen occupants were injured, but all were rescued successfully. The aircraft was written off.

In August 2024, the first US-2 in JMSDF service was retired after it was acquired from Shinmaywa in 2007.

On 27 April 2026, a ShinMaywa US-2 amphibious aircraft from the Japan Maritime Self-Defense Force (JMSDF) performed a water landing in the West Philippine Sea to conduct a joint casualty evacuation drill. The maneuver, part of the larger PhilippinesBalikatan 2026 exercises, were published by the U.S. Indo-Pacific Command on May 2.

The exercise took place near Oyster Bay, Palawan, Philippines, a strategic location currently being upgraded with U.S. support to serve as a maintenance hub for patrol vessels. This area is a critical staging ground for Philippine resupply missions to the Spratly Islands and served as one of several high-profile training sites during this year’s multi-national drills.

=== Export opportunities ===
==== India ====
Since the early 2010s, the Indian Navy has an established requirement for between 12 and 18 US-2 amphibians configured as search and rescue aircraft, at an anticipated cost of US$1.65 billion. The Indian Coast Guard has also shown interest in procuring three aircraft for its own purposes. It is expected that, if procured, several of these amphibians would be stationed in the Andaman and Nicobar Islands. Indian authorities have reportedly been keen to have the US-2 assembled in India via a licensing arrangement. Performing final assembly of the aircraft locally is expected to cost 25% less than in Japan. Negotiations between the two nations began in 2011.

The process of finalising purchase arrangements for the aircraft, which would represent the first sale of military equipment by Japan to India since the Second World War, have been protracted. In October 2016, ShinMaywa reduced the offered price to around US$113 million per aircraft. At one point, there were expectations that Japan and India would be signing a contract for the US-2 purchase in November 2016. The decision was deferred by Indian defence minister, Manohar Parrikar.

In March 2018, Japanese ambassador to India Kenji Hiramatsu informed The Hindu Business Line that talks between the two nations were still in progress. In April 2018, ShinMaywa signed a memorandum of understanding with Indian conglomerate Mahindra Group in support of future Indian sales. As of 2021, further negotiations were stopped due to pricing disagreement and the project was shelved.

==== Indonesia ====
Another prospective customer is Indonesia, which saw the need for an amphibious multipurpose aircraft that could also perform aerial firefighting. Japan offered the US-2 in May 2015 as part of a defense cooperation agreement with Indonesia. Around the same time, the Indonesian Air Force is also interested on acquiring Beriev Be-200 for firefighting. In August 2016, Japan proposed to sell three US-2 for US$100 million each. It was speculated in 2016 that Indonesia could be a key partner in the production of the US-2, potentially competing with India for workshare in the programme. Reportedly, without implementing outsourced production, ShinMaywa is unlikely to be unable to promptly fulfil the needs of a third customer due to its limited production capacity. ShinMaywa was in talks at the time with Indonesian Aerospace (PT Dirgantara Indonesia). Indonesia ended up choosing the Viking Air CL-515 in June 2019.

==== Others ====
In 2016, Thailand expressed interest in purchasing a number of US-2s as maritime patrol aircraft. Thailand is reportedly seeking to bolster its surveillance and anti-submarine warfare capabilities while developing deeper defense ties between itself and Japan.

In July 2018, following a series of deadly fires in the Attica region of Greece, the Greek government reportedly sought to order several US-2s to replace their aging firefighting fleet. If the sale is completed, it would be the first major defense procurement by Greece from a Japanese supplier.

== Operators ==
- Japan: Japan Maritime Self Defense Force.

=== Failed Contracts ===
- India: Deal did not proceed due to disagreements on pricing.
- Indonesia: Acquired the Viking Air CL-515 in June 2019.

== Specifications (US-2) ==
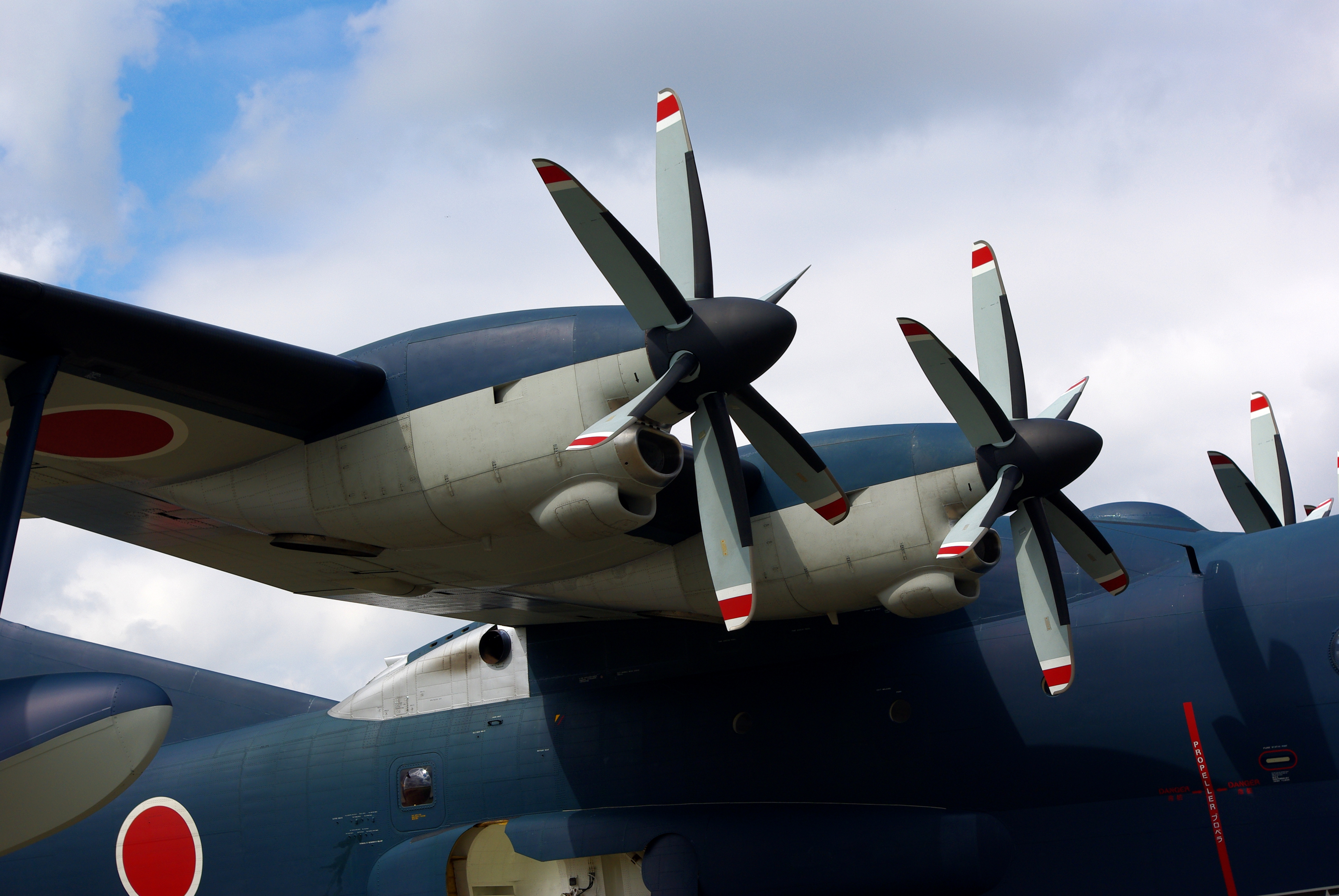
A side view of the engines and wing of a US-2

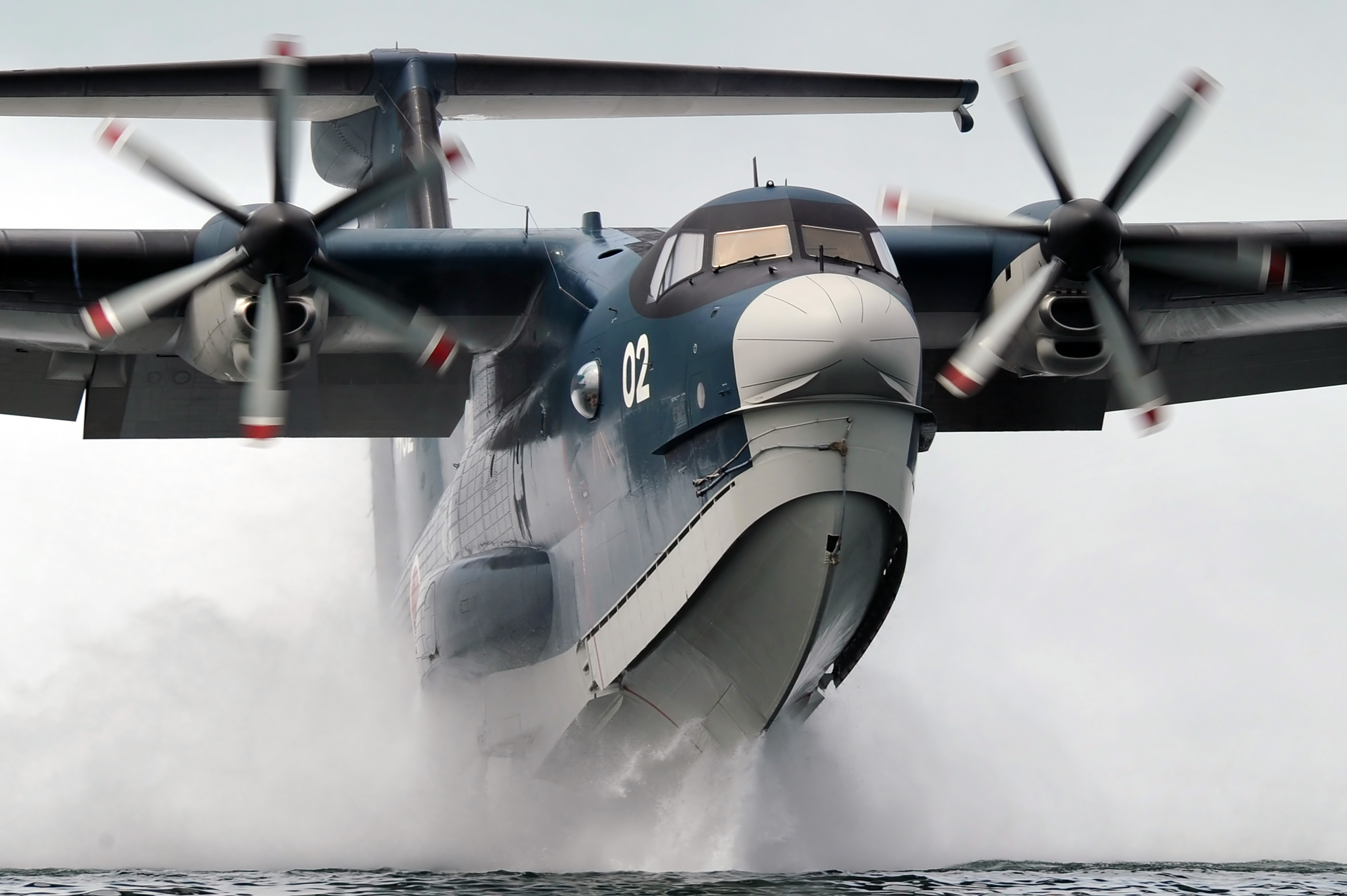
A US-2 during takeoff

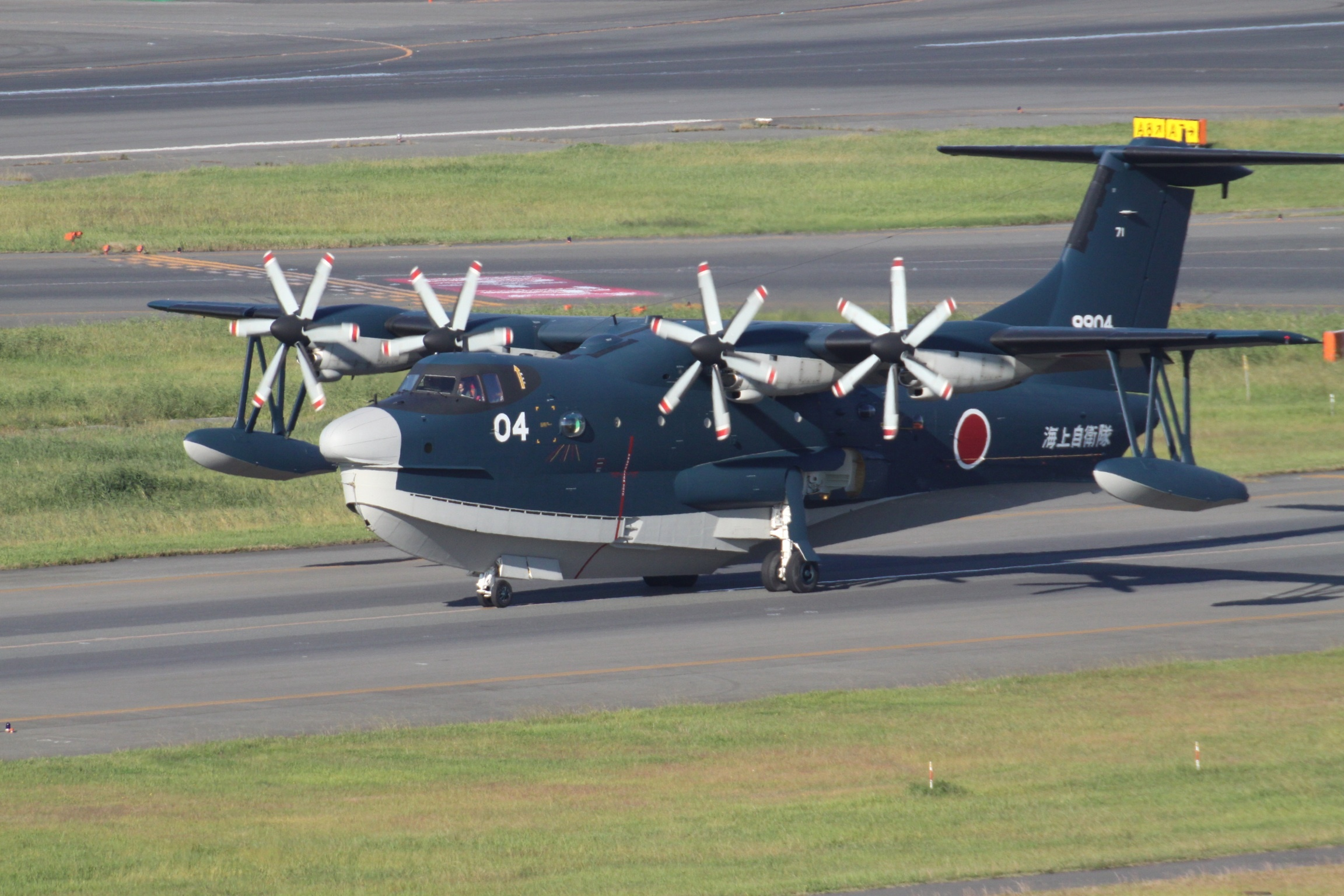
A JMSDF US-2 at Haneda Airport

Data from ShinMaywa

General characteristics

- Crew: 11 (2 pilots, 1 search-and-rescue coordinator, 2 on-board maintenance personnel, 3 divers, 2 paramedics, and 1 sensor operator)
- Capacity: 20 passengers or 12 stretchers
- Length: 33.46 m (109 ft 9 in)
- Wingspan: 33.15 m (108 ft 9 in)
- Height: 9.8 m (32 ft 2 in)
- Wing area: 135.8 m^{2} (1,462 sq ft)
- Empty weight: 25,630 kg (56,504 lb)
- Gross weight: 55,148 kg (121,581 lb)
- Max takeoff weight: 47,700 kg (105,160 lb) land take-off
- Powerplant: 4 × Rolls-Royce AE 2100J turboprop, 3,424 kW (4,592 hp) each
- Powerplant: 1 × LHTEC T800 turboshaft, 1,017 kW (1,364 hp) (compressor for boundary layer control)
- Propellers: 6-bladed Dowty R414

Performance

- Maximum speed: 560 km/h (350 mph, 300 kn)
- Cruise speed: 480 km/h (300 mph, 260 kn) at 6,000 m (20,000 ft)
- Stall speed: 90 km/h (56 mph, 49 kn)
- Range: 4,700 km (2,900 mi, 2,300 nmi)
- Service ceiling: 7,195 m (23,606 ft)
- Takeoff distance on ground: 490 m (1,610 ft) at MTOW
- Landing distance on ground: 1,500 m (4,900 ft) at MTOW
- Takeoff distance on water: 280 m (920 ft) at Loaded weight
- Landing distance on water: 330 m (1,080 ft) at Loaded weight

== See also ==
Related development

- ShinMaywa US-1A

Aircraft of comparable role, configuration, and era

- AVIC AG600

Related lists

- List of military aircraft of Japan
- List of flying boats
