= Shin Meiwa US-1A =

Japanese STOL aircraft

PS-1 / US-1A
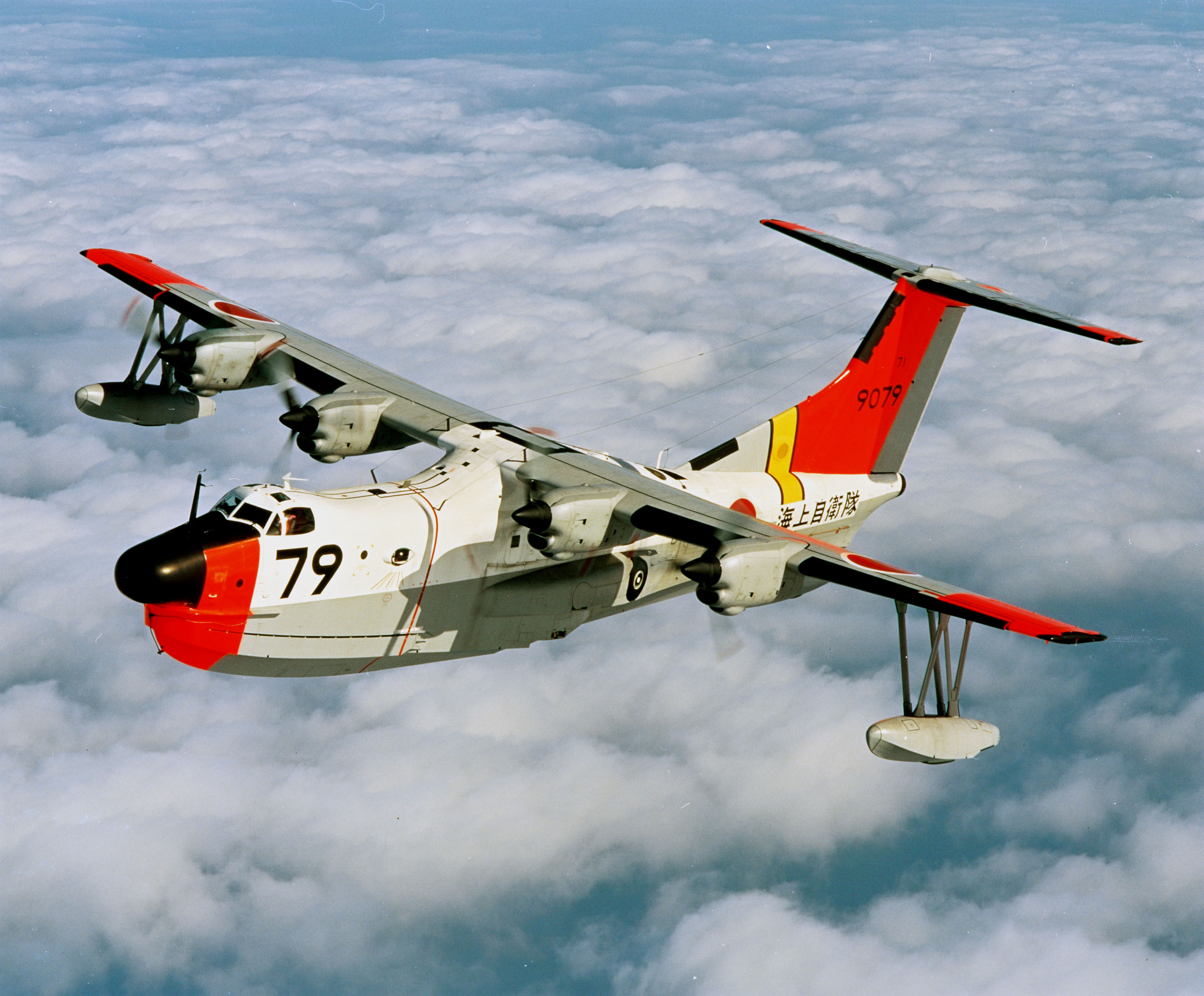
- A US-1A in flight

General information
- Type: Air-sea rescue amphibian
- Manufacturer: Shin Meiwa
- Status: Retired
- Primary user: Japan Maritime Self Defense Force

History
- Manufactured: PS-1: 23; US-1: 6 US-1A: 14
- Introduction date: 1971 (PS-1)
- First flight: 5 October 1967 (PX-S)
- Retired: 2017
- Developed into: ShinMaywa US-2

The Shin Meiwa PS-1 and US-1A are retired large STOL aircraft designed for anti-submarine warfare (ASW) and air-sea rescue (SAR) work respectively by Japanese aircraft manufacturer Shin Meiwa. The PS-1 anti-submarine warfare (ASW) variant is a flying boat which carried its own beaching gear on board, while the search-and-rescue (SAR) orientated US-1A is a true amphibian.

Development of the PS-1 has its origins in flying boat research performed by the Shin Meiwa in the 1950s. The company, believing that their design was capable of regular use upon the open sea, petitioned the Japanese military to acquire the type as a maritime patrol aircraft (MPA). Following the demonstration of a converted Grumman HU-16 Albatross testbed aircraft, referred to as the UF-XS, the Japan Maritime Self-Defense Force (JMSDF) awarded Shin Meiwa a contract in 1966 to further develop its design via two further prototypes, which were designated PS-X. In 1969, the JMSDF placed the first order for an eventual fleet of 21 ASW aircraft, designated PS-1. Orders for the SAR variant, designated US-1A, were issued in the 1970s.

Shin Meiwa were keen to develop additional variants and derivative aircraft, including substantially larger designs which they had studied, but many of these ambitions remained as paper projects only. In the 1980s, the JMSDF adopted land-based Lockheed P-3 Orions, displacing the PS-1s from the ASW role and leading to the variant's retirement in 1989. Following the withdrawal of the last active US-1A in 2017,the type has been replaced by the ShinMaywa US-2, a newer design.

== Design and development ==
=== Background ===
Following the end of the Second World War and the start of the Occupation of Japan, a ban on aircraft manufacturing imposed in December 1945 required Japan's aircraft industry to find other work. In the late 1940s, Japanese aircraft manufacturer Kawanishi Aircraft Company reorganised itself, becoming ShinMeiwa Industries. In the 1950s, the emergence of the Cold War between the United States and the Soviet Union led to the aircraft construction ban being rescinded.

Shin Meiwa, which had turned to heavy machinery and engine manufacturing for the intervening years, decided to resurrect their old aircraft works. Initially, the company focused on smaller efforts, such as subcontracting work, the production of drop tanks, and performing airframe overhauls of both Japanese and American aircraft, such as the US Navy's Martin P5M Marlin flying boats. However, senior figures, such as chief aircraft designer Shizo Kikuhara and founder Ryuzo Kawanishi were keen to pursue projects of a greater scope.

In the early 1950s, Kawanishi formed a committee, headed by Kikuhara, tasked with developing seaplane designs that would feature greater seaworthiness. Unlike most seaplanes, they held the ambitious aim of producing an aircraft that could land upon rough seas and encounter little impact from waves and spray. By 1959, the committee felt that it had developed an appropriate design to meet its specification.

In 1961, Kikuhara, who now headed up the company's Amphibian Development Division, was lobbying the Japanese Defense Agency to consider the adoption of a flying boat to meet Japan's requirement for an anti-submarine warfare (ASW) patrol aircraft. Shin Meiwa stated that they would produce a specialised design to undertake the ASW mission. Crucial support came from the US Navy, who were keen to see Japan's ASW capabilities expand to help track and contain the growing Soviet submarine presence in the Pacific.

=== Concept and testing ===
To support the development, the US Navy at Shin Meiwa's request provided a single Grumman HU-16 Albatross flying boat, which was extensively modified and then reassembled into a flying testbed aircraft, referred to as the UF-XS. The converted flying boat featured numerous adaptations, including a novel boundary layer control system to provide enhanced Short Takeoff/Landing (STOL) performance. The Albatross's two 1,425 hp (1,063 kW) Wright R-1820 radial engines were supplemented by two 600 hp (450 kW) Pratt & Whitney R-1340 radial engines on the aircraft's modified wings, with an additional 1,250 shp (930 kW) General Electric T58 turboshaft inside the aircraft's hull to drive the boundary layer control system. The UF-XS also featured a new T-tail arrangement which resembled that of the advanced variant of the Martin P5M-2 Marlin.

From 1962 onwards, the UF-XS performed numerous test flights, demonstrating the improved features which enabled a flying boat to both land and take-off from the open ocean. These tests were closely followed and critiqued by the Japanese military. Over time, the UF-XS continued to be modified to improve its stability and other key performance criteria. In 1966, the Japan Maritime Self-Defense Force (JMSDF) awarded Shin Meiwa a contract to further develop its design to produce a patrol aircraft capable of the ASW mission. Two further prototypes were constructed under the designation PS-X.

In addition to Shin Meiwa, other Japanese companies, such as Fuji Heavy Industries and NIPPI Corporation, also played major roles in the PS-X's development. The adaptions resulted in significant seaworthiness improvements. During tests conducted in the Kii Channel in 1968, the PS-X successfully landed amid formidable four-meter waves, despite these being in excess of its design goal of three meters.

In 1969, having been suitably impressed, the JMSDF issued a production order for a batch of 21 aircraft, which were given the designation PS-1, to meet its ASW requirement. In spite of its demonstrated performance, the project was not without its critics. The programme soon became politically controversial as its relatively small production run resulted in an extremely high unit-cost for these aircraft, largely due to the inherent costs involved in the development of brand new aircraft designs. For its part, Shin Meiwa made efforts to commercialise design elements of the aircraft, such as its hydraulics and engine control systems. It also exported its rough-sea roll-damping technology to other seaplane companies.

=== Further development ===
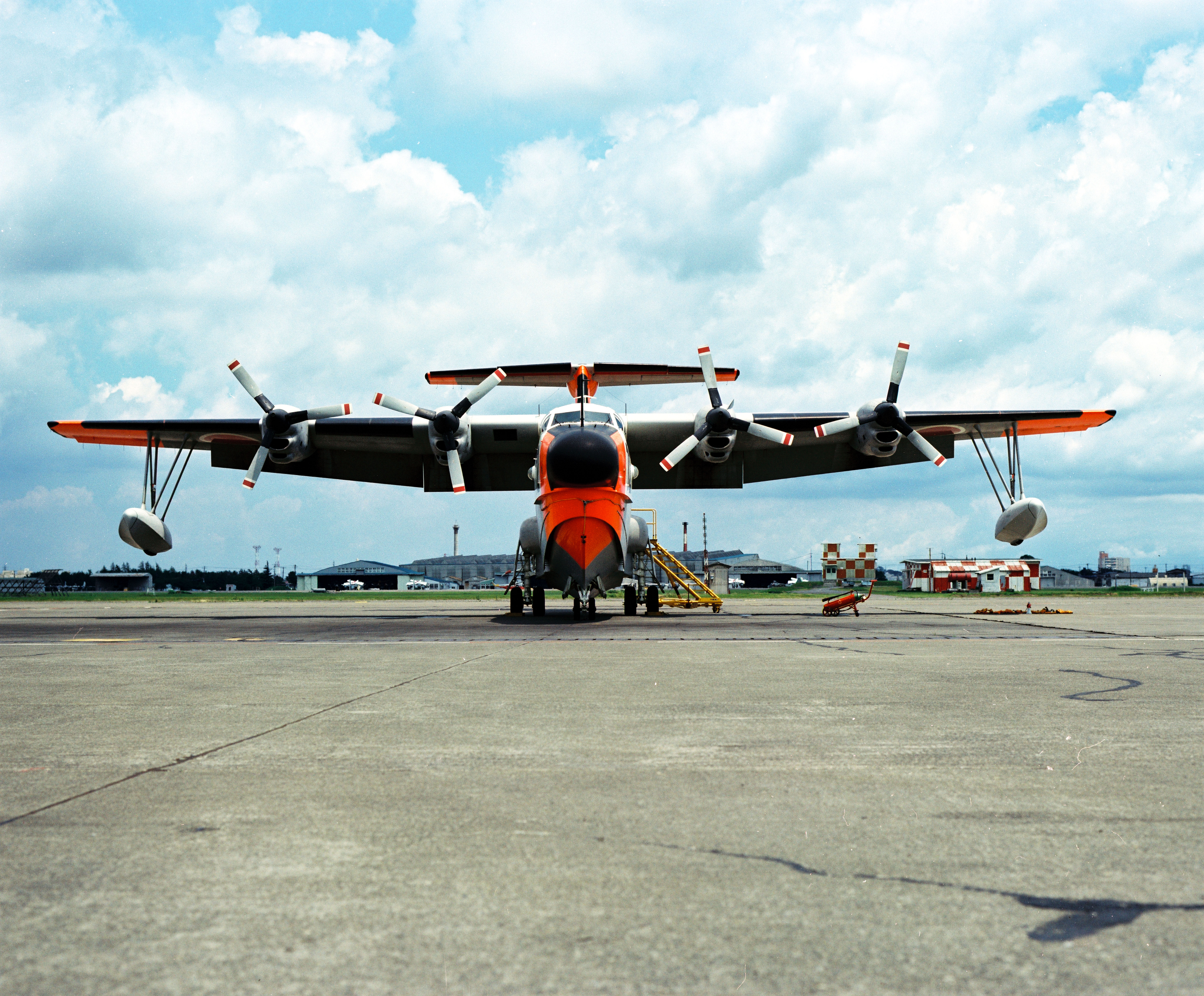
A head-on view of a JMSDF US-1A parked on land

The PS-1 had not been in service long before the JMSDF requested the development of a search-and-rescue (SAR) variant. Shin Meiwa, being keen to pursue the aircraft's development, embarked upon fulfilling this request. By deleting much of the PS-1's military equipment, room was freed up to provide the aircraft with a greater fuel capacity, retractable landing gear, and rescue equipment. The new variant, which was designated the US-1A, could also quickly be converted for troop-carrying.

The US-1A was Japan's first amphibian, operating from land and sea, which meant that it could transfer survivors to land facilities via ambulance more quickly. First flown on October 15, 1974, it was accepted into service in 1975 and eventually 19 aircraft were purchased. From the seventh aircraft on, an uprated version of the original engine was used. All aircraft were eventually modified to this US-1A standard.

In the 1990s, by which point the US-1A fleet was beginning to show its age, the JMSDF attempted to obtain funding towards acquiring a replacement, but could not secure enough to develop an entirely new aircraft. Therefore, in 1995, ShinMaywa (as Shin Meiwa had been renamed, reportedly so that the name would be easier to pronounce for non-Japanese speakers) set about planning to produce an upgraded version of the US-1A, initially referred to as the US-1A kai (US-1A 改 - "improved US-1A"). This aircraft features numerous aerodynamic refinements and modernised systems, along with a pressurised hull, and the adoption of more powerful Rolls-Royce AE 2100 engines. Flight tests of the new variant began in December 2003. The JMSDF has chosen to purchase up to 14 of these aircraft, which entered service as the ShinMaywa US-2.

==== Unbuilt concept aircraft ====
In 1977, Shin Meiwa revealed that it had several ideas for its STOL flying boat concept on the drawing board, but ultimately none of these were ever built. They were the Shin Meiwa LA (Light Amphibian), a 40-passenger light amphibian for inter-island feeder service; the 400-passenger Shin Meiwa MA (Medium Amphibian); the Shin Meiwa MS (Medium Seaplane) a 300-passenger long-range flying boat with its own beaching gear; and the gargantuan Shin Meiwa GS (Giant Seaplane) with a capacity for 1,200 passengers, seated on three decks. Unlike the Shin Meiwa LA and MA which were like the US-1 in design, the Shin Meiwa MS and GS had their engines located in front of and above the wing to take advantage of the Coandă effect. In the end, none of the four designs got beyond paper studies.

== Operational history ==
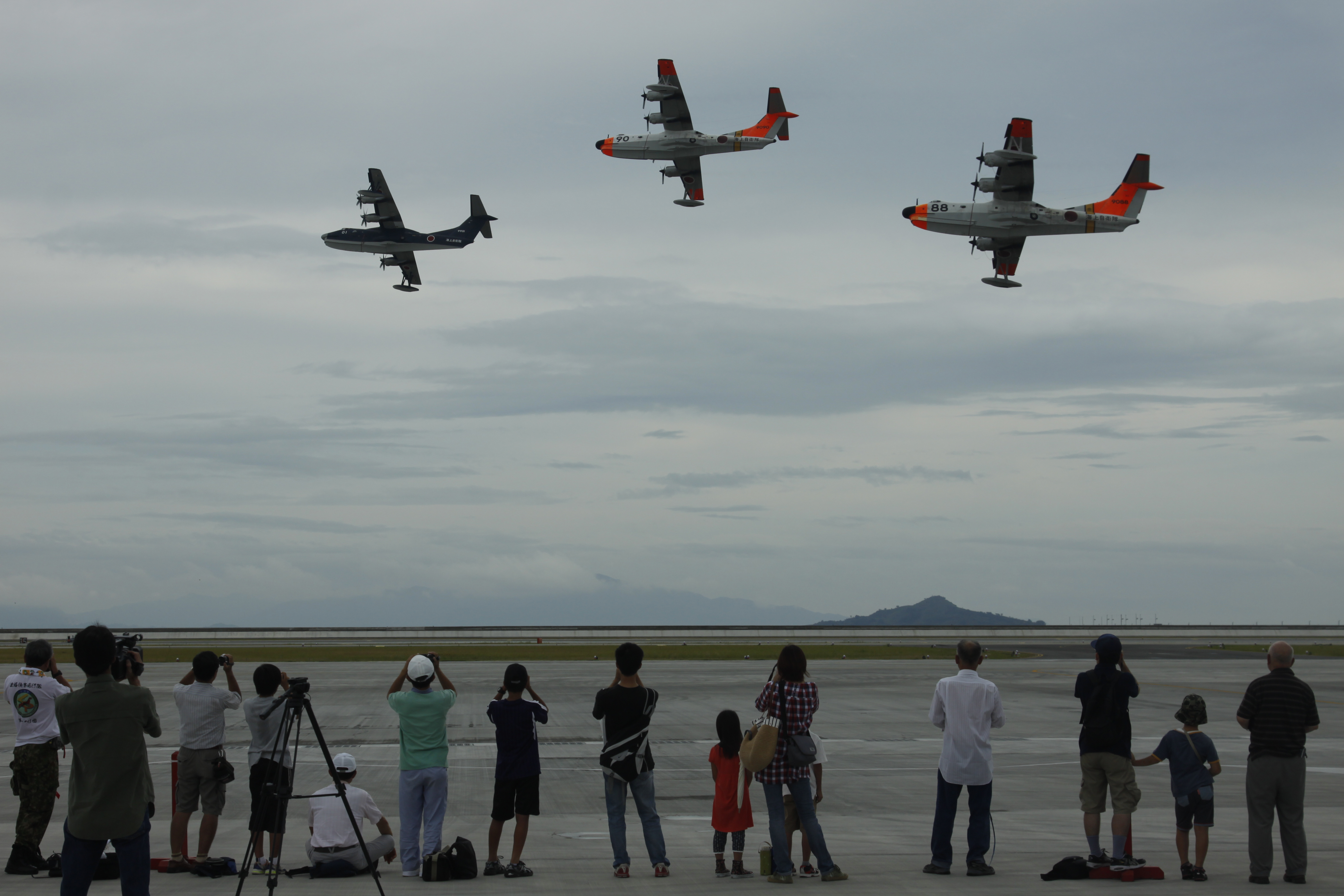
A pair of US-1As led by a US-2 performing an aerial demonstration above MCAS Iwakuni, Yamaguchi Prefecture, Japan, 2011

Between 1971 and 1978, 21 PS-1 flying boats entered service with the JMSDF. Starting in 1973, they were operated as Fleet Air Wing 31. The PS-1 ASW variant carried homing torpedoes, depth charges and 127mm Zuni rockets as offensive armament, but lacked any defensive weapons. It was equipped with dipping sonar, which had limited use as it required the aircraft to land on water to deploy. It could also carry 20 sonobuoys. It had a crew of ten: a pilot, co-pilot, flight engineer, navigator and six sensor/weapons operators. On a typical ASW mission, a PS-1 would range over hundreds of square miles of ocean, landing between 12 and 16 times to dip its sonar.

The type was capable of numerous feats, such as being able to routinely land in seas with waves of up to 3 metres (9.8 ft) in height. Water distance for takeoff or landing with 79,400 pounds (36,000 kg) aircraft weight was 720 feet (220 m) with no wind or 500 feet (150 m) into a 15-knot wind. Apart from the boundary layer control system, which was powered by an independent gas turbine housed within the fuselage, the aircraft had a number of other innovative features, including a system to suppress spray during water handling, and directing the propwash from the aircraft's four turboprop engines over its wings to create yet more lift.

In 1976, a single PS-1 was experimentally modified to perform aerial firefighting missions. It possessed an internal capacity of 7,350 litres (1,940 US gal) of water. In the 1980s, the JMSDF decided to replace the PS-1 in the ASW role with land-based Lockheed P-3 Orions. The last examples of the ASW variant were phased out of service in 1989. It was outlived by the Search-and-Rescue oriented US-1A fleet, which continued to be used into the 21st century.

The US-1A's first rescue was from a Greek vessel in 1976. Despite having been envisioned largely to perform air-sea rescues of military personnel, the US-1A has mostly been involved in civilian assistance operations. Between 1976 and 1999, Japan's US-1A fleet participated in over 500 rescues and were responsible for the saving of 550 lives. The US-1A was retired in December 2017. According to aviation periodical Air International, 827 people have been rescued by US-1s since the type entered service during 1976. It has been succeeded in its role by the modernised US-2.

== Operators ==
Japan

- Japan Maritime Self Defense Force

== Accidents and incidents ==
- On 6 April 1977, a PS-1 landed hard and sank at MCAS Iwakuni, killing 1 of the 14 occupants.
- On 17 May 1978, a PS-1 crashed northwest of Takaoka, Toyama, killing all 13 occupants.
- On 26 April 1983, a PS-1 crashed at MCAS Iwakuni, killing 11 of the 14 occupants.
- On 27 February 1984, a PS-1 crashed in the Sea of Japan, killing all 12 occupants.
- On 21 February 1995, a US-1A crashed near Oki Island, killing 10 of the 12 occupants.

== Aircraft on display ==
- 5813 – PS-1A on static display at Iwakuni Air Base in Iwakuni, Yamaguchi.
- 9076 – US-1A on static display at the Kanoya Air Base Museum in Kanoya, Kagoshima.
- 9078 – US-1A on static display at the Gifu-Kakamigahara Air and Space Museum in Kakamigahara, Gifu.
- 9090 – US-1A on static display at Iwakuni Air Base in Iwakuni, Yamaguchi.

== Specifications (US-1A) ==
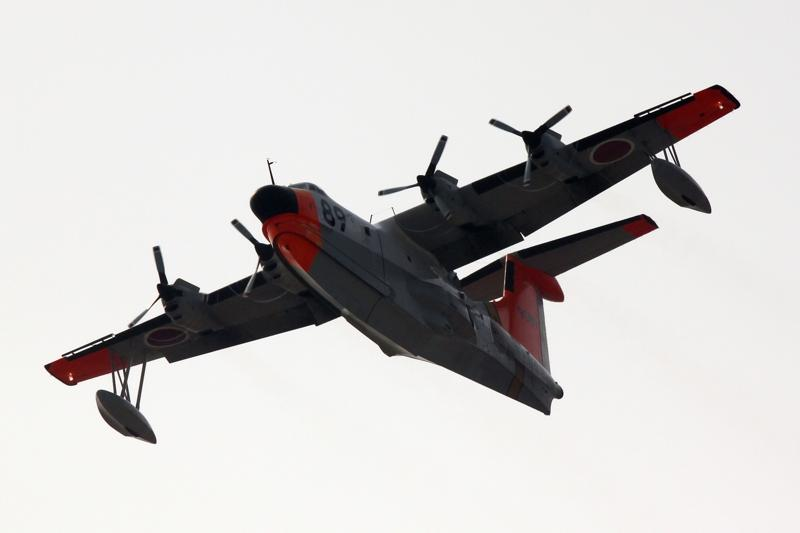
US-1A flying boat

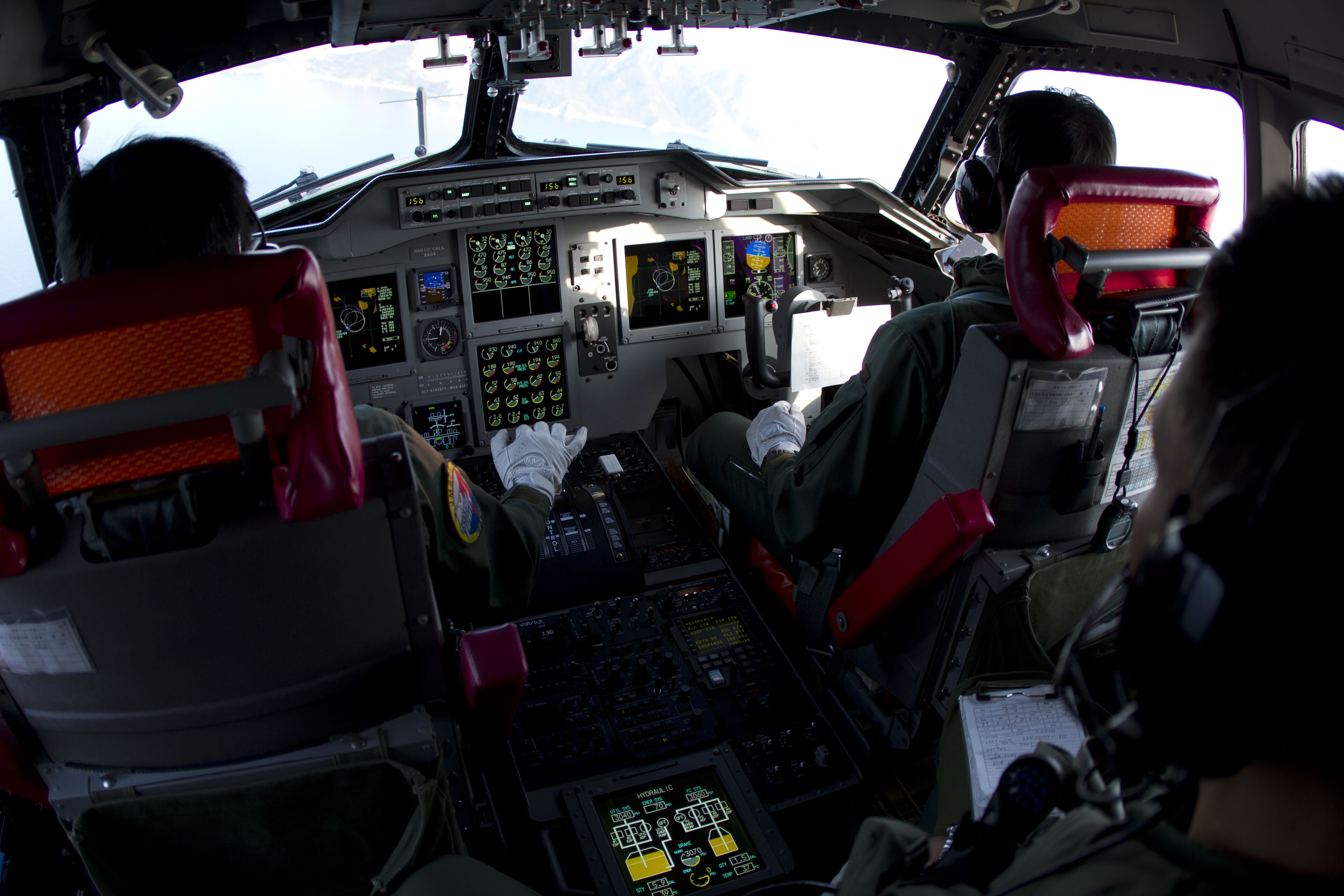
Flight deck of a US-1A

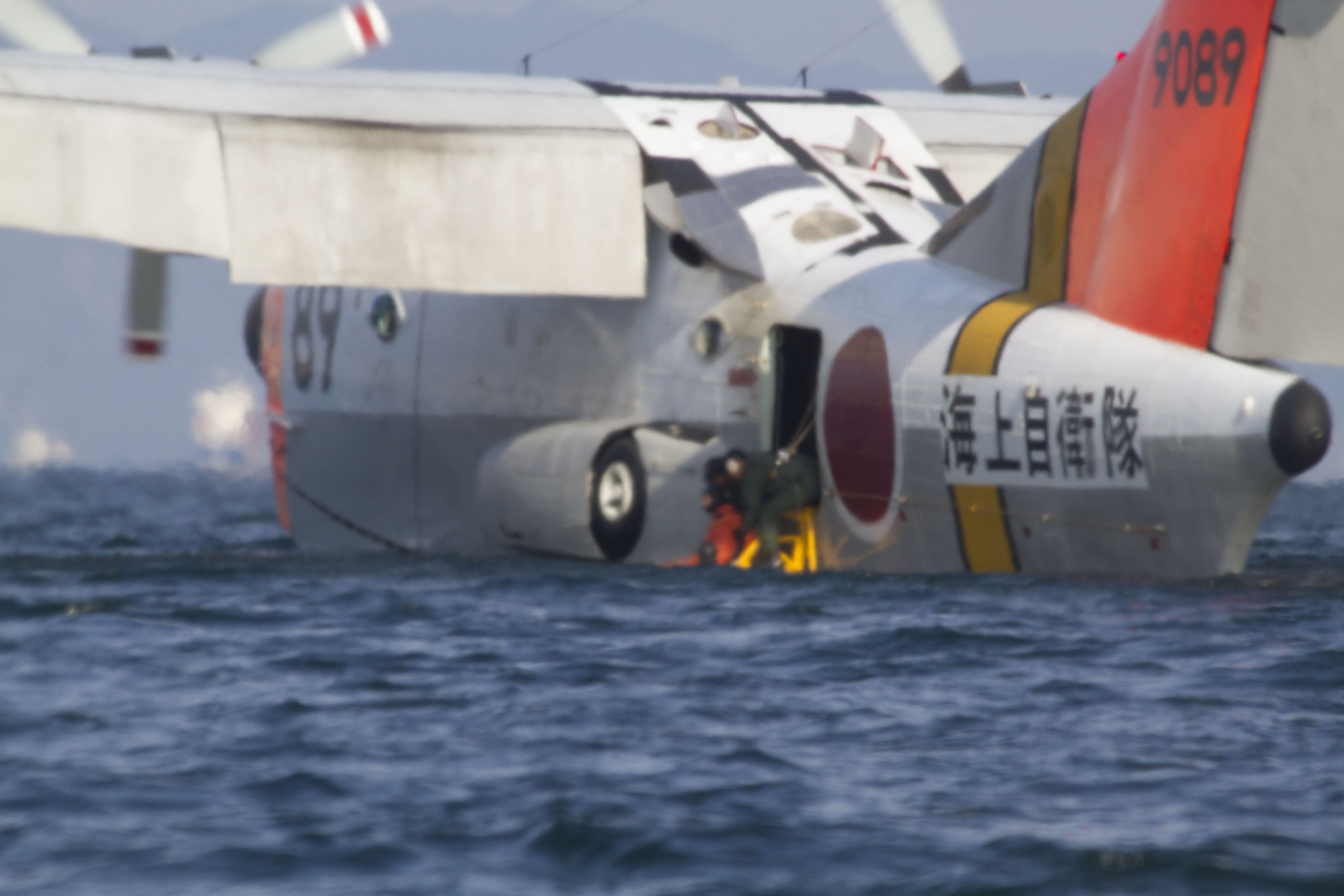
A US-1A floating on the sea

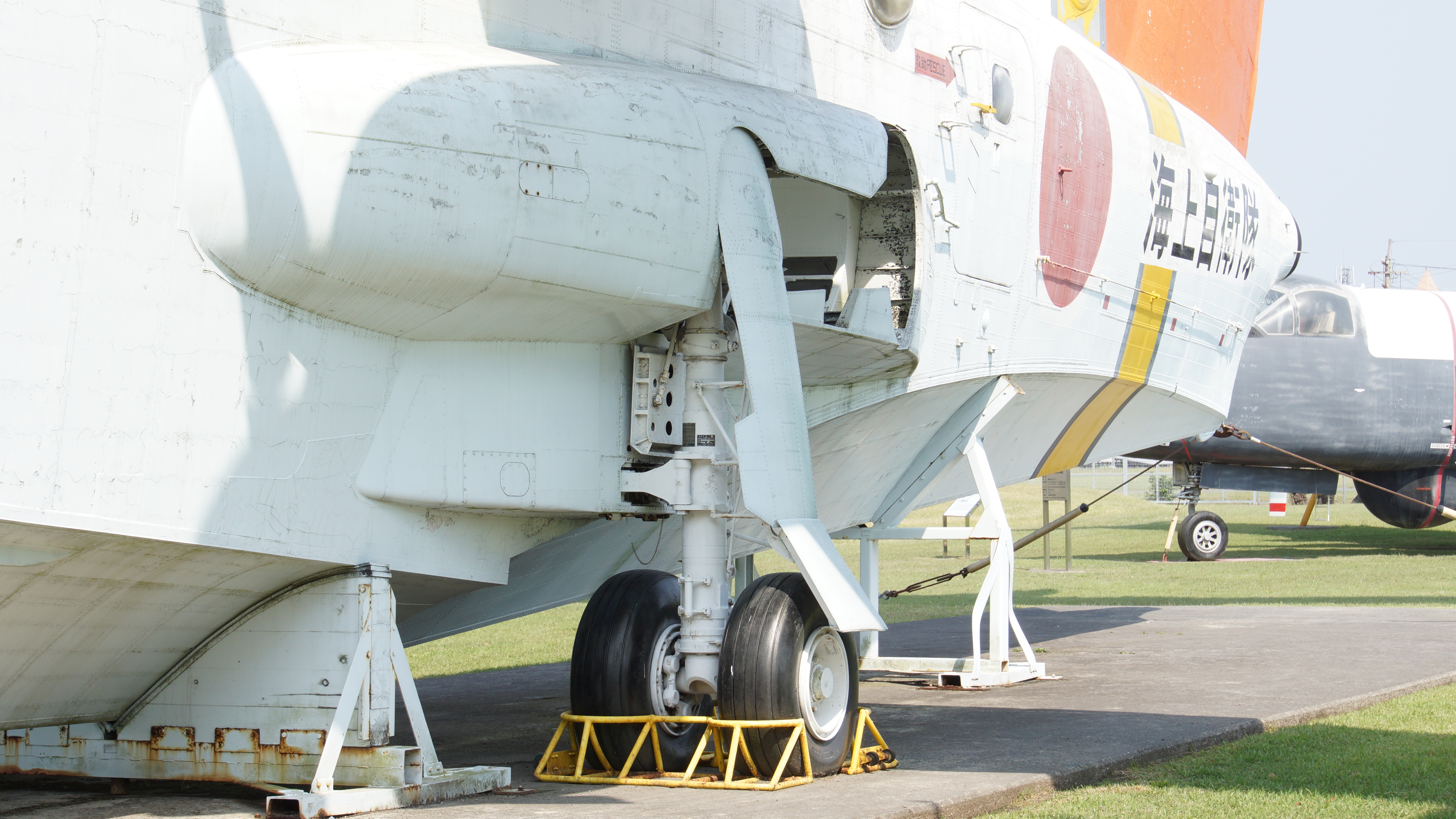
Deployed landing gear of a US-1A

Data from Jane's All The World's Aircraft 1988-89

General characteristics

- Crew: 4 flight crew, 1 auxiliary crew seat and 2 observers
- Capacity: 20 seated passengers / 12 stretchers
- Length: 33.46 m (109 ft 9 in)
- Wingspan: 33.15 m (108 ft 9 in)
- Height: 9.95 m (32 ft 8 in)
- Wing area: 135.82 m^{2} (1,462.0 sq ft)
- Aspect ratio: 8.1
- Empty weight: 23,300 kg (51,368 lb)
- Gross weight: 36,000 kg (79,366 lb)
- Max takeoff weight: 43,000 kg (94,799 lb) from water

45,000 kg (99,208 lb) from land

- Fuel capacity: 11,640 L (3,070 US gal; 2,560 imp gal) usable fuel in five wing tanks + 10,849 L (2,866 US gal; 2,386 imp gal) usable fuel in two fuselage tanks
- Powerplant: 4 × Ishikawajima-Harima / General Electric T64-IHI-10J turboprop engines, 2,605 kW (3,493 hp) each
- Powerplant: 1 × Ishikawajima-Harima / General Electric T58-IHI-10-M2 turboshaft Compressed air generator driving a C-2 compressor
- Propellers: 3-bladed Sumitomo built Hamilton Standard 63E60-27, 4.42 m (14 ft 6 in) diameter fully-feathering reversible constant-speed propellers

Performance

- Maximum speed: 511 km/h (318 mph, 276 kn)

522 km/h (324 mph; 282 kn) at 3,050 m (10,007 ft)

- Cruise speed: 426 km/h (265 mph, 230 kn) at 3,050 m (10,007 ft)
- Range: 3,817 km (2,372 mi, 2,061 nmi) at 426 km/h (265 mph; 230 kn) at 3,050 m (10,007 ft)
- Service ceiling: 7,195 m (23,606 ft) at MTOW

8,655 m (28,396 ft) at 36,000 kg (79,366 lb)

- Rate of climb: 8.133 m/s (1,601.0 ft/min) at MTOW

11.883 m/s (2,339.2 ft/min) at 36,000 kg (79,366 lb)

- Wing loading: 331.4 kg/m^{2} (67.9 lb/sq ft)
- Power/mass: 0.232 kW/kg (0.141 hp/lb)
- Take-off distance to 15 m (49 ft): 655 m (2,149 ft) 30° flap, BLC on, on land
- Landing distance from 15 m (49 ft): 810 m (2,657 ft) 40° flap, BLC on, on land
- Take-off distance: 555 m (1,821 ft) at 45,000 kg (99,208 lb) 40° flap, BLC on, on water
- Landing distance: 220 m (722 ft) at 36,000 kg (79,366 lb) 60° flap, BLC on, on water

Avionics

- APS-80N Ocean search radar

== See also ==
Related development

- ShinMaywa US-2

Aircraft of comparable role, configuration, and era

- Harbin SH-5
- Beriev Be-12
- Martin P5M Marlin
- Canadair CL-215

Related lists

- List of military aircraft of Japan
- List of flying boats
