= LHTEC =

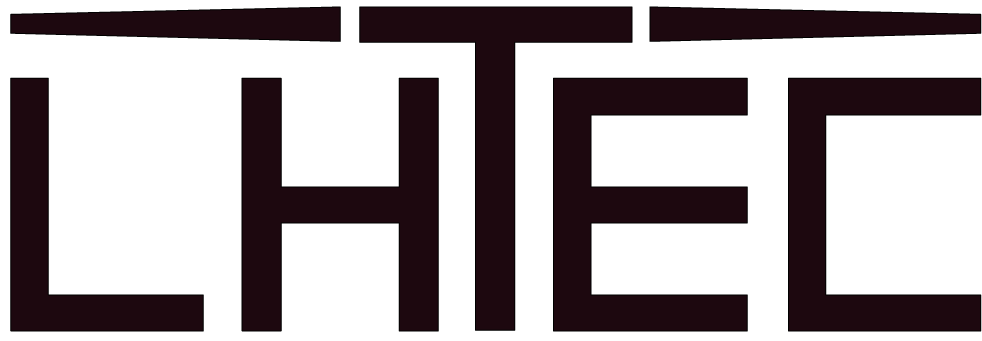
- Type: Aerospace Engine Manufacturer
- Industry: Aerospace & Defense
- Founded: 1985
- Headquarters: Indianapolis, Indiana
- Area served: Worldwide
- Key people: Daryl Mastin, President
- Products: Gas turbine engines
- Parent: Rolls-Royce Corporation and Honeywell Aerospace

LHTEC (Light Helicopter Turbine Engine Company) is a joint venture between Rolls-Royce and Honeywell. The company was originally a partnership between the Allison Engine Company and AlliedSignal Aerospace. In 1995 Rolls-Royce acquired Allison, and AlliedSignal merged with Honeywell in 1999, and adopted its name.

The partnership was formed to develop the T800 turboshaft engine for the United States Army's RAH-66 Comanche armed reconnaissance helicopter. Despite the cancellation of this 650+ aircraft project, the company has been able to sell the T800, and its civil CTS800 model, for other applications, namely the AgustaWestland Super Lynx and AW159 Wildcat.

== Products ==
- LHTEC T800/CTS800 turboshaft and CTP800 turboprop
