= Improved Turbine Engine Program =

U.S. Army project to develop a new turbine engine

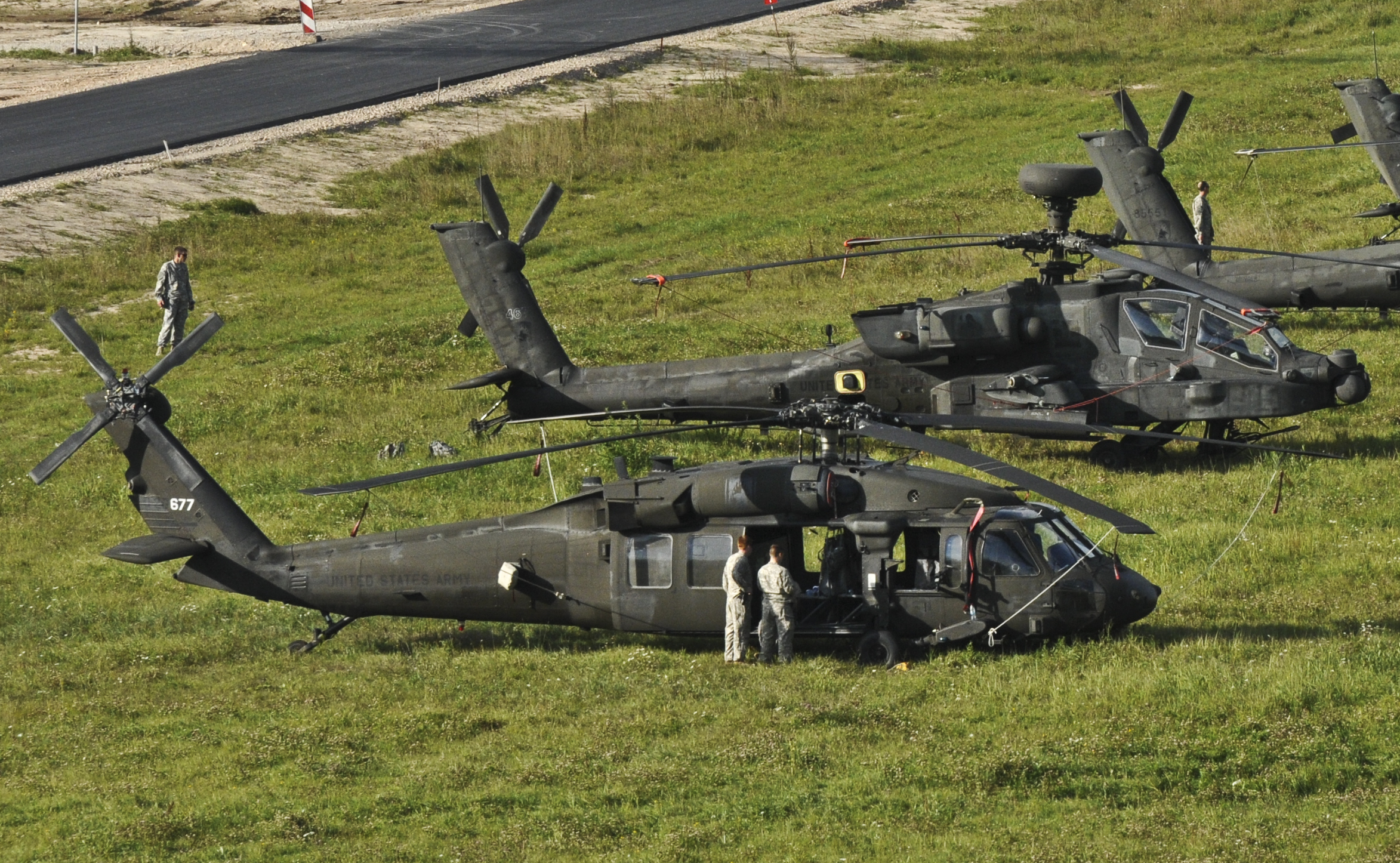
- Both the UH-60 and AH-64 are to be powered by the Improved Turbine Engine (ITE).

General information
- Issued by: United States Army
- Proposals: ATEC T900; General Electric T901

History
- Initiated: July 2009
- Concluded: February 2019
- Outcome: T901 selected
- Related: Joint Multi-Role

The Improved Turbine Engine Program (ITEP), formerly the Advanced Affordable Turbine Engine (AATE) program, is a United States Army project to develop a General Electric T700 replacement for the UH-60 Black Hawk and AH-64 Apache, improving fuel consumption, power, durability and cost. Honeywell and Pratt & Whitney formed the ATEC joint venture to develop the T900, while GE Aviation builds the T901. In February 2019, the US Army selected the GE T901 as the winner of the program.

== History ==
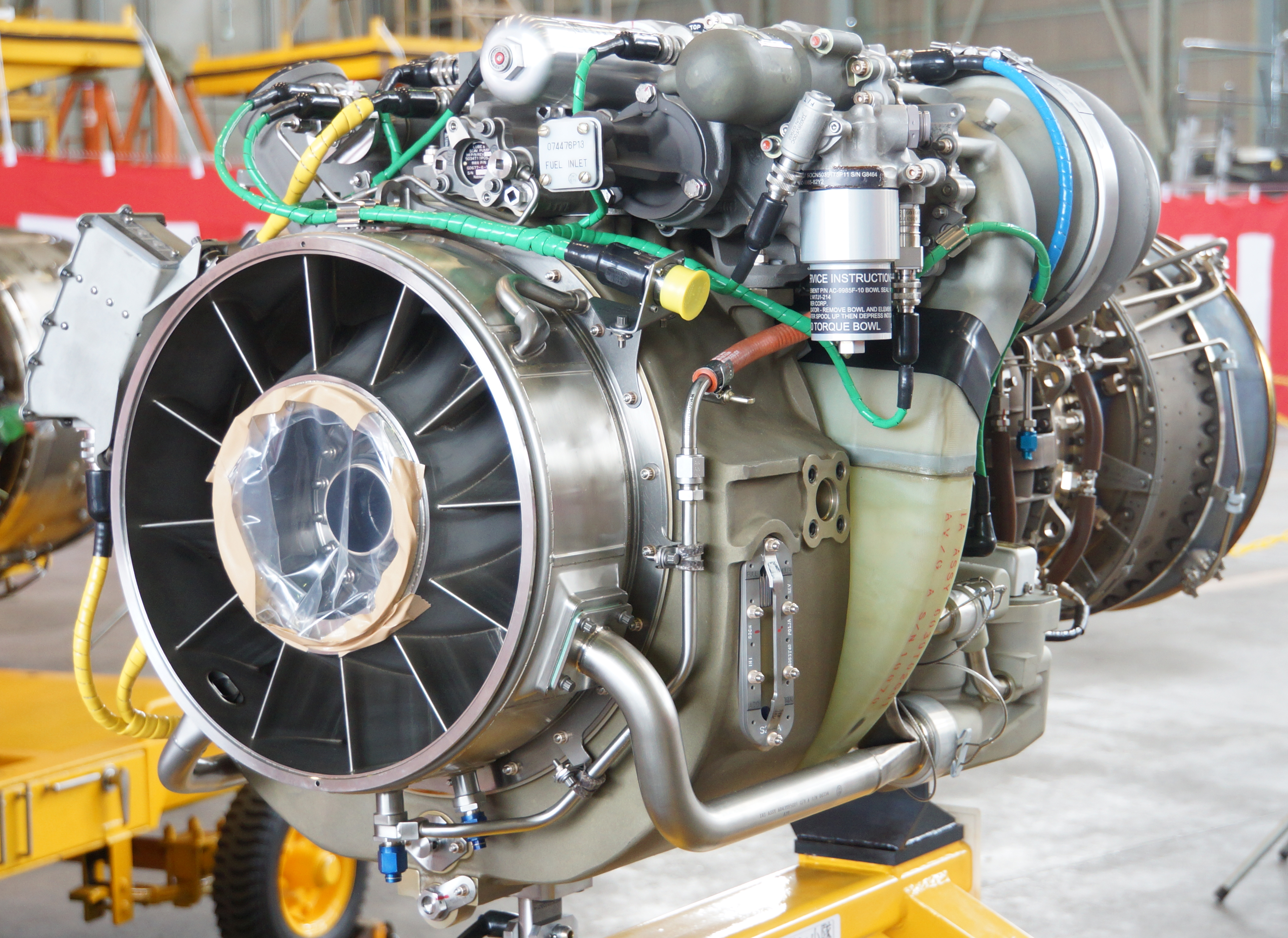
The new turboshaft should replace the GE T700.

In December 2006, the U.S. Army's Aviation Applied Technology Directorate (AATD) solicited proposals for the 3000 shp Advanced Affordable Turbine Engine (AATE) free-turbine turboshaft to replace the GE T700 that currently power the UH-60 Black Hawk and AH-64 Apache rotorcraft, leveraging the DoD/NASA/DOE VAATE program. Refitting the existing fleet of twin-engine Black Hawks and Apaches would require a total of 6,215 engines, including spares.

Any aircraft that currently uses the T700 or its commercial derivative, the CT7, also could be re-powered by the AATE, including commercial rotorcraft like the Sikorsky S-92. Sikorsky is considering it for the single-turbine S-97 Raider instead of its single GE CT7/T700; in addition, AATE could also power the Joint Multi-Role (JMR) helicopter.

In 2007, Honeywell and Pratt & Whitney formed the Advanced Turbine Engine Company (ATEC) joint venture. The science & technology phase to subsidize development of AATE consisted of two contracts: one was awarded in May 2008 to ATEC for $108 million to develop the HPW3000, and the other was awarded to GE Aviation in late 2007 for the GE3000. The four-and-a-half year science and technology phase covered durability and performance demonstration testing and was scheduled to conclude in 2013, but tests continued through 2014.

In July 2009, the United States Army announced the development of AATE would continue under the Improved Turbine Engine Program (ITEP); ITEP would result in an engine that would improve the AH-64 and UH-60 hot and high capacities and increase combat radius. In August 2016, ATEC and GE were awarded 24-month contracts under ITEP to take their engines through preliminary design review; this phase culminated in April 2018 with ATEC and GE demonstrating their prototypes to the Army.

On 1 February 2019, the US Army selected the GE T901 as the winner of the ITEP program, awarding the Engineering and Manufacturing Development (EMD) contract for $517 million. Later that same month, ATEC protested the selection of the GE T901 over its T900 in a filing with the Government Accountability Office (GAO). The GAO denied the protest in a filing posted on May 30, 2019.

Critical design review in the second quarter of 2020 would lead to first engine testing in the third quarter of 2021 before flight tests, and a production decision in 2024.

== Design and performance goals ==
In addition to 3,000-shp output, the targets for AATE were a 25% reduction in fuel consumption (less than 0.347 lb/(hp⋅h), 211 g/kWh), a 65% improvement in power to weight (more than 6.5 hp/lb, 10.7 kW/kg), a 20% improvement in design life (more than 6000 hours and 15000 cycles), a 35% reduction in production (less than $650k per engine) and maintenance cost, and a 15% reduction in product development cost. The 3,000-shp goal for AATE is a 50% increase over the most powerful T700-701D variant, but would also require upgrades to gearbox, transmission, rotor blades, and tail rotor.

Both the ATEC and GE designs can start without an auxiliary power unit (APU), using the battery alone. The UH-60 and AH-64 are currently equipped with Honeywell GTCP 36-150 APUs.

Using ITEP, the combat radius is projected to increase by 500 km (270 nmi). The hot and high service ceiling will be increased from 4,000 to 6,000 ft (1,200 to 1,800 m) at 95 °F (35 °C). Performance targets have been determined in part by operations in Afghanistan and Iraq, as well as growing airframe weights.

== Contenders ==
Diagram of a simplified single-spool free-turbine turboshaft engine

The major difference between the ATEC HPW3000 (T900) and the GE3000 (T901) engines is in the number of rotating compressor/turbine assemblies in the gas generator stage. The ATEC T900 is a dual-spool turboshaft, while the GE T901 is a single-spool design. In the single-spool design, the compressor is driven by a single turbine; the dual-spool design uses a separate shafts for a two-stage compressor, requiring two turbines. Both are free-turbine turboshafts, where an independent turbine is used in the exhaust stream downstream of the gas generator to extract power. Although the dual-spool design allows each compressor stage to run in their optimal ranges, it makes the machine more complex.

=== ATEC HPW3000 (T900) ===
The Advanced Turbine Engine Company (ATEC) is a 50/50 joint venture created in 2007 between Honeywell Aerospace and Pratt & Whitney Military Engines. ATEC completed a Core Engine (High Pressure system only) test in mid-2011 on the two-spool HPW3000 and completed Gas Generator (both High and Low Pressure systems) testing in January 2012. Durability testing of the first HPW3000 completed in October 2013. A second HPW3000 was tested for performance and sand ingestion during late summer 2014. In February 2017, the Army designated the HPW3000 design as the T900-HPW-900 engine.

=== General Electric GE3000 (T901) ===
Since 2010, GE has been developing and testing T901-specific technologies. The second GE3000 was tested for performance, endurance, and sand ingestion in late spring 2014.

In 2016, the Army awarded GE Aviation a 24-month contract for the T901 preliminary design review, and the prototype six month testing was completed in October 2017. The GE3000 engine was officially designated as the T901-GE-900 engine in January 2017.

== See also ==
- Adaptive Versatile Engine Technology (ADVENT)
- List of aircraft engines
