= ATEC T900 =

American turboshaft engine

T900
- Type: Turboshaft
- National origin: United States
- Manufacturer: Advanced Turbine Engine Company
- First run: 2013

The ATEC T900 (HPW3000) was an American turboshaft engine in the 3,000 shp (2,200 kW) class under development for the United States Army's Improved Turbine Engine Program (ITEP). The ITEP plans to re-engine over 1,300 Sikorsky UH-60 Black Hawk and more than 600 Boeing AH-64 Apache, and to power the Future Attack Reconnaissance Aircraft, beginning after 2025. The T900 was developed by the Advanced Turbine Engine Company (ATEC), a joint venture between Honeywell Aerospace and Pratt & Whitney. In February 2019, the US Army selected the GE T901 as the winner of the program.

== Development ==
The T900 is ATEC's dual-spool engine intended to replace the U.S. Army's existing engines for its Black Hawk and Apache helicopter fleet. Originally called the HPW3000, the Army designated it as the T900 engine in February 2017. In August 2016, the Army awarded ATEC a $154 million, two-year preliminary design review contract to further support development of the replacement engine.

ATEC completed a core engine (high pressure system only) test in mid-2011 on the two-spool HPW3000 and completed gas generator (both high and low pressure systems) testing in January 2012. Durability testing of the first HPW3000 completed in October 2013. A second HPW3000 was tested for performance and sand ingestion during late summer 2014. In February 2017, the Army designated the HPW3000 design as the T900-HPW-900 engine.

On 1 February 2019, the US Army selected the General Electric T901 as the winner of the ITEP program, awarding the Engineering and Manufacturing Development (EMD) contract for $517 million. Later that same month, ATEC protested the selection of the GE T901 over its T900 in a filing with the Government Accountability Office (GAO). The GAO denied the protest in a filing posted on May 30, 2019.

== Design ==
The T900 was designed so the Army can install it without having to adjust the engine compartment.

A dual-spool engine has potential to increase an engine's pressure-to-power ratio. ITEP calls for the engine to be 50 percent more powerful and 25 percent more fuel efficient while lowering maintenance costs. The engine's increased power is designed to allow Black Hawk and Apache helicopters to fly higher and longer with more soldiers or payload in hotter climates.

== Specifications (T900-HPW-900) ==
==== General characteristics ====
- Type: Turboshaft engine
- Length:
- Diameter:
- Dry weight:

==== Components ====
- Compressor:

==== Performance ====
- Maximum power output: About 3,000 hp (2,200 kW)

== See also ==
- Avco/Pratt & Whitney T800

Comparable engines

- General Electric T901

Related lists

- List of aircraft engines
