= Avco/Pratt & Whitney T800 =

Engine for helicopters

APW T800
- Type: Turboshaft
- National origin: United States
- Manufacturer: Avco Lycoming/Pratt & Whitney
- Major applications: Boeing-Sikorsky RAH-66 Comanche (intended)

The Avco/Pratt & Whitney T800 (company designation APW34) was a turboshaft engine for rotary wing applications, and was produced by Avco/Pratt & Whitney (APW), a joint venture between Avco Lycoming and Pratt & Whitney. The engine was developed for the United States Army's LHX armed reconnaissance helicopter competition to develop the Boeing-Sikorsky RAH-66 Comanche, but lost to the competing LHTEC T800 in 1988.

== See also ==
- ATEC T900

Comparable engines

- LHTEC T800
- Pratt & Whitney Canada PT6B/C
