= General Electric T700 =

Family of turboshaft and turboprop engines

T700 / CT7
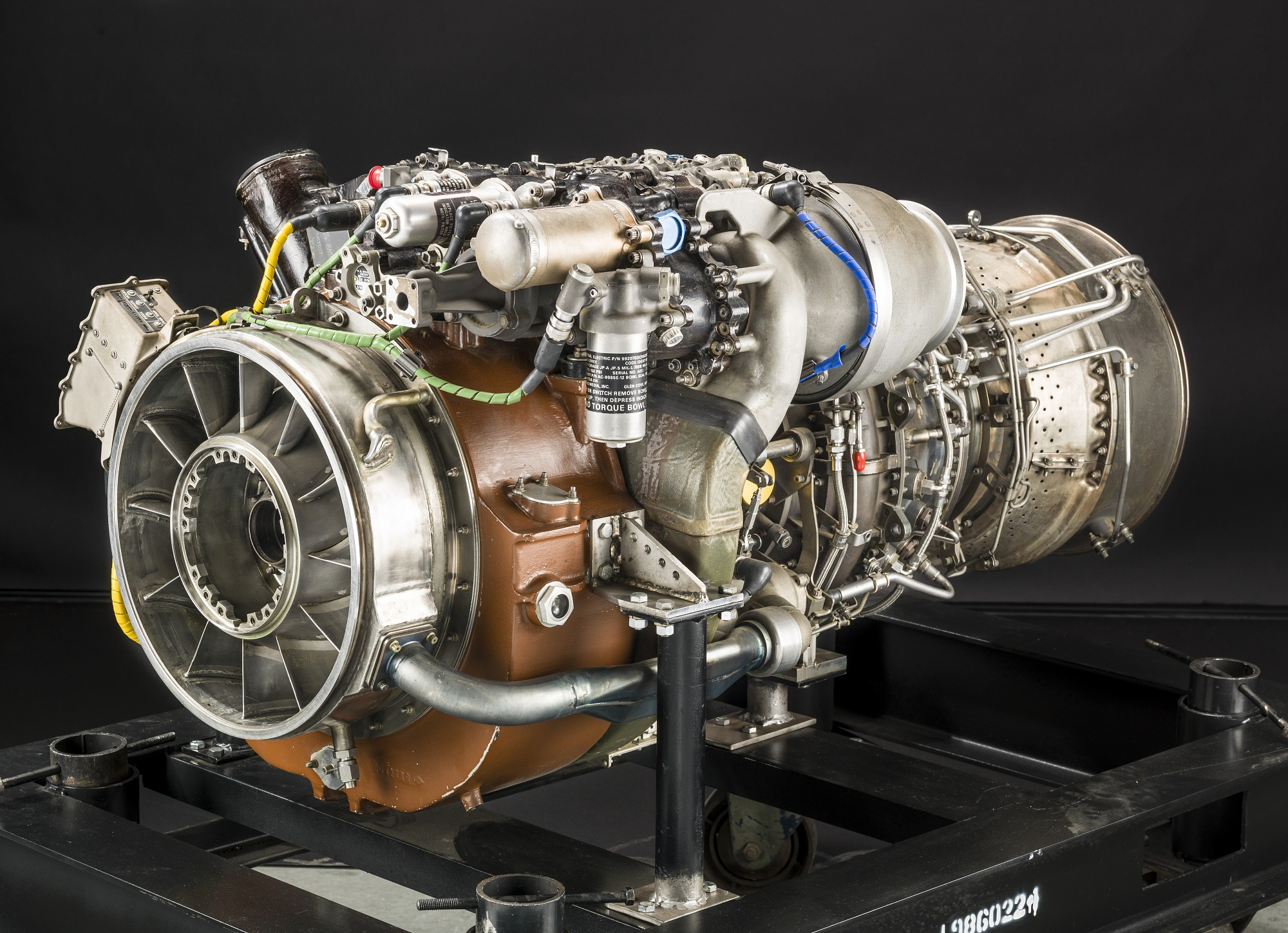
- An experimental XT700-GE-700 assembly preserved at the National Air and Space Museum
- Type: Turboshaft
- National origin: United States
- Manufacturer: GE Aviation
- First run: 1973
- Major applications: Bell AH-1W SuperCobra; Bell AH-1Z Viper; Bell UH-1Y Venom; Boeing AH-64 Apache; CASA/IPTN CN-235; KAI KUH-1 Surion; Saab 340; Sikorsky UH-60 Black Hawk; Sikorsky SH-60 Seahawk
- Number built: Over 20,000
- Developed into: General Electric T901

The General Electric T700 and CT7 are a family of turboshaft and turboprop engines in the 1,500–3,000 shp (1,100–2,200 kW) class.

== Design and development ==
In 1967, General Electric began work on a new turboshaft engine demonstrator designated the "GE12" in response to US Army interest in a next-generation utility helicopter. The GE12 was designed and conceived by GE's Art Adamson and Art Adinolfi. In 1967, both GE and Pratt & Whitney were awarded contracts to work parallel with each other to design, fabricate, and test the technology. The Army effort led, in the 1970s, to development of the Sikorsky S-70 Black Hawk, powered by twin GE "T700" turboshafts, the production descendant of the GE12.

The T700 was initially bench-tested in 1973, passed military qualification in 1976, and went into production in 1978. The initial "T700-GE-700" is an ungeared free-turbine turboshaft, with a five-stage axial / one-stage centrifugal mixed-flow compressor, featuring one-piece "blisk" axial stages, with the inlet guide vanes and first two stator stages variable; an annular combustion chamber with central fuel injection to improve combustion and reduce smoke; a two-stage compressor turbine; and a two-stage free power turbine with tip-shrouded blades. The engine is designed for high reliability, featuring an inlet particle separator designed to spin out dirt, sand, and dust. The T700-GE-700 is rated at 1,622 shp (1,210 kW) intermediate power.

The T700-GE-700 was followed by improved and uprated Army engine variants for the UH-60 Black Hawk and the AH-64 Apache helicopters, as well as marinized naval engine variants for the SH-60 Seahawk derivative of the Black Hawk, the SH-2G Seasprite, and the Bell AH-1W Supercobra. T700s are also used on Italian and commercial variants of the AgustaWestland EH101/AW101 helicopter, and Italian variants of the NHIndustries NH90 helicopter. These are all twin-engine machines, except for the three-engined EH101.

The commercial version of the T700 is the "CT7", with the engine used on the Bell 214ST (an enlarged version of the Huey), commercial Black Hawks, and the Sikorsky S-92 derivative of the Black Hawk, all of which are twin-engine helicopters.

The CT7 turboprop variants use the same core as the turboshaft variants, with a propeller gearbox fitted forward of the core. CT7 turboprops are used on variants of the Swedish Saab 340 airliner, the Indonesian-Spanish Airtech CN-235 cargolifter, and the Czech Let L-610G airliner, all twin-turboprop aircraft. The baseline CT7-5A provides 1,735 shp (1,294 kW) on takeoff.

In the late 1980s, GE also proposed a much larger turboprop, the T407/GLC38, with a five-stage axial/one-stage centrifugal mixed-flow compressor, an annular combustor with 15 burners; a two-stage compressor turbine, a three-stage power turbine, and max takeoff power of 6,000 shp (4,475 kW).

The YT706 engine is based on the CT7-8A engine. Compared with the H-60's primary T700 engine, the T706 has a larger compressor, hot section improvements, and full authority digital engine control. The T706 is rated at 2,600 shp (1,939 kW) and increases the hot-and-high mission capability of the U.S. Army's MH-60M Black Hawk for Special Operations applications.

== Variants ==
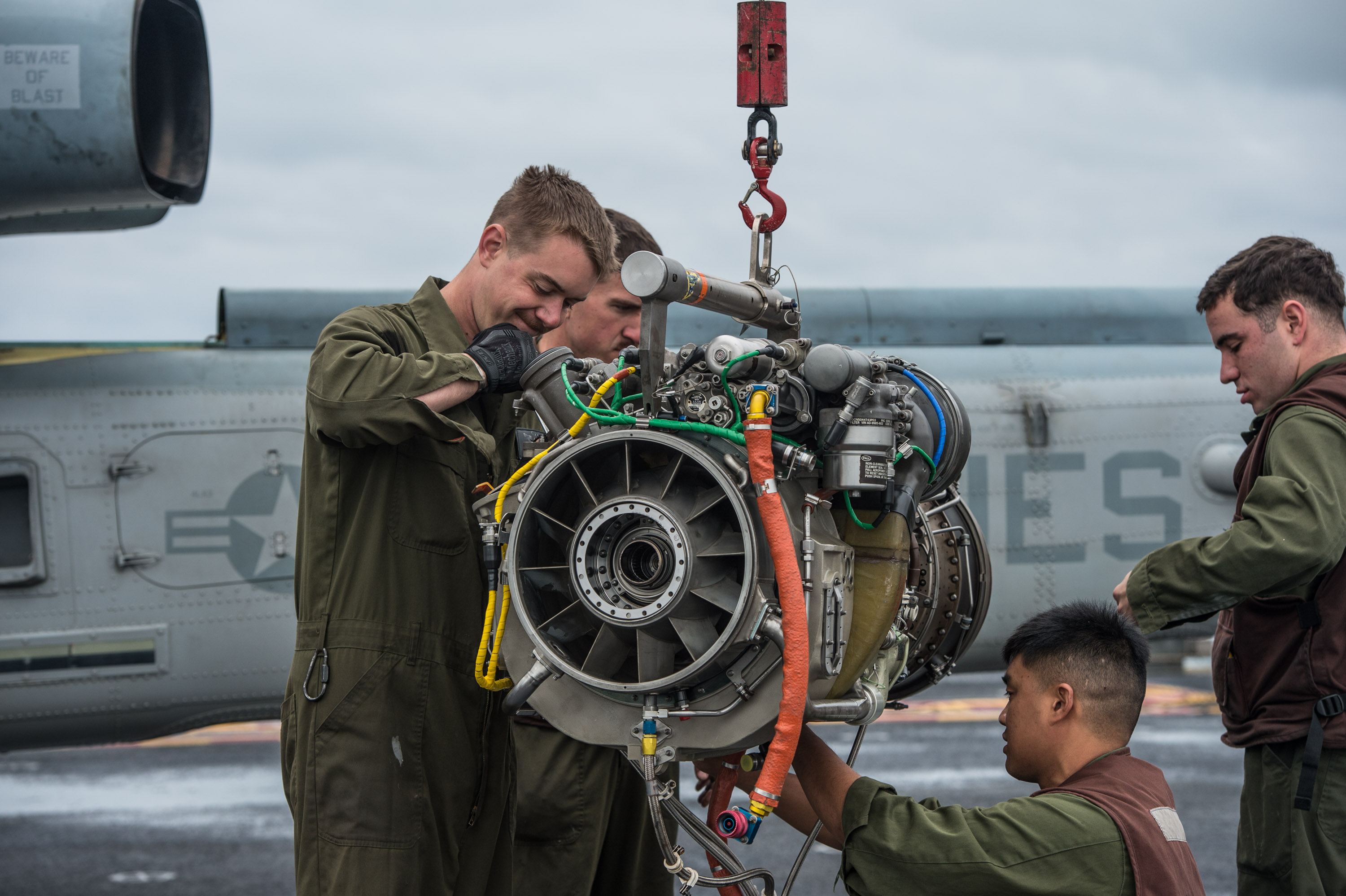
US Marines perform maintenance on the T700-GE-401C from a Bell UH-1Y helicopter

T700: Military turboshaft engine.

- YT700: Prototype version.
- T700-GE-700: Initial T700 variant.
- T700-GE-701: The improved T700-GE-701A, -701B, -701C,-701D versions have also been developed from the original -700.
- T700-GE-401: Navalised version for SH-60 Seahawk helicopters.
- T700-GE-401C: Universal application version of the -401.
- T700-GE-701C: Universal application version of the -701.
- T700-TEI-701D: Licensed produced version of Tusaş Engine Industries of Turkey. Developed for use in the Sikorsky/Turkish Aerospace Industries T-70 utility helicopter.
- T700-701K: First rear-drive version of the T700 family, a product from the joint development with Samsung Techwin (later became Hanwha Aerospace). Powering the KAI KUH-1 Surion with Hanwha's licensed production.

CT7 turboshaft: Commercial version of T700.

- CT7-2A: Basic model
- CT7-2D: Higher flow compressor and surface coatings to improve resistance to wear and corrosion
- CT7-2D1: Similar to the CT7-2D but uses a CT7-6 type hot section
- CT7-2E1: Leonardo Helicopters AW189
- CT7-6/-6A: The CT7-6/-6A turboshaft engines are upgraded commercial variants of the successful T700/CT7 engine family. The turboshaft engine powers the entire development fleet of AgustaWestland AW101 helicopters with thousands of flight hours of operation.
- CT7-8: The CT7-8 is a family of powerful engines in the 2,500 to 3,000 shp class. They are more powerful and more efficient versions of its predecessors.
- CT7-8A: A version of the CT7-8 family used to power older Sikorsky S-92/H-92 helicopters.
- CT7-8A1: A more fuel efficient version of the CT7-8A. It is used to power newer Sikorsky S-92/H-92 helicopters. The CT7-8A1 produces 2,520 shp.
- CT7-8A5
- CT7-8A7: Developed by GE as an uprated, more efficient and more reliable version of the CT7-8A1 engine for the Royal Canadian Air Force's Sikorsky CH-148 Cyclone helicopters. It is the most modern version of the CT7/T700 engine family. The CT7-8A7 produces 3,000 shp.
- CT7-8B
- CT7-8B5
- CT7-8E
- CT7-8E5
- CT7-8E6
- CT7-8F
- CT7-8F5

CT7 turboprop: Turboprop version of CT7.

- CT7-3: Compact shortened and lightened version.
- CT7-5A2
- CT7-5A3
- CT7-7A
- CT7-7A1
- CT7-9B
- CT7-9B1
- CT7-9B2
- CT7-9C
- CT7-9C3
- CT7-9D
- CT7-9D2

== Applications ==
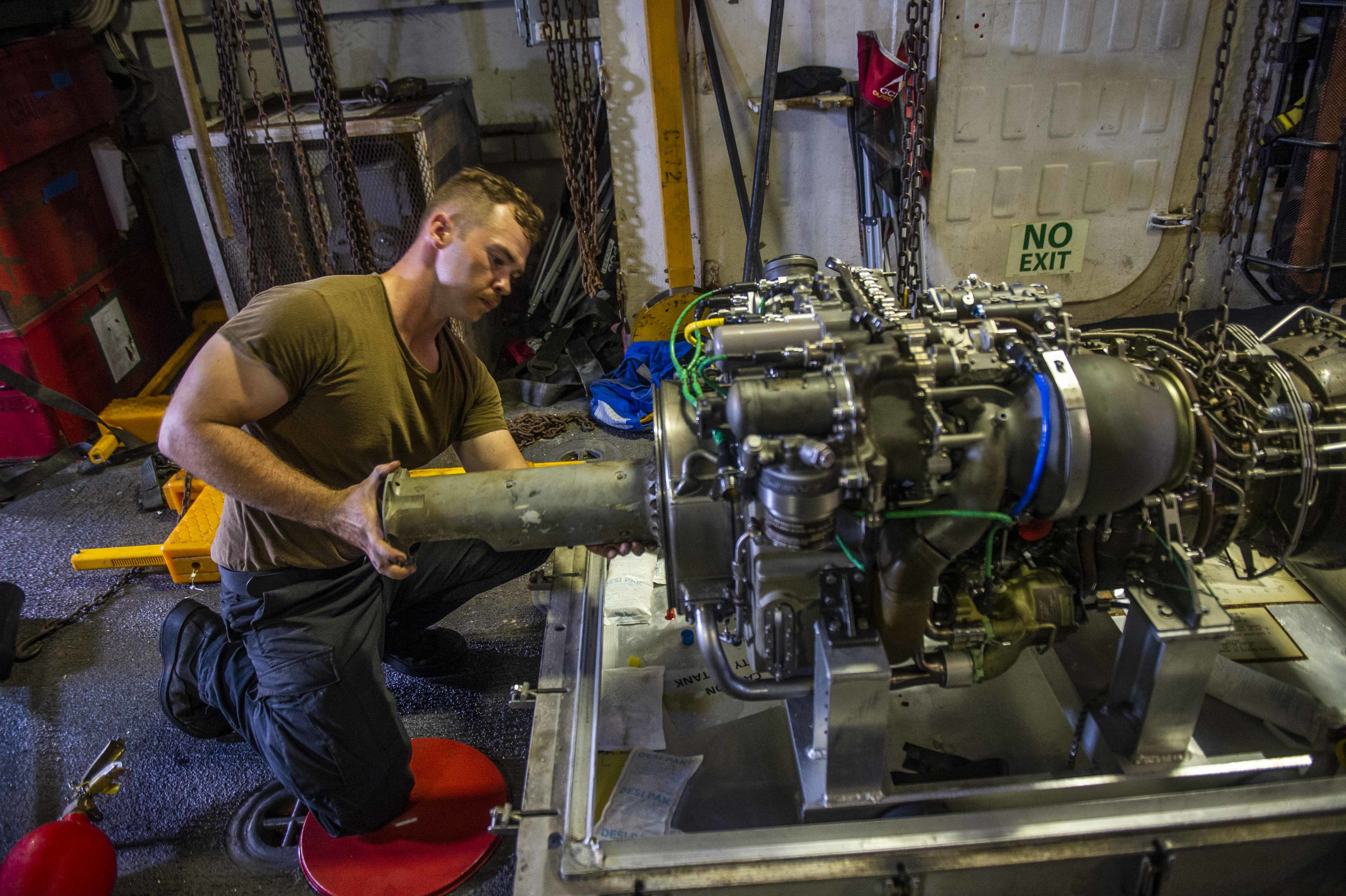
A U.S. Navy Sailor performing maintenance on a T700 engine from a MH-60R Sea Hawk.

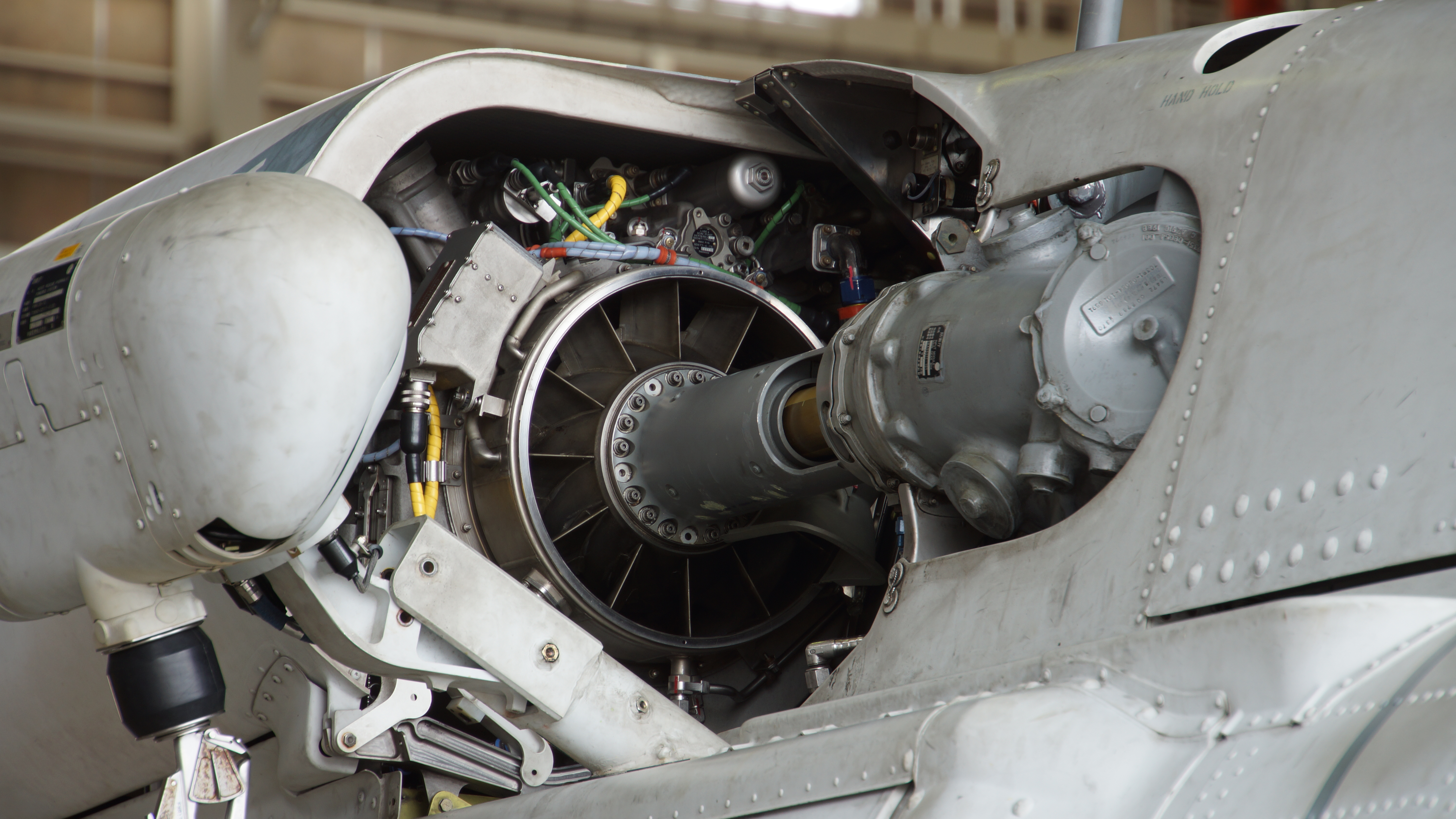
An T700-IHI-401C2 being mounted on a Japanese SH-60K

=== T700/CT7 turboshaft ===
- AgustaWestland AW101
  - AgustaWestland CH-149 Cormorant
  - Lockheed Martin VH-71 Kestrel
- AgustaWestland AW149
- AgustaWestland AW189
- Bell 214ST
- Bell 525
- Bell AH-1W SuperCobra
- Bell AH-1Z Viper
- Bell UH-1Y Venom
- Boeing AH-64 Apache
- KAI KUH-1 Surion
- Kaman SH-2G Super Seasprite
- Kamov Ka-64 Sky Horse
- Leonardo Helicopters AW249
- NHIndustries NH90
- Sikorsky S-70/H-60 series
  - Mitsubishi H-60
  - Piasecki X-49
  - Sikorsky HH-60 Jayhawk
  - Sikorsky HH-60 Pave Hawk
  - Sikorsky SH-60 Seahawk
  - Sikorsky UH-60 Black Hawk
- Sikorsky S-92
  - Sikorsky CH-148 Cyclone

=== YT706 turboshaft ===
- Sikorsky MH-60M Black Hawk
- Sikorsky S-97 Raider

=== CT7 turboprop ===
- CASA/IPTN CN-235
- Let L-610G
- Saab 340
- Sukhoi Su-80

== Specifications (T700) ==
==== General characteristics ====
- Type: Turboshaft engine
- Length: 47 in (1,200 mm) (T700-GE-700/701 series); 48.2 in (1,220 mm) (T700/T6A)
- Diameter: 25 to 26 in (640 to 660 mm) (T700/T6E)
- Dry weight:
  - 400 lb (180 kg) (YT700-GE-700)
  - 437 lb (198 kg) (T700-GE-700)
  - 537 lb (244 kg) (T700/T6E)

==== Components ====
- Compressor: 6 stage-5 stage axial, 1 stage centrifugal.
- Combustors: Annular
- Turbine: 2 stage gas generator and 2 stage power turbine
- Fuel type: JP-4 or JP-5 (YT700-GE-700)
- Oil system: Self contained, pressurized, recirculating dry sump

==== Performance ====
- Maximum power output:
  - YT700-GE-700: 1,536 shp (1,145 kW)
  - T700-GE-700: 1,622 shp (1,210 kW)
  - T700/T6E: 2,380 shp (1,775 kW)
  - YT706-GE-700: 2,638 shp (1,967 kW)
- Overall pressure ratio: 17:1
- Specific fuel consumption: 0.433 lb/(hp⋅h) (263 g/kWh) (T700/T6E) to 0.465 lb/(hp⋅h) (283 g/kWh) (T700-GE-701A)
- Power-to-weight ratio:
  - 3.84 shp/lb (6.31 kW/kg) (YT700-GE-700)
  - 3.71 shp/lb (6.10 kW/kg) (T700-GE-700)
  - 4.48 shp/lb (7.37 kW/kg) (T700/T6E)

== See also ==
- Advanced Affordable Turbine Engine, a program to develop a replacement for the T700 engine

Related development

- General Electric T901

Related lists

- List of aircraft engines
