= LHTEC T800 =

Turboshaft engine for rotary wing

T800 / CTS800
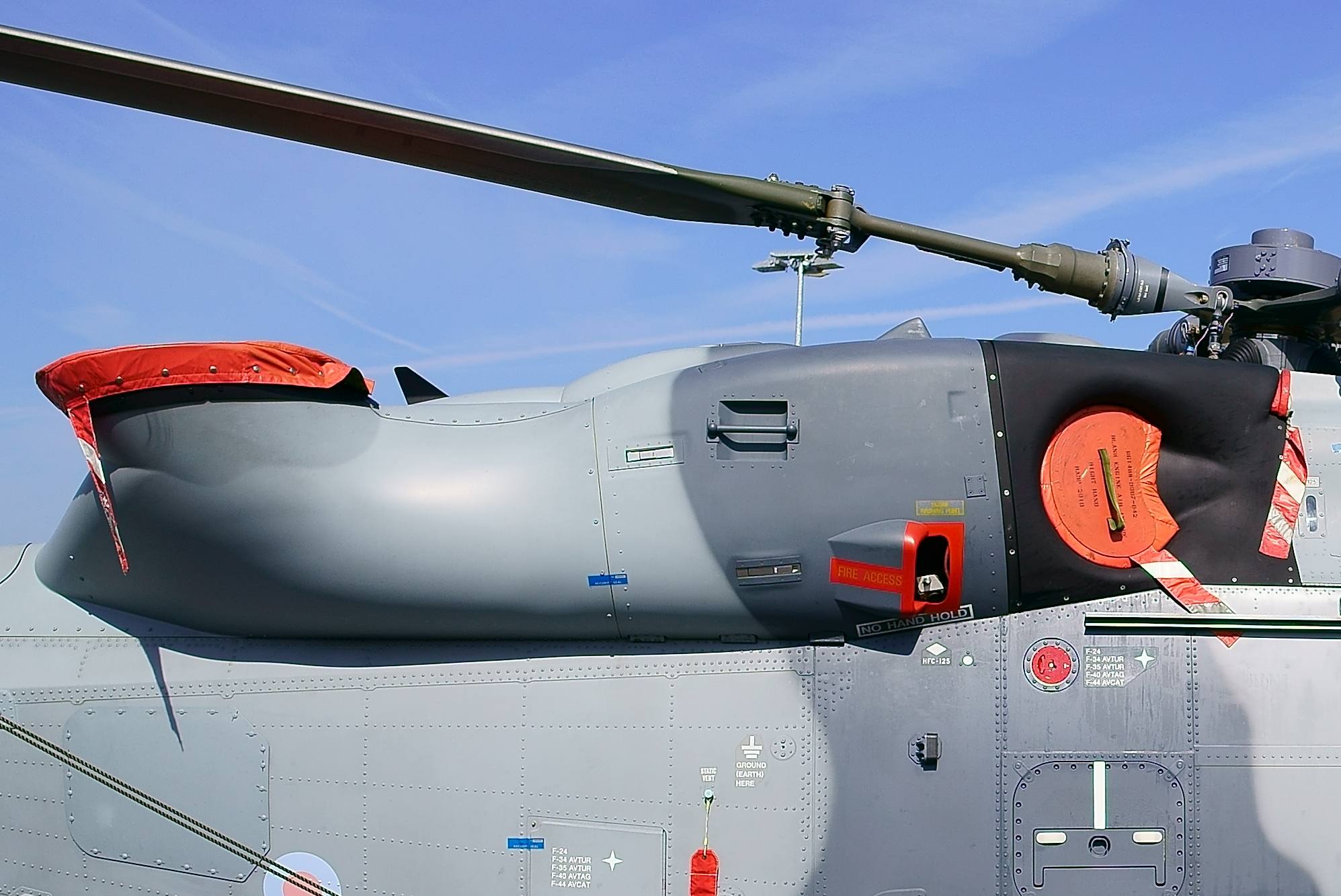
- AgustaWestland AW159 Wildcat installation
- Type: Turboshaft
- National origin: United States
- Manufacturer: LHTEC
- Major applications: AgustaWestland AW159; Boeing-Sikorsky RAH-66 Comanche; TAI/AgustaWestland T129 ATAK

The LHTEC T800 is a turboshaft engine for rotary wing applications. It is produced by the LHTEC (Light Helicopter Turbine Engine Company), a joint venture between Rolls-Royce and Honeywell. The commercial and export version is the CTS800. The engine was primarily developed for the United States Army's cancelled RAH-66 Comanche armed reconnaissance helicopter, but has found use in other applications.

== Design and development ==
The engine was originally developed for the United States Army's LHX armed reconnaissance helicopter competition, competing against the Avco/Pratt & Whitney T800. The LHTEC T800 was selected to power the LHX in 1988. The Boeing-Sikorsky team was selected to build the RAH-66 Comanche in 1991. A pair of T800-powered RAH-66 prototypes were constructed and underwent flight testing between 1996 and 2004. The LHX program was canceled in 2004, primarily due to cost overruns during its lengthy development, and the US Army's changing requirements.

== Applications ==
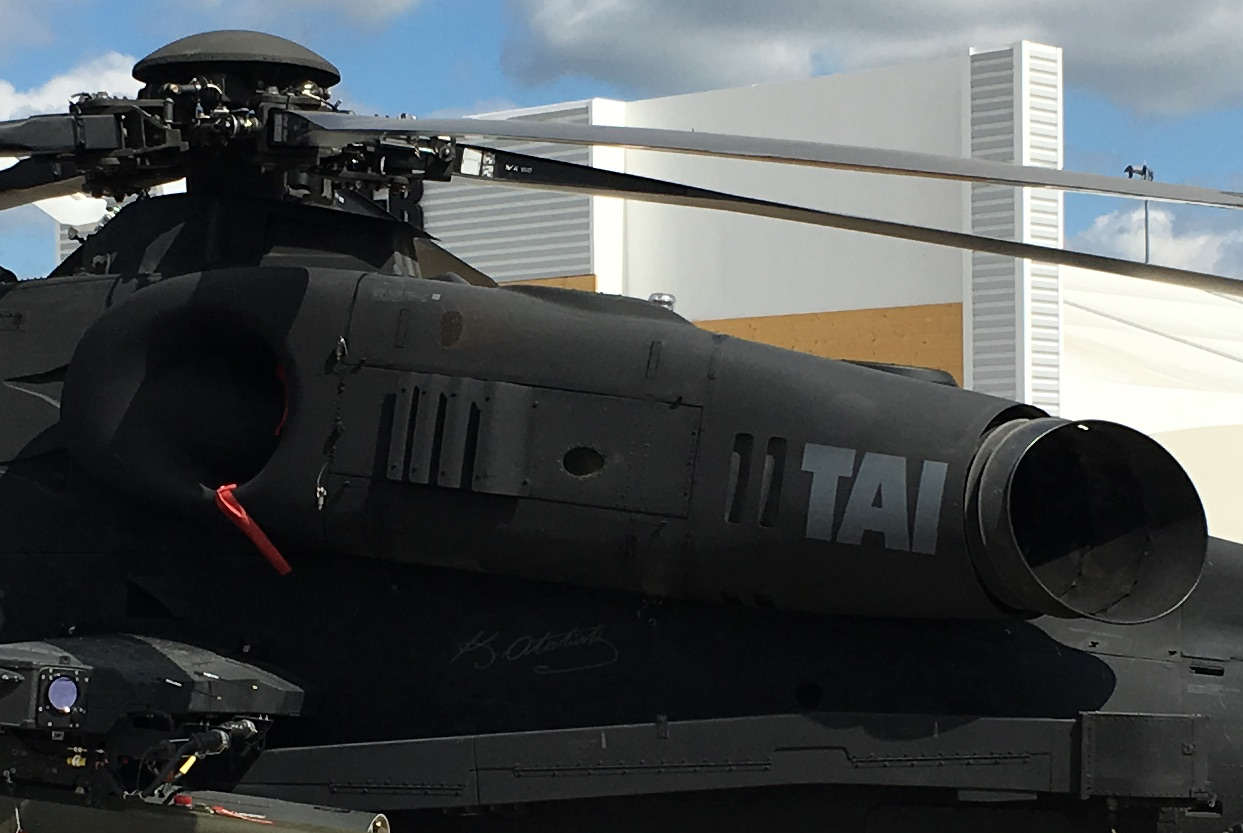
TAI/AgustaWestland T129 installation

- AgustaWestland Super Lynx 300 (CTS800-4N)
- AgustaWestland AW159 Wildcat (CTS800-4N)
- Ayres LM200 Loadmaster (LHTEC CTP800-4T) (aircraft not built)
- Boeing-Sikorsky RAH-66 Comanche (canceled)
- ShinMaywa US-2 (CTS800-4K) - boundary layer compressor drive
- Sikorsky X2 (T800-LHT-801)
- TAI/AgustaWestland T129 ATAK (CTS800-4A)
- TAI T625

== Specifications (T800-LHT-801) ==
Data from

==== General characteristics ====
- Type: turboshaft
- Length: 31.5 inches (0.80 m)
- Diameter:
- Dry weight: 315 pounds (143 kg)

==== Components ====
- Compressor: Single-stage low-pressure centrifugal, single-stage high-pressure centrifugal
- Turbine: Single-stage low-pressure, single-stage high pressure, two-stage power turbine

==== Performance ====
- Maximum power output: 1,563 shp (1,166 kW)
- Specific fuel consumption: ~0.459 lb/(hp⋅h) (279 g/kWh)

== See also ==
Comparable engines

- Avco/Pratt & Whitney T800
- HAL HTSE-1200
- MTR MTR390
- Pratt & Whitney Canada PT6B/C
- Safran Ardiden
- Safran Arrano
- Klimov VK-2500
- TEI TS1400
