= Bell V-247 Vigilant =

Unmanned military tiltrotor concept

V-247 Vigilant

General information
- Type: Tiltrotor multirole UAV
- National origin: United States
- Manufacturer: Bell Helicopter
- Status: Concept

The Bell V-247 Vigilant is a concept by Bell Helicopter to develop a large tiltrotor unmanned aerial vehicle.

== Development ==
Bell created the V-247 to meet emerging U.S. military needs for a runway-independent Group 4 or 5 UAV to provide persistent support to ground forces, while requiring less space to store and transport. Group 4 UAVs weigh more than 1,320 lb (600 kg) and fly below 18,000 ft (5,500 m). Group 5 UAVs weigh the same but fly above 18,000 ft, such as the MQ-9 Reaper, RQ-4 Global Hawk, and MQ-4C Triton. It is named the V-247 because it is planned that a two-aircraft team can provide 24/7 intelligence, surveillance and reconnaissance (ISR) over a given area.

The design uses tiltrotors to take off vertically and transition to high-speed forward flight, enabling performance unachievable with just rotorcraft or fixed-wing aircraft. It leverages technologies which Bell previously utilized for the V-22 Osprey and V-280 Valor for the Future Vertical Lift program, and the HV-911 Eagle Eye, another smaller unmanned tiltrotor dropped in 2008. The aircraft is capable of performing a variety of missions including electronic warfare, persistent fire support, airborne early warning (AEW), and resupply.

Bell is particularly interested in the U.S. Marine Corps' Marine Air Ground Task Force – Unmanned Expeditionary Capabilities (MUX) concept to perform the tasks of MQ-1 Predator and Reaper aircraft while operating from amphibious assault ships to complement and escort the MV-22. The U.S. Army is also interested in runway-independent unmanned aircraft, and the Vigilant could be incorporated into manned-unmanned teaming (MUM-T) arrangements where helicopter pilots have the ability to control nearby drones from the cockpit using a tactical common data-link. A 1/8-scale model was unveiled in September 2016. The system could be ready for production by 2023.

While Bell is funding the V-247 through its preliminary design phase, the company is searching for a customer, likely the USMC, to fund the follow-on design effort to incorporate specific requirements into the design.

== Design ==
The V-247 Vigilant is designed to weigh 16,000 lb (7,300 kg) empty and carry 13,000 lb (5,900 kg) of fuel, weapons, and sensors for a maximum gross weight of 29,000 lb (13,000 kg), roughly three times the maximum takeoff weight of the MQ-9. The V-22 and V-280 use two engines located within the tiltrotor pylons. The V-247 will have a single engine housed in the fuselage generating 5,000-6,000 shp (3,670-4,410 kW), about as much as the V-22's engines. The wingspan is 65 ft (20 m), just 1 ft (30 cm) shorter than the Reaper's, with 30 ft (9.1 m)-diameter tilting rotors, 8 ft (2.4 m) smaller in diameter than the V-22's.

Like the V-280, it has a V-shaped tail and one long wing piece mated to the top of the fuselage and retractable tricycle landing gear. To enable size compatibility with U.S. Navy Arleigh Burke-class guided missile destroyers, the wing and rotors swivel along the 37 ft (11 m)-long fuselage to have the same footprint as the UH-1Y Venom helicopter. Two folded up V-247s can fit inside one C-17 Globemaster III transport aircraft. The aircraft aims to have a cruise speed of 250 knots (290 mph; 460 km/h), a top speed of 300 knots (350 mph; 560 km/h), and a service ceiling of 25,000 ft (7,600 m), with a combat radius of 450 nautical miles (520 mi; 830 km) and time-on-station of 11–15 hours, while carrying a 600 lb (270 kg) payload. Range is 1,400 nmi (1,600 mi; 2,600 km) for 17 hours on internal fuel. It has the capability for aerial refueling.

The aircraft can support an internal mission payload of 2,000 lb (910 kg) and can sling-load 9,000 lb (4,100 kg). The Vigilant is equipped with three internal payload bays, a centerline payload, and the capability to house up to two underwing pylons per side for various payloads including additional fuel, radar systems, LiDAR modules, sonobuoys, the Mark 50 torpedo, AGM-114 Hellfire, and Joint Air-to-Ground Missile (JAGM).

== See also ==
Related development

- Bell Eagle Eye
- Bell V-280 Valor
