= A160 =

A160 may refer to:

- Mercedes-Benz A-Class, specifically the A160 compact car
- Boeing A160 Hummingbird, an Unmanned Aerial Vehicle
