= Future Vertical Lift =

Planned family of US military helicopters

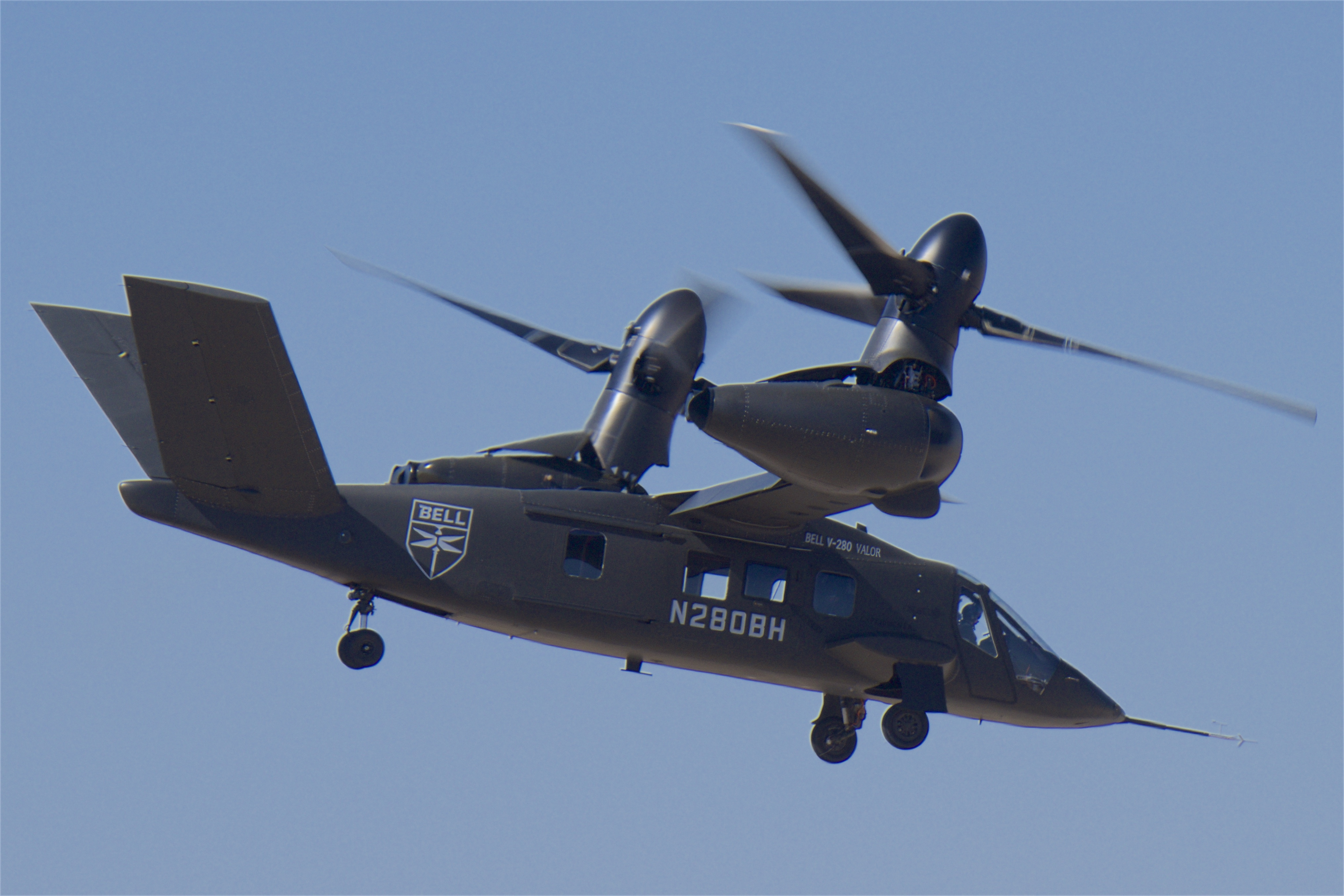
- The Bell MV-75, an FVL concept developed as a Joint Multi-Role Technology Demonstrator

General information
- Issued by: United States Department of Defense

History
- Related: Future Attack Reconnaissance Aircraft (FARA) – cancelled Future Long-Range Assault Aircraft (FLRAA) – in development
- Predecessors: Joint Multi-Role (JMR)

Future Vertical Lift (FVL) is a plan to develop a family of military helicopters for the United States Armed Forces. Five sizes of aircraft are to be developed, sharing common hardware such as sensors, avionics, engines, and countermeasures. Established as an initiative in 2009 and cemented by the release of a strategic plan two years later, FVL is meant to develop replacements for the Army's UH-60 Black Hawk, AH-64 Apache, CH-47 Chinook, and OH-58 Kiowa helicopters.

== Overview ==
By the late 2000s, U.S. Army rotorcraft were wearing out because the American wars in Afghanistan and Iraq were forcing them to fly five times more often than in peacetime. Manufacturers were remanufacturing and upgrading existing aircraft types instead of creating new ones. In 2009, the U.S. defense secretary launched the Future Vertical Lift initiative to focus Defense Department vertical-lift capabilities and technology development and retain long-term engineering capabilities. In October 2011, the deputy defense secretary issued the FVL Strategic Plan to outline a joint, pan-military approach for next-generation vertical-lift aircraft. It indicates 80 percent of decision points for DoD rotorcraft to extend the life, retire, or replace by about 2020. It is meant to shape the development of vertical-lift aviation operations for 25 to 40 years, replace most Army helicopters, and affect the military's vertical-lift efforts for more than half a century.

The FVL concept aims to create rotorcraft using new technology, materials, and designs that are quicker, have longer range and higher payload capacity, are more reliable, easier to maintain and operate, have lower operating costs, and can reduce logistical footprints. The Joint Multi-Role (JMR) phases will provide technology demonstrations. JMR-TD will develop the aerial platform; JMR Phase I will develop the air vehicle; JMR Phase II will develop mission systems. As of 2013, the Army planned to acquire as many as 4,000 aircraft from the FVL program. The Army started an FVL engine program in 2016.

The United States Navy is working with the Army on the effort, so a derivative of FVL may be used in the Navy's MH-XX program to replace the service's MH-60S/R helicopters.

=== Configurations ===
Three sizes were planned in 2009, then four and five (which may or may not be of the same design) are envisioned to replace 25 rotorcraft types:

- JMR-Light: Scout helicopter to replace the OH-58 Kiowa. Implemented as the Future Attack Reconnaissance Aircraft (FARA) program in 2018. In February 2024, the U.S. Army cancelled the FARA program because it had been rendered unnecessary by developments in modern warfare.
- JMR-Medium-Light
- JMR-Medium: Utility version to replace the UH-60 Black Hawk; introduction planned for 2030. The Bell V-280 Valor was awarded a contract for the Future Long-Range Assault Aircraft program in December 2022.
- JMR-Heavy: Cargo version to replace the CH-47 Chinook; introduction planned for 2035, although Boeing expects 2060.
- JMR-Ultra: New ultra-sized version for vertical lift aircraft with performance similar to fixed-wing tactical transport aircraft, such as the C-130J Super Hercules and the Airbus A400M Atlas; introduction was planned for 2025 in 2019.

According to the U.S. House Armed Services Committee, three different configurations of JMR aircraft – a conventional helicopter, a large-wing slowed rotor compound helicopter, and a tiltrotor – were being studied as of April 2013.

=== Design requirements ===
In March 2013, the Army asked industry to submit proposals for an Alternative Engine Conceptual Design and Analysis, intended to enable FVL aircraft to hover, speed, range, payload, and fuel efficiency characteristics "beyond any current rotorcraft"—perhaps to hover and maneuver at 10,000 feet (3,000 m) and cruise at 30,000 feet (9,100 m). The engine would need advanced engine/power system configurations that enable longer time on station, increased mission radius, and quieter operation for power outputs from 40 shp (30 kW) to 10,000 shp (7,500 kW). The RFI said one to four companies might be awarded a contract to fill in 18 months.

In 2014, the notional concept for a new aircraft called for speeds of 230 kn (260 mph; 430 km/h), carry up to 12 troops, operate in "high-hot" conditions at altitudes of 6,000 ft (1,800 m) and temperatures of 95 °F (35 °C), and have a combat radius of 263 mi (424 km) with an overall unrefueled range of 527 mi (848 km). Mission sets were to include cargo transport, utility, armed scout, attack, humanitarian assistance, medical evacuation, anti-submarine warfare, anti-surface warfare, land/sea search and rescue, special warfare support, vertical replenishment, airborne mine countermeasures, and others. The FVL family of aircraft was be required to have either optionally piloted or autonomous flight capabilities.

Also in 2014, Lockheed Martin was developing a single "common missions system" that could save money by eliminating the need to train maintenance staff, trainers, and personnel in multiple systems. One component is a helmet, derived from the one used on the F-35 Lightning II, to use distributed aperture technology and integrated sensors to enable pilots to view "through" the aircraft.

== JMR competitors ==
=== Bell ===
Bell Helicopter proposed a third-generation tiltrotor design for the FVL program, which was ultimately selected for the FLRAA contract award. Bell sought partners for financial and technological support, although the company did not require assistance. In April 2013, Bell revealed its tiltrotor design, named the Bell V-280 Valor. It is designed to have a cruise speed of 280 knots (320 mph; 520 km/h), range of 2,100 nautical miles (2,400 mi; 3,900 km), and a combat range of 500 to 800 nmi (580–920 mi; 930–1,480 km).

It features a V-tail, a large cell carbon core wing with a composite fuselage, triple redundant fly-by-wire flight control system, retractable landing gear, and two six-foot-wide (1.8 m) side doors for ease of access. The V-280 is unusual in that only the rotor system tilts, but not the engines. The planned demonstrator is medium-size and carries four crew members and 14 troops. It is to be built at 92 percent scale or larger. Bell says they are investing four times the government's amount.

Bell has suggested that their design could be ready for other services' helicopter replacement programs before the Army is ready to award a bid. On December 5, 2022, the Army selected Bell Textron for the FLRAA contract award, with GAO overriding a program dispute from the Sikorsky-Boeing team.

=== Sikorsky/Boeing ===
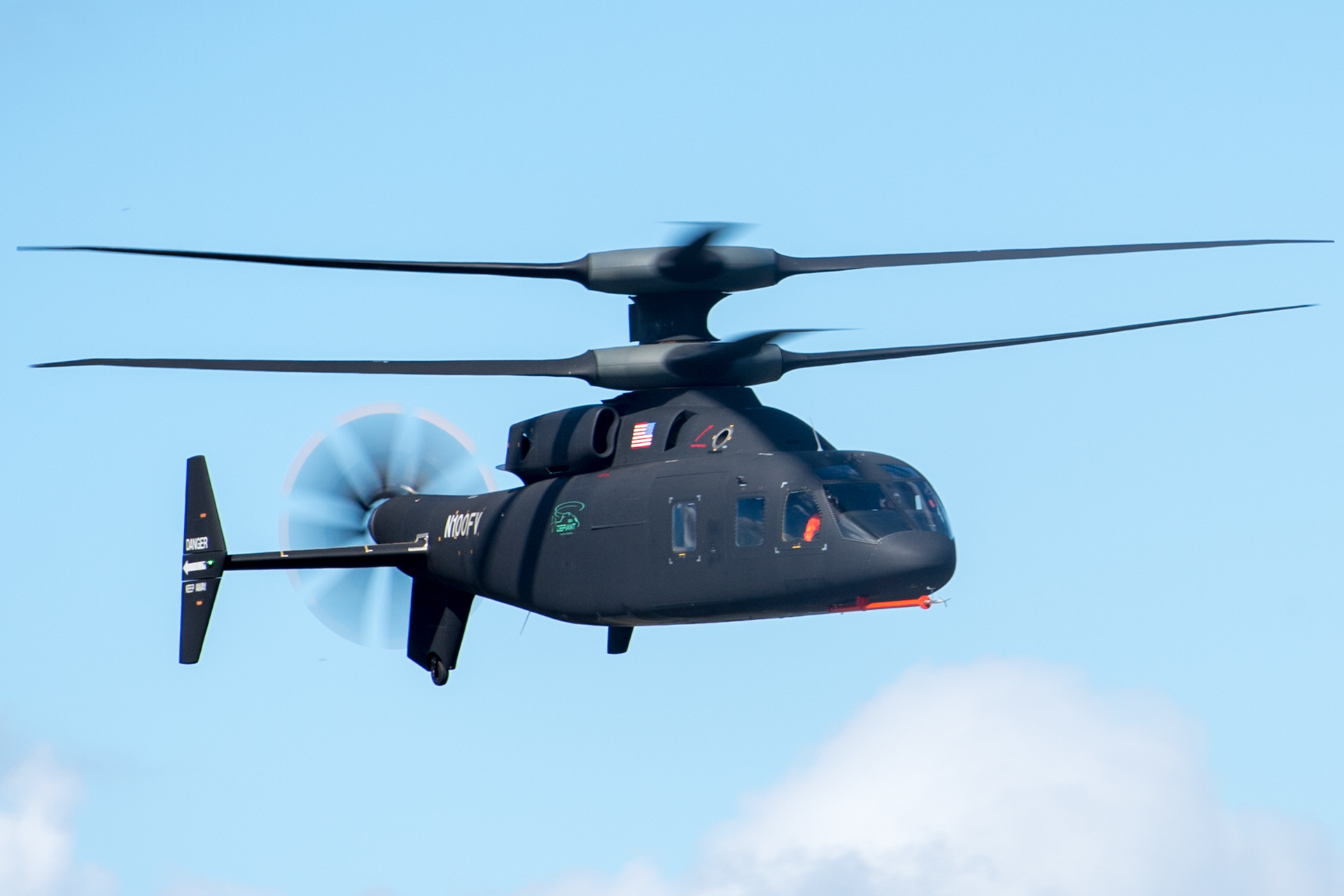
The SB-1 Defiant

The SB-1 Defiant (or "SB>1") is the Sikorsky Aircraft and Boeing entry for the program. It is a compound helicopter with rigid coaxial rotors and two Honeywell T55 engines. Its first flight took place in March 2019.

==== Defiant X variant ====
In January 2021, Sikorsky-Boeing announced the Defiant X variant, specifically designed for the Future Long-Range Assault Aircraft program. In February 2022, Sikorsky-Boeing picked Honeywell's new HTS7500 turboshaft engine, which will replace the Honeywell T55 engine that powered the SB-1 Defiant technology demonstrator platform informing the Defiant X offering. The HTS7500 is rated at 7,500 horsepower and is 42% more powerful with an 18% reduction in specific fuel consumption and weighs less than the T55 engine.

=== Former competitors ===
AVX

AVX Aircraft proposed an aircraft with their coaxial rotor and twin ducted fan design that provides better steering and some additional forward power. Their JMR-TD is to be built at 75% scale. It is capable of flying at 230 kn (260 mph; 430 km/h), with 40% lift from the small forward wings and 60% from the 56-foot (17 m) rotors. Half the drag of the design comes from the fuselage and half from the rotor system, so wind tunnel tests are aiming to reduce drag by a third. The rotor system has two composite-flexbeam hubs with drag-reducing aerodynamic fairings on the blade cuffs and the mast between the hubs. The medium-sized version is proposed to weigh 27,000 lb (12,000 kg), carry four crew and 12 troops, and have a 13,000-pound (5,900 kg) external lifting capacity.

It has a six-by-six-foot (1.8 m × 1.8 m) cabin, which is twice the interior size of the UH-60 Black Hawk, and has an 8,000-pound (3,600 kg) internal lifting capacity. The aircraft can carry 12 NATO litters, have an auxiliary fuel system for self-deployment over distances, and is planned to be capable of being optionally manned. The utility and attack versions will have 90% commonality and fly at the same speed. Test aircraft will be equipped with current GE T706 engines, but AVX is looking to equip their design with the Advanced Affordable Turbine Engine with its higher 4,800 hp (3,600 kW) output. AVX has teamed with Rockwell Collins, General Electric, and BAE Systems. It features entry doors on both sides of the fuselage with a large rear ramp for easy cargo handling. Both versions have retractable landing gear, and the attack variant carries all armaments stored inside until needed to provide a clean aerodynamic design.

The company refers to the unnamed concept as an "innovative compound coaxial helicopter" capable of achieving 80 percent of the speed of the V-22 Osprey at half the cost. It will be able to hover at 6,000 feet (1,800 m) in temperatures of 95 °F (35 °C) and fly unrefueled from Travis Air Force Base in California to Hawaii, a distance of 2,100 nmi (2,400 mi; 3,900 km). AVX considers its position as a smaller company (with 25 employees, some of which worked on the V-22) to its advantage without a legacy or burden of overhead attributes like larger defense corporations; if selected to supply an aircraft, AVX will likely have a teaming arrangement with another company that can handle assembly, integration, and production support. Like Sikorsky, AVX considers coaxials as unsuitable for heavy-lift, and suggests their tiltrotor instead for Capability Set 4 (Chinook replacement).

Karem

Karem Aircraft proposed to design an optimum-speed tiltrotor (OSTR), designated the TR36TD demonstrator. It would have had twin 36-foot-diameter (11 m) variable-speed rotors powered by existing turboshaft engines. The production version of the TR36D would have had a level flight speed of 360 kn (410 mph; 670 km/h). Karem says its variable-speed OSTR configuration offers advantages in weight, drive train, and aerodynamic and propulsive efficiency. It has high speed, "robust" hover performance at altitude, higher climb rate and sustained maneuverability, and longer range than other vertical-takeoff-and-landing configurations. They also say it offers reduced complexity, inherent safety advantages, simplified maintenance, and low total ownership cost. As of 2016, Karem continues to work on versions of the TR36, intending to start testing rotors around 2018.

=== Other entries ===
EADS was planning to submit a proposal for the JMR Phase I demonstration, expected to have been based on the Eurocopter X³, but withdrew in late May 2013 because Eurocopter might have to transfer X³ intellectual property to the US, and to focus on its bids for the Armed Aerial Scout program (later cancelled). The company also said the cost of developing a high-speed rotorcraft was far greater than the $75 million funding that would have been awarded. The EADS proposal was not totally based on the X3 design, but did leverage aspects of its technology. EADS may re-submit its proposal for FVL when the Army creates specific requirements.

Piasecki Aircraft was bidding its PA61-4 Advanced Winged Compound (AWC). The full-compound version was planned to fly at 233 kn (268 mph; 432 km/h) and used their vectored-thrust ducted propeller (VTDP), flown previously on the Piasecki X-49. It propelled the aircraft and had a long-span wing for lift and anti-torque. The wing pivoted in pitch for addition flight control and to reduce rotor download in the hover. Removing the wing but retaining the VTDP produced the 180 kn (210 mph; 330 km/h) thrust compound version, which could be used for shipboard operations. Replacing the VTDP with a conventional tail rotor produced the 160 kn (180 mph; 300 km/h) version, which was slower but was lighter, cheaper, and could better handle external-lift or vertical-replenishment missions. The Piasecki entry was not selected for the Joint Multi-Role phase of the program. As of 2016, Piasecki has other funding to update the X-49, and intends to offer a winged compound helicopter design for FVL.

== Development ==
=== Joint Multi-Role ===
On 5 June 2013, Bell announced that its V-280 Valor design had been selected by the Army for the Joint Multi-Role (JMR) Technology Demonstrator (TD) phase. The Army classified the offering as a Category I proposal, meaning it is a well-conceived, scientifically or technically sound proposal pertinent to program goals and objectives with applicability to Army mission needs, offered by a responsible contractor with the competent scientific and technical staff supporting resources required to achieve results.

The Boeing-Sikorsky team, pitching the high-speed compound helicopter design based on the X2 prototype, also reported they were invited to negotiate a technology investment agreement for the JMR-TD Phase I program. JMR-TD contracts were expected to be awarded in September 2013, with flights scheduled for 2017.

AVX Aircraft also confirmed that it had been selected for the JMR Phase I as a Category I participant. Their entry is a coaxial-rotor compound helicopter with ducted fans for propulsion and small wings to offload the rotors at high speed. The company plans to build a 70% scale demonstrator using existing General Electric T700 engines.

EADS withdrew from the program before designs had been selected, and Piasecki Aircraft was not chosen to continue in the effort.

On 31 July 2013, Boeing and Sikorsky pledged they will invest more than double the amount money the government is spending on JMR if the team is chosen to build and demonstrate a rotorcraft for the program.

On 6 August 2013, Lockheed Martin said it will offer a new mission equipment package to meet the requirements for the JMR/FVL program. Lockheed Martin will incorporate future airborne capability environment software standards into the aircraft's cockpit and mission systems to use their avionics, weapons, and sensors like the F-35 helmet. Boeing and other companies are expected to offer rival sets of avionics. On 9 September 2013, Bell announced Lockheed would be teaming with them on the V-280.

On 2 October 2013, the U.S. Army awarded technology investment agreements (IIA) to AVX Aircraft, Bell Helicopters, Karem Aircraft and Sikorsky Aircraft under the Joint Multi-Role Technology Demonstrator Phase I program. There are two general types of proposals: tiltrotors with rotors that serve as both rotors and conventional propellers, and compound helicopters that use vertical rotors and separate rear-mounted propellers. AVX and Sikorsky are offering compound designs with two counter-rotating rotors to provide vertical lift. For forward movement, AVX uses two ducted fans and Sikorsky uses a single propeller on the back. Bell is offering the V-280 Valor tiltrotor. Karem Aircraft is offering a tiltrotor with optimum-speed rotors, allowing the aircraft to speed or slow the propellers depending on speed or efficiency demands. Similar technology was used on the A160 Hummingbird. JMR-TD is to develop and demonstrate an operationally representative mix of capabilities, technologies, and interfaces to investigate realistic design trades and enabling technologies.

The TIAs give the four teams nine months to complete preliminary design of their rotorcraft, which the Army will then review and authorize the construction of two competing demonstrators to fly in 2017. While there was a potential for an early downselect, the four teams are focused on the 2017 flight demonstrations. Emerging results from JMR TD Phase 1 will be used to inform the FVL effort regarding vehicle configurations, the maturity of enabling technologies, attainable performance and capabilities, and will highlight affordable technical solutions required to achieve those capabilities. Each of the four teams received $6.5 million from the Army for this phase of the program. On 21 October 2013, defense executives bidding for the program stated that the Army plans to downselect to two companies in 2014, who will then develop prototypes for flight tests in 2017. JMR-TD phase I is focused on creating a medium utility rotorcraft airframe, while phase II will develop mission systems and software although integration with airframes is not planned and thus will not be flying.

Submissions for JMR evaluations were to be entered by the four competitors by June 2014, with the Army selecting two to build demonstrators to fly between 2017 and 2019, but the Army may choose a non-JMR vehicle for FVL, and may pursue different types for different FVL classes. Commonality of systems across vehicles and across military units is desired. Specifications are for a design capable of performing both medium utility and attack missions, with a 230 kn (260 mph; 430 km/h) cruising speed, and of hovering at 6,000 ft (1,800 m) in 95 °F (35 °C) temperatures.

After the flight tests and technology development, JMR will end and a Request for Proposals (RFP) will be issued open to all companies to begin the projected $100 billion FVL effort. Demonstrators developed under JMR will be "X-planes" to demonstrate some key technologies, but they won't have production-representative engines or real mission systems architecture; JMR will show off technologies to enable Army rotary-wing aviation to make the next leap in speed, lift, protection, and interoperability under FVL for the 2030s.

The program is intentionally slow-paced partly due to the challenges seen in the Joint Strike Fighter program and failures of past programs like Future Combat Systems, which was cancelled after complex requirements could not be met within established budgets and timelines. A contract for a joint common architecture standard was to be awarded in July 2014 for lab-based testing, and the FVL RFP is to be issued in 2019. The Sikorsky-Boeing team submitted the SB-1 Defiant design and risk report to the Army in mid-June for JMR.

The Army is looking at five criteria to downselect JMR-TD entries: how much the design advances the services' science and technology goals; whether the design meets performance specifications; how well the demonstrator validates specifications; whether the competitor has kept to their schedule; and whether the company has the skills and competency to carry out a flight demonstration. Even with the prospect of sequestration returning in FY 2016, the JMR program will likely be spared from cuts or cancellation due to the Army's support of research and development programs. The demonstrator aircraft will have a lifespan of 200 flight hours, and the Army's budget is $240 million. In July 2014 the Army decided which two competitors would proceed to Phase One, but will hold program discussions with all four parties to determine a reasonable path forward before announcing the winners, which is expected to occur in late August or early September 2014. Earlier in July, the Army selected the Boeing-Sikorsky team to develop the Joint Common Architecture (JCA) standard "digital backbone" through which mission systems will be integrated into the FVL system's design.

=== Down selection ===
On 11 August 2014, the Army informed the Sikorsky-Boeing and Bell-Lockheed teams that they had chosen the SB-1 Defiant and V-280 Valor to continue with the JMR demonstration program. The aircraft designs show the Army is pursuing both coaxial and tilt-rotor designs, and preferring larger and established contractors over the smaller entries. AVX Aircraft says it is still in negotiations with the Army and believes they can still continue with some level of work on the program. Official word of the downselect was to be announced in late August once negotiations had been finalized. The Army formally announced the selection of the Sikorsky-Boeing SB-1 and Bell-Lockheed V-280 on 3 October 2014. Both teams will now build technology demonstration aircraft with flight tests starting in 2017. Though AVX and Karem Aircraft were not selected, the Army is still interested in technologies they have offered.

In early September 2014, a panel of aviation experts advised personnel from the FVL initiative how to avoid mistakes made by previous acquisition efforts, namely the F-35 Joint Strike Fighter. The panel had three suggestions: split the program into different manageable pieces; use the expertise of the commercial helicopter industry; and secure early support from the U.S. Congress. FVL is seeking to develop four separate lift classes, which may even become five if the program includes medium lift aircraft for the Navy and U.S. Marine Corps, so the sheer diversity of requirements casts doubt that a single program can successfully produce different versions of a given design.

One main problem the F-35 program encountered was having a single program to try to meet different needs with variants of one design. It is possible for FVL to avoid this and still meet it primary goals of using common drive trains, engines, and communications across different helicopters in different services; although the Army's Apache and Black Hawk designs are entirely different, the Marines' UH-1Y Venom utility and AH-1Z Viper attack helicopters have 85 percent parts commonality despite using different airframes. Money and time could be saved by using available technologies from commercial helicopter manufacturers, which was impossible to do with the high-performance F-35.

Even though the JSF has secured international partners and FVL has none, partners would be welcomed once the program officially starts, and pre-acquisition industry-to-industry cooperation was advised before government-to-government agreements occur. Congressional support was also advised to be secured early on, as keeping lawmakers in the dark caused lack of trust and imposition of reporting requirements for funding with the F-35. As Army Aviation purchase budgets has decreased 40% in 3 years, FVL funding could be conflicting with modernization of the current rotorcraft fleet.

In January 2015, the Army confirmed that the FVL-medium category would be split into two different versions, one for attack/reconnaissance and one for utility and troop carrying. Though the program seeks component commonality across the fleet, service leaders identified that different sized aircraft are needed for attack and troop-carrying, so the same airframe may not be used for both missions; other services may also tailor their own FVL-medium variants for specific needs. The versions may even use different forms of propulsion (one tiltrotor and one pusher propeller with coaxial blades), but nothing would be certain until the results of the 2018 TD test flights.

Text split from the Futures command article

Future Vertical Lift had planned to use the DoD modular open systems approach (MOSA), an integrated business and technical strategy in FARA, and in FLRAA FLRAA is anticipated to enter service by Fiscal Year 2030. By abstracting its requirements, the Army was able to request prototypes which used new technologies.

Joint Multi-Role Technology Demonstrator (JMR-TD) prototypes are to be built by two teams to replace Sikorsky UH-60 Blackhawks with Future Long-Range Assault Aircraft (FLRAA). The tilt-rotor FLRAA demonstrator by Bell is flying unmanned (October 2019); it logged 100 hours of flight testing by April 2019. Both Bell and Sikorsky-Boeing received contract awards to compete in a risk reduction effort (CDRRE) for FLRAA in March 2020. The risk reduction effort will be a 2-phase, 2-year competition. The competition will transition technologies (powertrain, drivetrain and control laws) from the previous demonstrators (JMR-TDs) of 2018–2019 to requirements, conceptual designs, and acquisition approach for the weapon system. The Army wants flight testing of FLRAA prototypes beginning in 2025, with fielding to the first units in 2030.

The Future Attack Reconnaissance Aircraft (FARA) was to be smaller than FLRAA. The Army's requests for proposals (RFPs) for FARA were due in December 2018;

A long range precision munition for the Army's aircraft will begin its program of design and development. In the interim, the Army is evaluating the Spike 18–mile range non-line of sight missile on its Boeing AH-64E Apache attack helicopters.

On 5 December 2022, the Army announced that the V-280 Valor was selected by the program. The Sikorsky-Boeing team formally disputed the contract award later that month. On 6 April 2023, Government Accountability Office denied the protest.

In February 2024 the FARA program was cancelled; after expending $2 billion on its development, the 41st Chief of Staff of the Army announced that the $5 billion that had been allocated for FARA's future development for the next five years would be spent on Black Hawks, on the CH-47F Block II Chinook cargo helicopter, on the Future Long-Range Assault Aircraft (FLRAA), and on research and development for unmanned aerial reconnaissance capability. The effective use of drones in Ukraine was a factor in the decision.

==== Unmanned UH-60 ====
An unmanned UH-60 Black Hawk flew pilotless in July 2022. An FVL FLRAA (JMR-TD) flew unmanned in 2019.

== See also ==
- List of military aircraft of the United States
- List of future military aircraft of the United States
- List of VTOL aircraft
- Powered lift
- Quadcopter
- Bell Boeing Quad TiltRotor
