= Bell Eagle Eye =

1990s American tiltrotor UAV

Eagle Eye
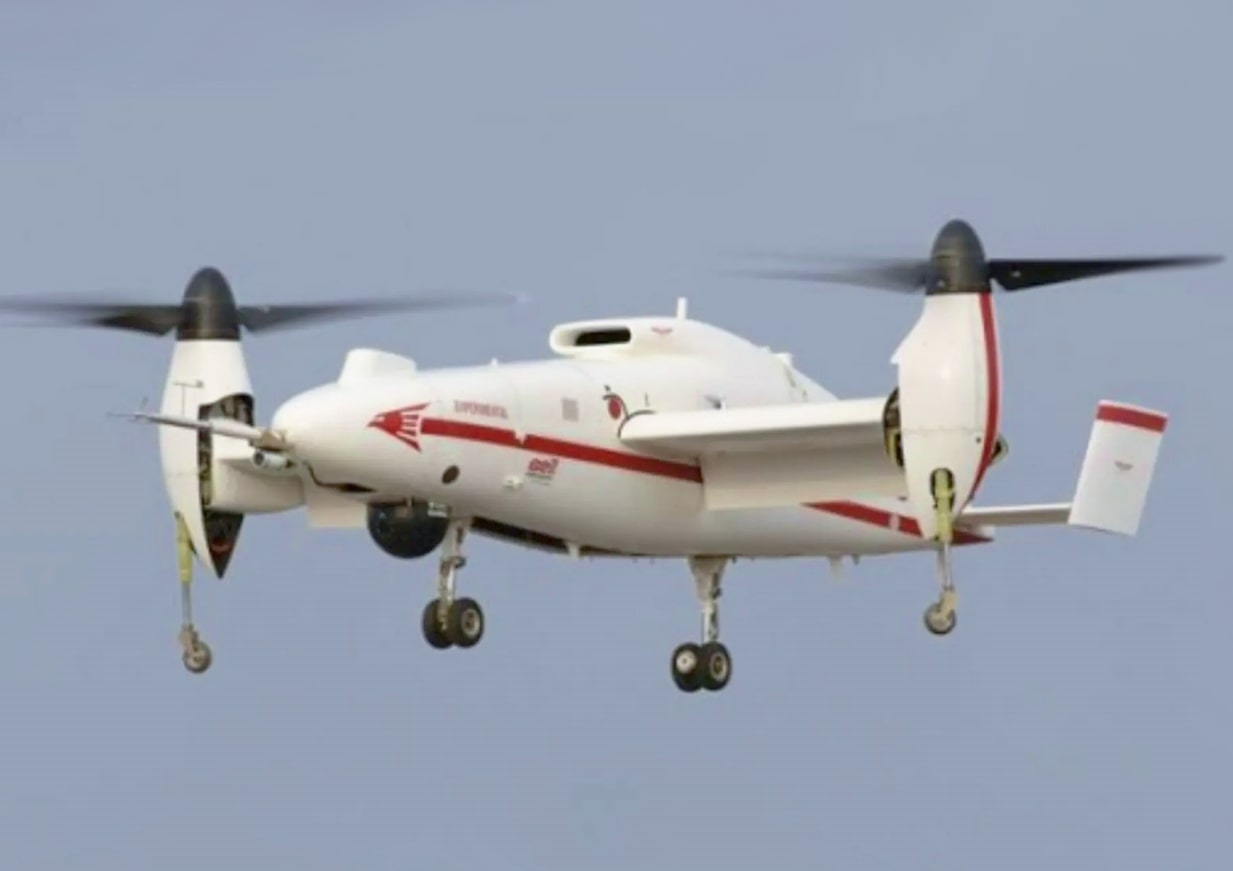
- Eagle Eye prototype in flight

General information
- Type: Tiltrotor unmanned aerial vehicle
- National origin: United States
- Manufacturer: Bell Helicopter

History
- First flight: March 6, 1998

The Bell Helicopter Eagle Eye is an American tiltrotor unmanned aerial vehicle that was offered as one of the competitors in the United States Navy's VT-UAV (Vertical Takeoff - Unmanned Aerial Vehicle) program.

== Development ==
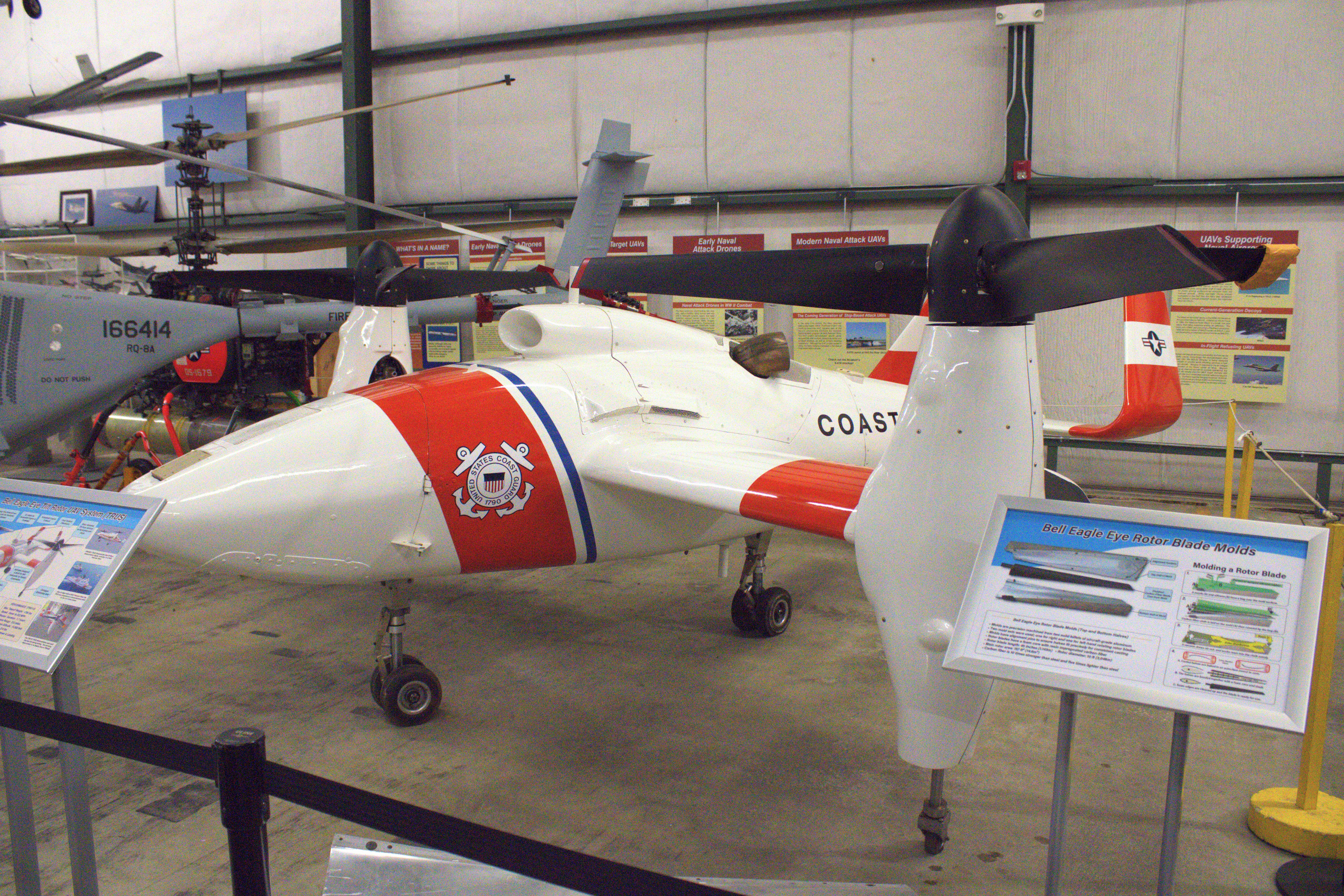
HV-911 Eagle Eye on display at Patuxent River Naval Air Museum

The Eagle Eye program began in 1993 with the TR911X 7/8th scale prototype. The composite airframe was originally designed and built for Bell by the California research company Scaled Composites. The two demonstrator aircraft were powered by an Allison 250-C20 turboshaft engine mounted in the center fuselage, with a transmission system driving a tilting rotor at the end of each wing.

The aircraft had its maiden flight on March 6, 1998, and then entered a flight test program. Phase 1 (land-based operations testing) was completed in April 1998. Phase 2 (sea-based testing) started shortly after that. The first prototype was destroyed in an accident, but the second successfully completed the test program.

These successes led to the entry into the Deepwater program in 2002 and construction of the full size vehicle, called the TR918, powered by a Pratt & Whitney Canada PW207D turboshaft engine.

Bell had promoted the Eagle Eye for a decade without finding a buyer, but in the summer of 2002, the United States Coast Guard ordered the UAV as part of the service's broad Deepwater re-equipment effort. The Coast Guard machine was slightly scaled up from the company demonstrator and was designated as Bell HV-911. It had a maximum speed of 200 kn (370 km/h) and an endurance of 5.5 hours with a 200-pound (91-kilogram) payload. The USCG then put funds marked for development and procurement of the vehicle on hold.

The US Navy and Marine Corps also expressed some interest, and there were inquiries from various foreign governments. In the summer of 2004, Bell established a relationship with Sagem in France and Rheinmetall Defense Electronics in Germany to sell variants of the Eagle Eye to European governments. Bell proposed to provide raw airframes, the European partners would provide payloads and other gear as specified by customers, and Bell would perform system integration.

The Eagle Eye prototype crashed in 2006, and Bell could not get enough interest or money to keep the program going. However, in January 2016, the U.S. Army said it was searching for a mid-sized "runway independent" UAV, years after losing interest in the Northrop Grumman MQ-8 Fire Scout. Although the Army has not specified whether it wants a rotorcraft, VTOL, tiltrotor, launch and recover, or other runway independent design, Bell sees potential for the Eagle Eye to meet Army requirements.

== Specifications ==
Data from

General characteristics

- Crew: none
- Length: 18 ft 3 in (5.56 m)
- Wingspan: 24 ft 2 in (7.37 m)
- Height: 6 ft 2 in (1.88 m)
- Empty weight: 1,300 lb (590 kg)
- Gross weight: 2,250 lb (1,020 kg)
- Powerplant: 1 × Pratt & Whitney Canada PW207D turboshaft , 641 hp (478 kW)
- Main rotor diameter: 2 × 10 ft 0 in (3.05 m)
- Main rotor area: 157 sq ft (14.6 m^{2})

Performance

- Maximum speed: 225 mph (360 km/h, 196 kn)
- Endurance: 6 hours
- Service ceiling: 20,000 ft (6,100 m)

Armament

- 200 pounds (91 kg) payload

== See also ==
Related development

- Bell V-247 Vigilant – Unmanned military tiltrotor concept
