= Bell MV-75 Cheyenne II =

American tiltrotor VTOL aircraft

MV-75 Cheyenne II V-280 Valor
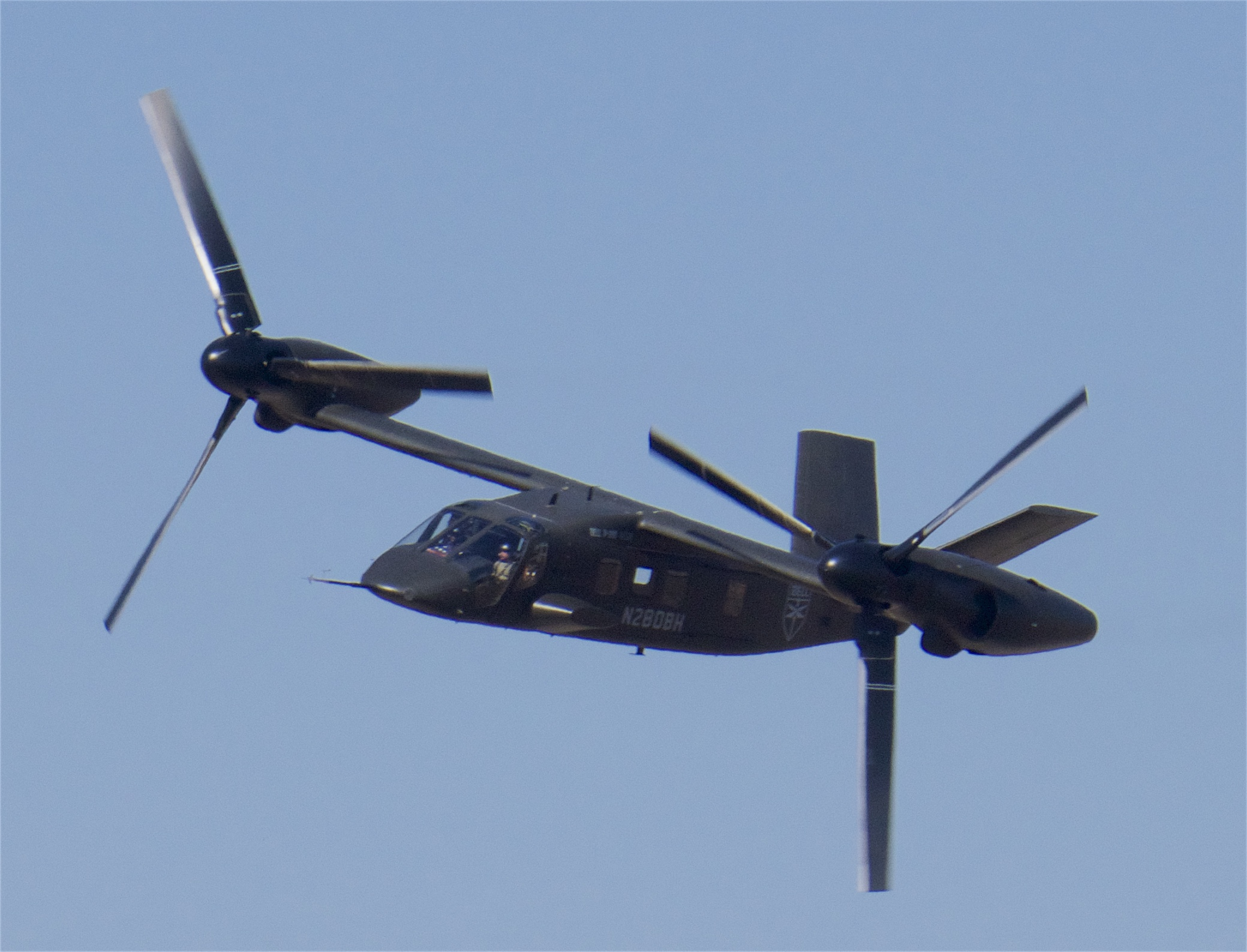
- A Bell V-280 in high-speed cruise configuration

General information
- Type: Assault/utility tiltrotor
- National origin: United States
- Manufacturer: Bell
- Status: Under development
- Service: 2027 (planned)
- Number built: 1

History
- First flight: 18 December 2017

The Bell MV-75 Cheyenne II is a tiltrotor aircraft being developed by Bell for the United States Army's Future Vertical Lift (FVL) program.

It originated from the Bell V-280 Valor technology demonstrator, whose design was unveiled in 2013 and which took its first flight on 18 December 2017. In 2022, the V-280 was chosen by the US Army as the winner of the Future Long-Range Assault Aircraft program to replace the Sikorsky UH-60 Black Hawk.

As of April 2024, limited user tests are planned for 2027 and 2028. The aircraft is expected to deploy in 2031.

== Development ==
Bell Helicopter unveiled the V-280 Valor design at the 2013 Army Aviation Association of America's (AAAA) Annual Professional Forum and Exposition in Fort Worth, Texas. That June, the company announced that the design had been selected by the US Army for the Joint Multi-Role (JMR) Technology Demonstrator (TD) phase, the technology demonstration precursor to Future Vertical Lift (FVL). The Army classified the offering as a Category I proposal: a well-conceived, scientifically or technically sound proposal pertinent to program goals and objectives with applicability to Army mission needs, offered by a responsible contractor with the competent scientific and technical staff supporting resources required to achieve results. JMR-TD contracts were expected to be awarded in September 2013, with flights scheduled for 2017.

In September 2013, Bell announced it would partner with Lockheed Martin to develop the V-280. Lockheed will provide integrated avionics, sensors, and weapons to the aircraft. Additional partners were announced in the following months, including Moog Inc. for the flight control systems, GE Aviation for the engines, GKN for the tail structure, Spirit AeroSystems for the composite fuselage, Eaton Corporation as the distributor of hydraulics and power generation systems, and Astronics Advanced Electric Systems to design and manufacture power distribution systems. Israel Aerospace Industries, the first international partner recruited for the V-280, will supply the nacelle structures. Textron sister company TRU Simulation & Training will build a high-fidelity marketing simulator and desktop maintenance trainer.

In October 2013, the U.S. Army awarded a technology investment agreement (TIA) to Bell for the V-280 Valor tiltrotor under the Joint Multi-Role program. Awards were also given to AVX Aircraft, Karem Aircraft, and a Sikorsky-Boeing team. The JMR program is not intended to develop a prototype for the next family of vehicles, but to develop technologies and interfaces. The TIAs give the four teams nine months to complete preliminary design of their rotorcraft, which the Army will then review and authorize the construction of two competing demonstrators to fly in 2017. Each of the four teams received $6.5 million from the Army for phase I of the program, although Bell is investing an undisclosed amount of its own money. On 21 October 2013, Bell unveiled the first full-scale mock-up of the V-280 Valor at Association of the United States Army 2013.

In August 2014, the Army informed the Bell-Lockheed team that they had chosen the V-280 Valor to continue with the JMR demonstration program. The Boeing-Sikorsky team offering the SB-1 Defiant was also chosen. Announcement of the selections was officially made on 3 October 2014, and the teams began building technology demonstration aircraft for test flights in 2017. Bell unveiled a full-scale mock-up of the V-280 Valor on the floor at AUSA 2014 to showcase the configuration and design of the high-speed platform.

It is focused on the infantry squad and is to handle much like a helicopter in terms of low-speed agility to have unprecedented pitch, roll, and yaw response for those operations. Roughly the size of the current medium-lift helicopter, the V-280 is designed to travel twice as fast and twice as far. Bell is pitching these capabilities for movement over vast areas like the Pacific. The program director said the need for forward arming and refueling points could be eliminated and that one FOB (forward operating base) in the middle of a country, such as Afghanistan, could cover the entire country.

Although Bell sold its share in the AW609 program in 2011, Bell continues to work on the AW609 and considers commercial potential for the V-280, as a military mass production of 2,000–4,000 aircraft could reduce unit cost to commercially acceptable levels. In 2016, Bell stated that it preferred the 609 for commercial use, and intended to offer the V-280 for military use only. Bell also stated that conventional helicopters were not part of Bell's military future.

The Bell V-280 was chosen over the Sikorsky Defiant X in December 2022. Sikorsky filed a protest after losing the contract, but the Government Accountability Office rejected it on the grounds that Bell's submission was more advantageous in more areas while Sikorsky's information had too many deficiencies and did not provide enough detail on how it would meet requirements.

=== Prototype ===
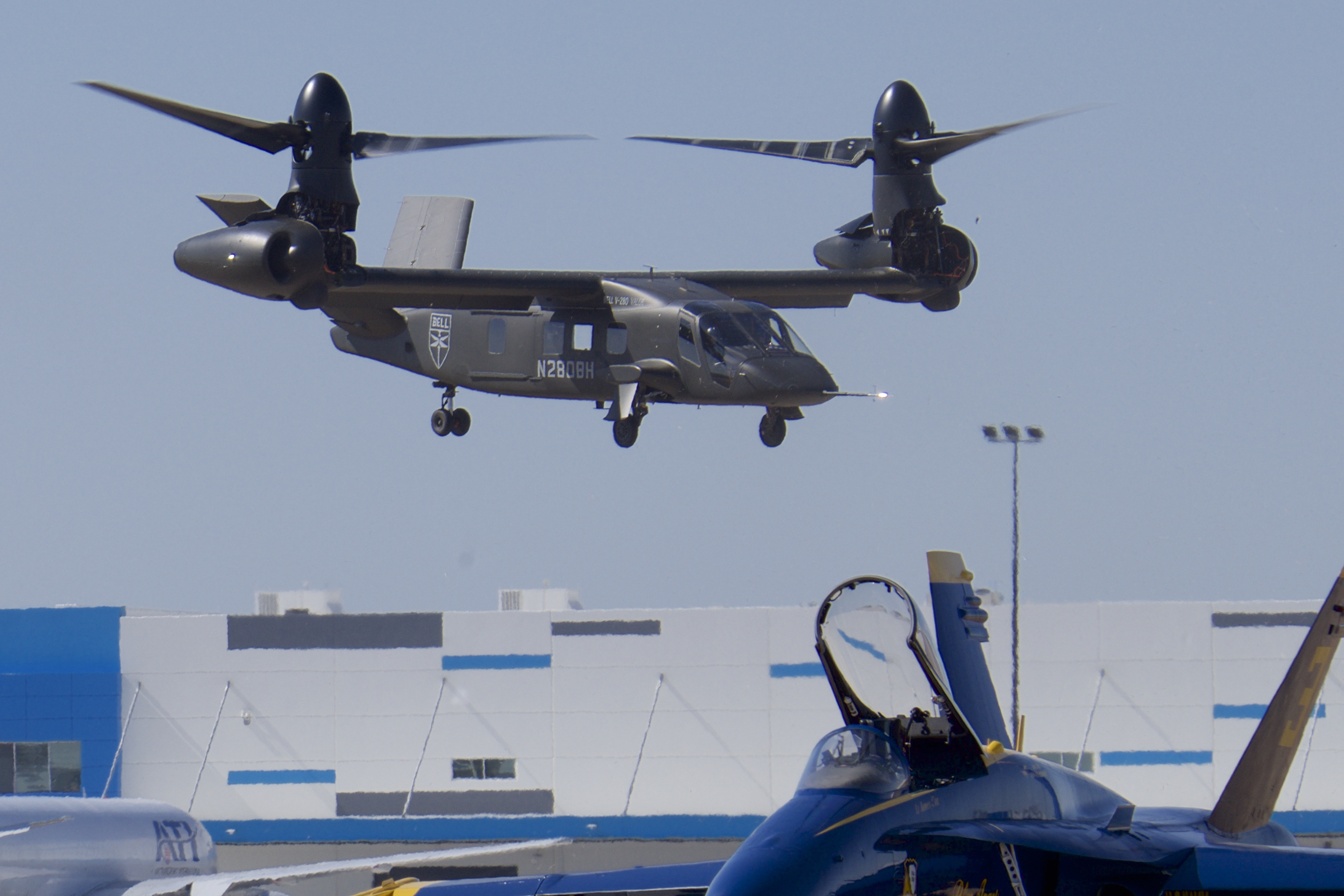
A V-280 Valor prototype in flight at the Alliance Air Show, Fort Worth, Texas, October 2019

In June 2015, Bell's subcontractor Spirit AeroSystems began to assemble the composite fuselage for the first prototype V-280 Valor, which was delivered in September 2015—just 22 months after design began. Although the V-280 was initially planned for the JMR demonstration program, Bell did not anticipate much difference between it and a final FVL entry. By January 2016, the V-280 demonstrator was nearly one-quarter complete The fuselage and wings were mated four months later. The demonstrator aircraft began ground vibration testing in Amarillo in February 2017, when the aircraft was 95 percent complete.

The demonstrator underwent ground tests in October 2017. It took its first flight on 18 December 2017 in Amarillo, Texas. Bell released a video of the first flight with the area around the pivots blurred.

In April 2018, the aircraft ran for 75 hours on the ground and flew for 19 hours, up to 80 knots (90 mph; 150 km/h). It first flew in airplane mode at the end of the month, attaining 140 knots (160 mph; 260 km/h) with proprotors 60-degrees forward. It reached 190 knots (220 mph; 350 km/h) in cruise mode with horizontal propellers in May 2018.

By October 2018, it had notched 155 hours of rotor turn time and 70 flight hours and had reached 250 knots (290 mph; 460 km/h) at 80% proprotor cruise speed. It was flown to a 45° bank angle at up to 200 knots (230 mph; 370 km/h), achieved a 4,500 ft/min (23 m/s) climb rate at 160 kn (180 mph; 300 km/h), exceeded 200 knots (230 mph; 370 km/h) with less than 50% torque, and recorded a peak load factor of 1.9 g. Its longest flight covered 370 mi (320 nmi; 600 km) as it performed a ferry flight to Arlington, Texas to continue testing closer to the US Army.

After one year of flight tests, it reached its 280 knots (320 mph; 520 km/h) target by January 2019. More tests expanded its flight envelope: low-speed agility, bank angles, and autonomous operations. In December 2020, the V-280 reached 305 knots (350 mph; 560 km/h) and passed 200 hours of flight time. The V-280 demonstrator was decommissioned in June 2021 after 214 hours of flight time and the aircraft was dismantled for inspection of its internal components; the airframe was later partially reassembled and used as a display model.

== Design ==
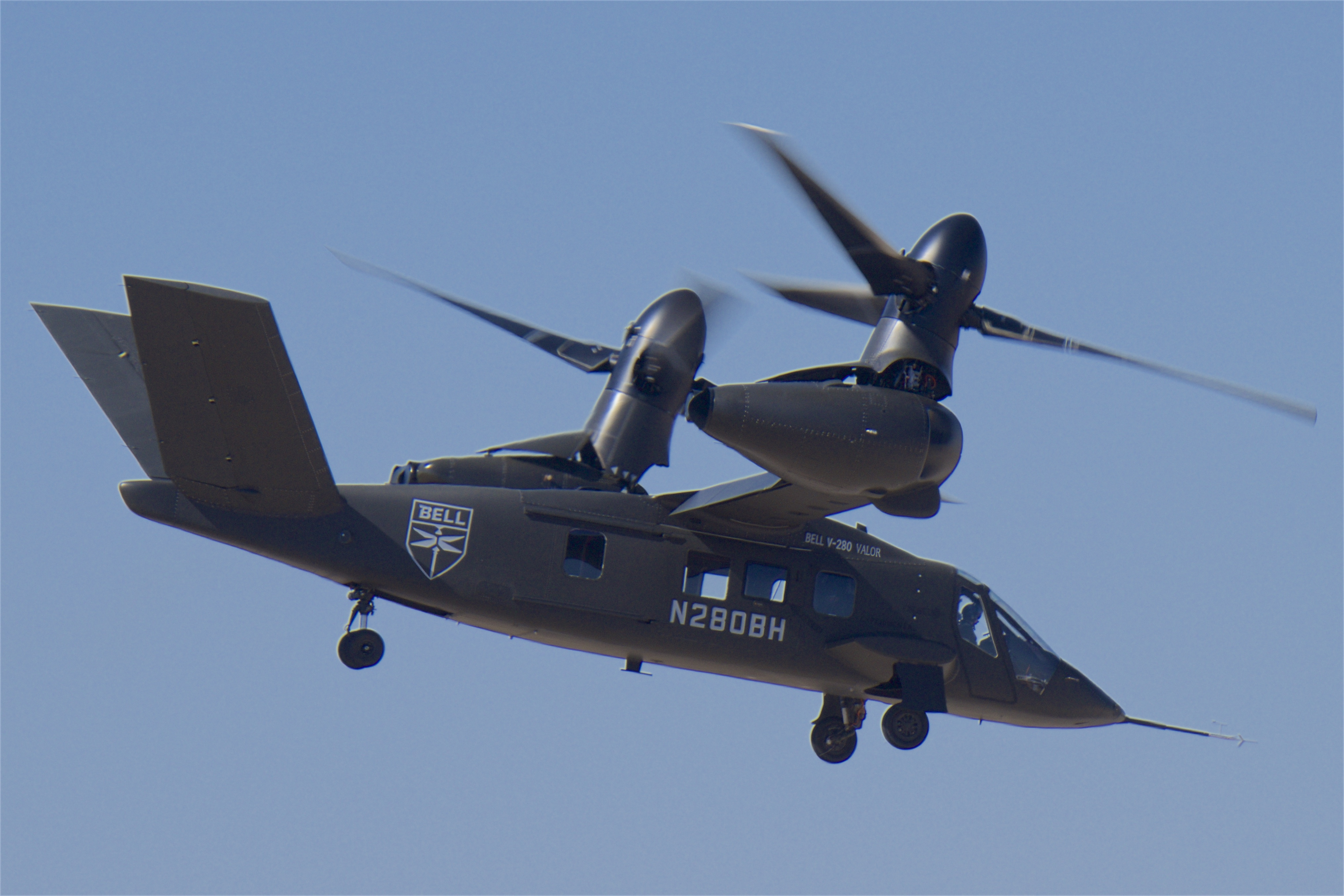
A V-280 in flight with rotors tilted to hover configuration

The V-280 is designed for a cruising speed of 280 knots (320 mph; 520 km/h), hence the name V-280. It has a top speed of 300 knots (345 mph; 556 km/h), a range of 2,100 nautical miles (2,400 mi; 3,900 km), and an effective combat range of 500 to 800 nmi (580 to 920 mi; 930 to 1,480 km). Expected maximum takeoff weight is around 30,000 pounds (14,000 kg).

Unlike the earlier V-22 Osprey tiltrotor, the MV-75's engines remain in place while the rotors and drive shafts tilt. A driveshaft runs through the straight wing, allowing both rotors to be driven by a single engine in the event of engine loss. The V-280 will have retractable landing gear, a triple-redundant fly by wire control system, and a V-tail configuration. Another improvement over the V-22 Osprey is a swashplate-controlled variable-pitch rotor. This enables the V-280 to have fine-grained maneuvering while hovering.

The wings are made of a single section of carbon fiber reinforced polymer composite, reducing weight and production costs. The V-280 will have a crew of four and transport up to 14 troops. Dual cargo hooks will enable it to carry a 10,000 lb (4,500 kg) M777A2 howitzer at 150 knots (170 mph; 280 km/h). The fuselage resembles that of the UH-60 Black Hawk medium-lift helicopter. The wings are set high on the fuselage—more than 7 ft (2.1 m) above the ground, when landed—allowing soldiers to step easily out of two 6-foot (1.8 m) wide side doors and door gunners to have wide fields of fire.

Bell is working on an attack configuration to add to the utility version; this might take the form of payload or an entirely different variant. The U.S. Marine Corps is interested in having one aircraft to replace utility and attack helicopters, but the Army, which leads the program, wants distinct platforms for each mission. Bell and Lockheed have said an AV-280 variant can launch rockets, missiles, and even small unmanned aerial vehicles forward or aft with no rotor interference, even in forward flight and cruise modes with the rotors forward.

The V-280 prototype (air vehicle concept demonstrator, or AVCD) was powered by the General Electric T64. The specific engine for the model performance specification (MPS) was unknown at the time, but has funding from the Army's future affordable turbine engine (FATE) program. The V-tail structure and ruddervators, made by GKN, will provide high levels of maneuverability and control to the airframe. It will be made of a combination of metals and composites. Features in the interior include seats that wirelessly charge troops' radios, night-vision goggles, and other electronic gear and windows that display three-dimensional mission maps.

To reduce cost and weight, the V-280 wing uses composites extensively in the wing, fuselage, and tail. Wing skins and ribs are made of a honeycomb-stiffened "sandwich" construction with large-cell carbon cores for fewer, larger, and lighter parts. Skins and ribs are paste-bonded together to eliminate fasteners. The wing costs about one-third less than a V-22 wing of the same size would. Bell expects the V-280 to cost around the same as an AH-64E or MH-60M. While the Osprey has a higher disk loading and lower hover efficiency than a helicopter, the V-280 will have a lower disk loading and longer wing for greater hover and cruise efficiency.

In October 2021, Bell and Rolls-Royce announced that the V-280 Valor powerplant would switch from the T64 turboshaft used on the prototype to the AE 1107F, a derivative of the Rolls-Royce T406/AE 1107C used on the Osprey. This would increase power from 5,000 to 7,000 horsepower, lower sustainment costs, and reduce development risk.

== Operational history ==
The V-280 was designated YMV-75A by the Department of Defense in November 2024. The MV-75 designation was officially announced in May 2025.

In April 2026, the aircraft was named "Cheyenne II" after both the Lockheed AH-56 Cheyenne, and the Cheyenne, an indigenous North American tribe that settled around the Great Lakes and the Great Plains. "With the MV-75, we honor a legacy forged in conflict, proven in battle, originally known to the U.S. Army as some of the most formidable and disciplined adversaries on the battlefield", Army Undersecretary Mike Obedal said.

== Specifications (V-280 prototype) ==
Data from Bellflight.com, National Interest blog

General characteristics

- Crew: 4
- Capacity: 14 troops
- Length: 50.5 ft (15.4 m)
- Width: 81.79 ft (24.93 m)
- Height: 23 ft 0 in (7 m)
- Empty weight: 18,078 lb (8,200 kg)
- Max takeoff weight: 30,000 lb (13,608 kg) (approx.)
- Payload: 10,000 pounds (4,500 kg)
- Powerplant: 2 × General Electric T64-GE-419 turboshaft, 6,000 shp (4,500 kW) each
- Main rotor diameter: 2 × 35 ft 0 in (10.7 m)
- Main rotor area: 962.1 sq ft (89.4 m^{2}) 3-bladed

Performance

- Maximum speed: 350 mph (560 km/h, 300 kn)
- Cruise speed: 320 mph (520 km/h, 280 kn)
- Combat range: 580–920 mi (930–1,480 km, 500–800 nmi)
- Ferry range: 2,400 mi (3,900 km, 2,100 nmi)
- Service ceiling: 20,000 ft (6,000 m) ; in hover out of ground effect at 95 °F (35 °C)
- Disk loading: 16 lb/sq ft (78 kg/m^{2})

== See also ==
- Future Vertical Lift
- Leonardo AW609

Related development

- Bell XV-15
- Bell Boeing V-22 Osprey

Aircraft of comparable role, configuration, and era

- Sikorsky–Boeing SB-1 Defiant
