= Bell Boeing Quad TiltRotor =

Proposed four-rotor derivative of the V-22 Osprey

Quad TiltRotor
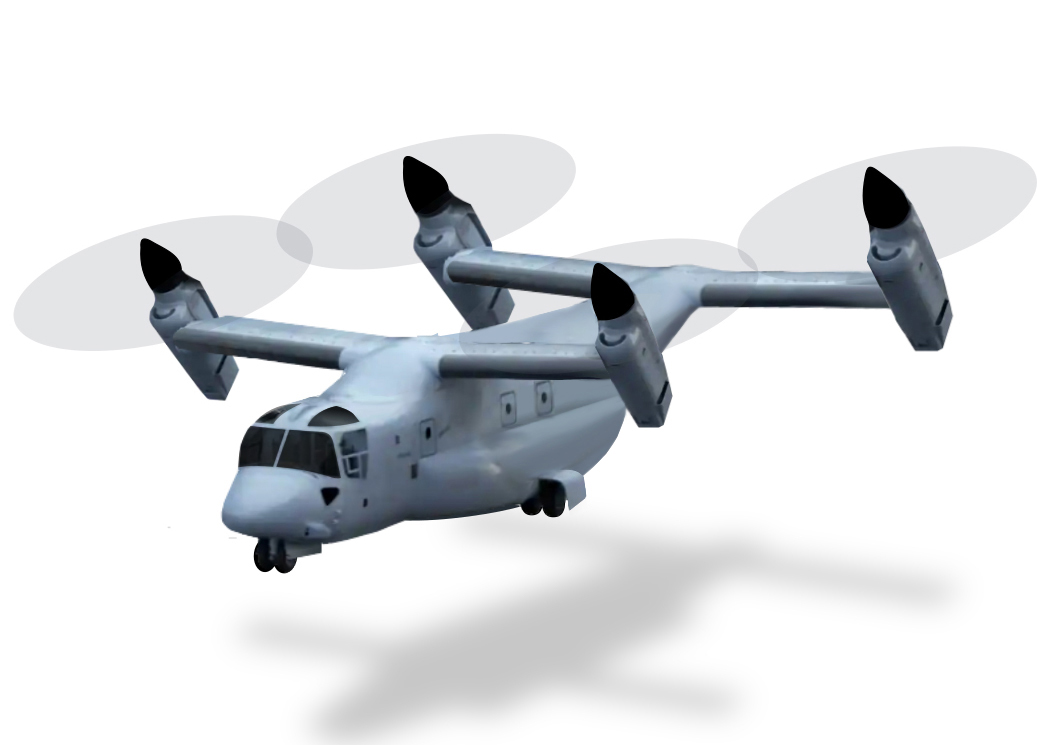
- Quad Tiltrotor art concept

General information
- Type: Cargo tiltrotor
- Manufacturer: Bell and Boeing
- Status: Study

History
- Developed from: Bell Boeing V-22 Osprey

The Bell Boeing Quad TiltRotor (QTR) is a proposed four-rotor derivative of the Bell Boeing V-22 Osprey developed jointly by Bell Helicopter and Boeing. The concept is a contender in the U.S. Army's Joint Heavy Lift program (a part of Future Vertical Lift program). It would have a cargo capacity roughly equivalent to the C-130 Hercules, cruise at 250 knots, and land at unimproved sites vertically like a helicopter.

== Development ==
=== Background ===
Bell developed its model D-322 as a quad tiltrotor concept in 1979. The Bell Boeing team disclosed a Quad TiltRotor design in 1999 which the companies had been investigating during the previous two years. The design was for a C-130-size V/STOL transport for the US Army's Future Transport Rotorcraft program and would have 50% commonality with the V-22. This design was to have a maximum takeoff weight of 100,000 lb (45,000 kg) with a payload of up to 25,000 lb (11,000 kg) in a hover. The design was downsized to be more V-22-based and to have a payload of 18,000 to 20,000 lb (8,200 to 9,100 kg). This version was referred to as "V-44". Bell received contracts to study related technologies in 2000. Development was not pursued by the US Department of Defense.

From 2000 to 2006, studies of the aerodynamics and performance of a Quad Tilt Rotor were conducted at the University of Maryland, College Park. This effort was initially funded by NASA/AFDD and subsequently by Bell. An experimental investigation in helicopter mode with ground effect found that it was possible to reduce the download on the aircraft from 10% of the total thrust to an upload of 10% of the thrust. A parallel Computational Fluid Dynamics (CFD) study confirmed these findings.

=== Joint Heavy Lift studies ===
In September 2005, Bell and Boeing received a cost-sharing contract worth US$3.45 million from the U.S. Army's Aviation Applied Technology Directorate for an 18-month conceptual design and analysis study lasting through March 2007, in conjunction with the Joint Heavy Lift program. The contract was awarded to Bell Helicopter, which is teaming with Boeing's Phantom Works. The QTR study is one of five designs; one of the five is also a Boeing program, an advanced version of the CH-47 Chinook.

During the initial baseline design study, Bell's engineers were designing the wing, engine and rotor, while the Boeing team was designing the fuselage and internal systems. A similar arrangement is used on the V-22.

A one-fifth-scale wind tunnel model had undergone testing in the Transonic Dynamics Tunnel (a unique transonic wind tunnel) at NASA's Langley Research Center during summer 2006. The "semi-span" model (representing the starboard half of the aircraft) measured 213 inches in length and had powered 91-inch rotors, operational nacelles, and "dynamically representative" wings.

The primary test objective was to study the aeroelastic effects on the aft wing of the forward wing's rotors and establish a baseline aircraft configuration. Alan Ewing, Bell's QTR program manager, reported that "Testing showed those loads from that vortex on the rear rotor [are the] same as the loads we see on the front [rotors]," and "Aeroelastic stability of the wing looks exactly the same as the conventional tiltrotor". These tests used a model with a three-bladed rotor, future tests will explore the effects of using a four-bladed system.

Besides the research performed jointly under the contract, Bell had funded additional research and wind tunnel testing in cooperation with NASA and the Army. After submission of initial concept study reports, testing of full-scale components and possibly a sub-scale vehicle test program was expected to begin. Pending approval, first flight of a full-scale prototype aircraft was slated for 2012.

The study was completed in May 2007, with the Quad TiltRotor selected for further development. However, additional armor on Future Combat Systems manned ground vehicles caused their weight to increase from 20 tons to 27 tons, requiring a larger aircraft. In mid-2008, the U.S. Army continued the Joint Heavy Lift (JHL) studies with new contracts to the Bell-Boeing and Karem Aircraft/Lockheed Martin teams. The teams were to modify their designs to reach new JHL specifications. JHL became part of the new US Air Force/Army Joint Future Theater Lift (JFTL) program in 2008. In mid-2010, the US DoD was formulating a vertical lift aircraft plan with JFTL as a part. The DoD also requested information from the aerospace industry on technologies for JFTL in October 2010.

== Design ==
The conceptual design featured a large tandem wing aircraft with V-22 type engines and 50-foot (15 m) rotors at each of the four wing tips. The C-130-size fuselage would have a 747-inch (19.0 m) cargo bay with a rear loading ramp that could carry 110 paratroopers or 150 standard-seating passengers. In cargo configuration, it would accommodate eight 463L pallets. This baseline version includes a fully retractable refueling probe and an interconnecting drive system for power redundancy.

In addition, the Bell-Boeing team included eight possible variants, or "excursion designs", including a sea-based variant. The design team planned on payloads ranging from 16 to 26 tons and a range of 420 to 1,000 nautical miles (780 to 1,850 km). One of the design excursions explored, dubbed the "Big Boy", would have 55-foot (17 m) rotors and an 815-inch (20.7 m) cargo bay, making it able to carry one additional 463L pallet and accommodate a Stryker armored combat vehicle.

== See also ==
- Powered lift
- Future Vertical Lift

Related development

- Bell Boeing V-22 Osprey

Aircraft of comparable role, configuration, and era

- Bell X-22
- Curtiss-Wright X-19

Related lists

- List of military aircraft of the United States
- List of VTOL aircraft
