= DARPA FORESTER =

The DARPA FORESTER is a technology development program sponsored jointly by the Defense Advanced Research Projects Agency (DARPA) and the U.S. Army intended to produce an advanced airborne UHF radar system that can track personnel and vehicles on the ground when they are hidden by foliage. FORESTER is an acronym for FOPEN Reconnaissance, Surveillance, Tracking and Engagement Radar (FOPEN itself is an acronym for FOliage PENetration).

== Description ==
The FORESTER is a GMTI radar system with a resolution of 6 meters that is mounted inside a 21.5-foot (6.6 m) long pod and designed to be carried under an A160 Hummingbird helicopter unmanned aerial vehicle (UAV). The system is able to detect vehicles and walking soldiers underneath tree cover from a distance of 30 miles (48 km), giving battle planners the ability to detect potential ambushes. The pod is designed to swivel from its stowed in-line position 90 degrees to its deployed position. From a helicopter UAV hovering at 20,000 feet (6,100 m), FORESTER can cover a 155-square-mile (400 km^{2}) area.

According to FORESTER program manager Lyndall Beamer, "Employing the sensor system on the DARPA/U.S. Army A160 Hummingbird unmanned aerial vehicle [UAV] helicopter or other suitable platform will provide a robust, wide-area, all-weather, standoff capability."

Cost is anticipated to run US$2.5 million per unit, with a production goal of US$1 million per unit in quantities of 50 or more.

== Development ==
The FORESTER program is being managed by DARPA's Information Innovation Office (I2O), and the hardware is manufactured for DARPA by SRC at their Syracuse, NY, headquarters. The initial prototype for the FORESTER was flight tested using a UH-60 Blackhawk helicopter because the A160 had not yet completed its Phase 1 flight test program. Test flights with the A160 began in August 2008.
