= Abraham Karem =

Assyrian-Israeli UAV/drone aircraft designer

- אברהם כרם
- Born: June 27, 1937 (age 89); Baghdad, Iraq
- Citizenship: United States
- Education: Technion – Israel Institute of Technology
- Occupation: Engineer
- Known for: Predator (Drone), Overair Butterfly eVTOL
- Title: Founder of Karem Aircraft, Founder of Overair

Abraham Karem (Hebrew: אברהם כרם, Arabic: أبراهام كريم; born 1937) is an engineer and designer of fixed and rotary-wing unmanned aircraft. He is regarded as the founding father of UAV (drone) technology.

== Biography ==
Abraham Karem was born in Baghdad, Iraq, to a Jewish couple. His family moved to Israel in 1951, where he grew up. From an early age, he had an innate passion for aeronautics, and at the age of 14, he started building model aircraft. Karem is regarded as the founding father of UAV (drone) technology. He graduated as an aeronautical engineer from the Technion. He built his first drone, a glide decoy, during the Yom Kippur War for the Israeli Air Force. In the 1970s, he immigrated to the United States.

== Engineering career ==
In 1979, Karem founded Leading Systems Inc. in his home garage in California with engineer Jack Hertenstein, whom he had previously worked with at U.S. Aerospace company Developmental Sciences, and Jim Machin, a pre-med student whom Karem had met at a modeling meet. The trio then manufactured their first drone, the Albatross, which weighed 200 pounds, could stay aloft for 56 hours, and carried a television camera in its nose. The Albatross gained DARPA funding for flight tests, and its exceptional performance led Leading Systems to collaborate further with DARPA to develop a more sophisticated variant of the Albatross, called Amber. Both the Albatross and Amber were radio controlled and could be launched either like conventional aircraft, with retractable tricycle landing gear, or by canister like a rocket.

Karem credits part of his team's success to the fact that "the focus of the big defense contractors was directed elsewhere– the Apollo program, the B-2, the F-22, and commercial projects". Nevertheless, Karem expected to build large numbers of the Amber for the U.S. military. However, in 1987, Congress slashed the budget for remotely piloted vehicles. Both the Army and the Navy rejected Karem's aircraft, and around the same time, the project was transferred from DARPA to a different office, which "promptly cancelled it". In 1990, the US defense contractor General Atomics bought the assets of Leading Systems out of bankruptcy, and hired Karem and other members of his team. General Atomics had been working in parallel, and making little success, on their own UAV, which they dubbed "the poor man's cruise missile". Together, they built the General Atomics MQ-1 Predator, which entered service in 1995 and was retired in 2018.

Karem has been described by The Economist magazine as the man who "created the robotic plane that transformed the way modern warfare is waged and continues to pioneer other airborne innovations". He is popularly referred to as the father of modern drones.

== Awards and recognition ==
In 2010, Karem was elected a member of the National Academy of Engineering for the development of long-endurance unmanned aerial vehicles and variable rotor speed VTOL aircraft systems.
