= Boeing A160 Hummingbird =

Unmanned aerial vehicle by Boeing (2002–2012)

A160 Hummingbird YMQ-18
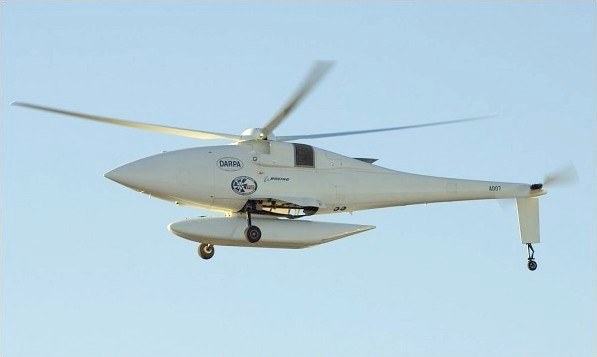

General information
- Type: UAV helicopter
- National origin: United States
- Manufacturer: Boeing Advanced Systems
- Status: abandoned in 2012
- Number built: 4+?

History
- First flight: 2002

The Boeing A160 Hummingbird (military designation: YMQ-18A) was an unmanned aerial vehicle (UAV) helicopter. Its design incorporated many technologies never before used in helicopters, allowing for greater endurance and altitude than any other helicopter.

The development of Hummingbird was initiated for DARPA by Frontier Aircraft in 1998. From 2003 both the US Army and the US Navy shared in funding the project. In May 2004, the company was acquired by Boeing and became integrated into Boeing Phantom Works and then into the Advanced Systems group of Boeing Integrated Defense Systems. Early A160s were powered by modified Subaru automotive engines, but newer versions used Pratt & Whitney PW207D turboshaft engines.

The A160 continued with developmental flight tests in 2010, but test flights had already demonstrated greater endurance, higher altitudes, more extensive autonomy, and greater payload. The program had ambitious goals of a 2,500-mile (4,000 km) range, 24-hour endurance, and 30,000 ft (9,100 m) altitude. Flights were largely autonomous, with the aircraft making its own decisions about how to fly so as to meet certain objectives, rather than relying on real-time human control. The A160 achieved maximum speeds of over 140 knots (260 km/h), though endurance and altitude were its goals, not speed. The aircraft measured 35 ft (11 m) from nose to tail and had a rotor diameter of 36 ft (11 m).

The project was abandoned by the US Army in December 2012.

== Design and development ==
=== Maverick and Renegade UAVs ===
During the initial development of the A160 airframe and rotor system in 1999 to 2000, Frontier Systems simultaneously designed the Maverick vertical take-off and landing (VTOL) UAV as a testbed for avionics, software and flight control systems. The Maverick was a highly modified version of the Robinson R22 light civilian helicopter. By using a proven helicopter airframe, engineers were able to focus on developing systems that could be later transferred to the A160.

The Maverick program began in 1998, with the first flight taking place less than a year later in 1999. Although the R22 was a two-seat manned helicopter in its original configuration, the Maverick was significant for never having used a "safety pilot" (a human pilot riding on board and capable of recovering the aircraft in the event of a failure of the unmanned flight control system). Since much of the software and avionics systems were shared between Maverick and A160, Maverick remained in service long after A160 began flight operations. After acquiring Frontier Systems in 2004, Boeing halted most development of Maverick but it continued flying as a training asset and for reducing risk in technology development for the A160.

Four Mavericks were flown by the US Navy, carrying Wescam Electro-Optical/Infrared sensor system, possibly among other sensors. Since being acquired by the military, most Maverick operations are unpublicized.

March 2006 saw the completion of the Software Enabled Control program sponsored by the Defense Advanced Research Projects Agency(DARPA). With the help of researchers from UC Berkeley, MIT, and Georgia Tech, Boeing developed a variant of its Maverick UAV platform which became known as the Renegade UAV. This aircraft successfully performed various maneuvers and flew routes without real-time human input.

=== A160 ===
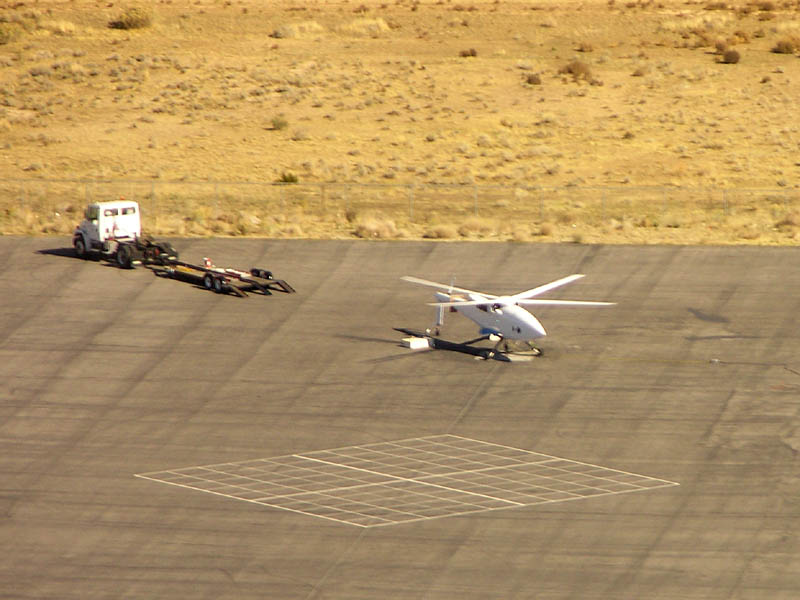
The A160 during ground runs at the Southern California Logistics Airport at Victorville, California

The development program for the A160 began when DARPA awarded a 30-month technology demonstration contract to San Diego–based Frontier Systems in March 1998, owned by UAV pioneer Abe Karem. In June 1999, Frontier tested the autonomous flight control system with the Maverick-A, a modified Robinson R22. This test bed was lost during a crash in 2000, after having flown for 215 hours. The first prototype, a three-blade A160, demonstrated a brief hover on December 7, 2001, and performed its first forward flight on January 29, 2002.

A four-blade version of the A160 flew in November 2002 using a Subaru four-cylinder engine, and later a six-cylinder piston engine. Frontier Systems was awarded a contract for four more A160s in October 2003. A total of three vehicles were produced by Frontier Systems. Vehicles 1 and 3 were lost in crashes. Frontier began a planned KW600 Diesel engine for the vehicle, but never completed it. A Diesel engine would have nearly doubled the vehicle endurance due to lower fuel consumption.

Frontier Aircraft, and later Boeing, carried out the A160 program as part of a series of contracts with Defense Advanced Research Projects Agency (DARPA), the United States Army, and the United States Navy from 2003. In September 2003, DARPA awarded Frontier a $75 million contract for the design, development and testing of four A160s.

The A160's rotor includes blades whose stiffness and cross-section vary along their length. Their low loading and rigid, hingeless design allows for changing RPM between 140 and 350 using a two-speed transmission to optimize efficiency at different speeds and altitudes, a technique called "optimum speed rotor technology", invented by Abe Karem. It is primarily because of these features that the Hummingbird can fly with less power - and thus use less fuel - than comparable conventional helicopters, which only adjust blade pitch and keep the rotor at constant rpm.

In August 2005, Frontier Systems, by then a Boeing subsidiary, received a $50 million contract from the Naval Air Warfare Center Aircraft Division "to assess the military utility and affordability of a long-range VTOL UAV employing a wide variety of adaptable payloads".

In October 2007, DARPA awarded Boeing a $6.3 million contract to deliver an A160T aircraft and modified pod for the Autonomous Real-time Ground Ubiquitous Surveillance-Imaging System (ARGUS-IS) program. In 2008, DARPA considered stub wings carrying weapons.

== Operational history ==
=== Flight testing ===
The Hummingbird made its first flight in January 2002, using a 6-cylinder Subaru engine. On September 20, 2004, the Hummingbird made its first flight since Boeing took over the program the previous May. The test program operated from the Southern California Logistics Airport near Victorville, California.

In August 2005, the Hummingbird was flown around Victorville in a 1,200-mile course at 60 knots and 4000 feet. A mechanical failure caused the helicopter to crash near the end of the flight and flight testing continued some months later after the crash investigation was concluded. On November 30, 2005, the aircraft successfully completed its first flight with a new 290 kW (390 hp) 6-cylinder gasoline-powered piston engine, hovering about the airfield for about half an hour.

A follow-up turboshaft-powered version, the A160T, was first flown on June 15, 2007. It was flown for 8 hours on September 27, 2007, while carrying a 1,000-pound payload. On October 12 it flew for 12 hours while carrying a 500-pound payload, simulating a multi-sensor military reconnaissance mission. This latter flight used up less than 60% of the Hummingbird's maximum fuel load.

On December 10, 2007, one of the A160T prototypes crashed during a flight test at Boeing Advanced Systems' test facility in Victorville. A Boeing investigation determined the incident was caused when sensor data stopped being updated to the flight computer: with the feedback loop for the control system effectively cut, the helicopter "departed controlled flight and impacted the ground at a near-vertical angle." Much of the forensic evidence was burned in the post-crash fire. A number of potential areas that could have caused the software feedback update thread to stop were found, and those known problem areas were addressed and flight testing resumed on March 26, 2008.

On May 9, 2008, at Yuma Proving Ground in Arizona, the A160T demonstrated its ability to hover out of ground effect (HOGE) at 15,000 feet to meet its DARPA milestone. It then surpassed the milestone during the same flight by repeating the HOGE at 20,000 feet altitude. A week later, starting the night of May 14, the A160T demonstrated its un-refueled endurance capabilities with an 18.7-hour flight, landing with over 90 minutes of fuel still on board. This was recognized as the longest un-refueled flight of any rotorcraft, and the Fédération Aéronautique Internationale (FAI) awarded Boeing the official endurance record in the 500 kg to 2,500 kg autonomously controlled UAV class for the flight.

Earlier, in May 2004, the U.S. Army Communications-Electronics Command awarded Syracuse Research Corp. a $13.3 million contract for the ultra high frequency, foliage penetrating, real-time moving target indicator/synthetic aperture radar for use in the A160. In August 2008, the A160T began flight testing what came to be known as the DARPA FORESTER radar system.

In August 2009, the A160T was chosen by the US Marine Corps along with the Kaman K-MAX to demonstrate the ability to move 6,000 lb (2,722 kg) of cargo in less than 6 hours for three consecutive days. The A160T successfully completed the re-supply demonstration in early March 2010. In December 2010, NAVAIR awarded a $29.9 million contract to Boeing for two A160Ts and control systems. Kaman received a similar contract worth $46M. NAVAIR issued a stop-work order on the A160 in December 2011, before a Quick Reaction Assessment. The K-MAX was eventually chosen over the A160T for the unmanned resupply role by the Marines, and was sent to Afghanistan in 2011.

On July 28, 2010, an A160T crashed at Southern California Logistics Airport. It autorotated to the ground then rolled on its side.

In August 2010, the A160T underwent jungle test flights in Belize for the U.S. Special Operations Command. Two airframes were involved in tests of the ability of DARPA FORESTER foliage-penetrating radar to penetrate jungle cover. The tests were stopped one week early when one aircraft crashed on September 4, 2010, at the Central Farm airfield in Cayo, Belize as the Special Operations Command was turning over its A160s to the Army in 2011. A further crash caused by vibration occurred at Victorville on April 17, 2012, damaging the ARGUS sensor and the aircraft.

=== U.S. Army cancellation ===
The A160 was to be deployed to Afghanistan with the ARGUS-IS camera in June 2012. But just before deployment, the Army issued a stop-work order to Boeing because the aircraft had a high "probability of continued technical and schedule delays," and costs and risks had "increased so significantly that program continuation was no longer in the best interest of the government." Vibration was among the issues. The stop-work order left the A160 still officially developmental, but close to termination. By December 2012, the Army Training and Doctrine Command had reviewed the Army's idea for a VTOL helicopter UAV for ISR missions and decided that, because of budget constraints, they would not continue to pursue the idea. They instead decided that the Army would keep using the fixed-wing UAVs they already had for the role.

== Specifications ==
Data from Boeing.

General characteristics

- Crew: 0
- Length: 35 ft 0 in (10.7 m)
- Empty weight: 2,500 lb (1,134 kg)
- Gross weight: 6,500 lb (2,948 kg)
- Powerplant: 1 × Pratt & Whitney Canada PW207D , 550 hp (410 kW)
- Main rotor diameter: 36 ft 0 in (11 m)

Performance

- Maximum speed: 160 mph (258 km/h, 140 kn)
- Range: 2,590 mi (4,170 km, 2,250 nmi)
- Endurance: 20+ hours
- Service ceiling: 20,000–30,000 ft (6,100–9,150 m)
- Maximum glide ratio: 7 (according to Karem)

== See also ==
- Boeing X-45
- Northrop Grumman MQ-8 Fire Scout
- Unmanned aerial vehicle
