= Karem Aircraft =

American aerospace company

Karem Aircraft, Inc. is an American aerospace manufacturer company with offices in Lake Forest, California; York, Virginia; and Victorville, California, founded in 2004 by Abraham Karem as a rapid development firm specializing in advanced tiltrotor transport aircraft. Karem was the former chief designer for the Israeli Air Force — who built his first drone during 1973's Yom Kippur War — and was described in 2012 by The Economist as the man who "created the robotic plane that transformed the way modern warfare is waged — and continues to pioneer other airborne innovations". He emigrated to the United States in the late 1970s.

== History ==
Under his previous company, Leading Systems Inc. (LSI), Karem led teams that developed the Amber and Gnat 750 (predecessors of the General Atomics MQ-1 Predator), unmanned aerial vehicle (UAV) systems, as well as the A160 Hummingbird Optimum-Speed Rotor UAV, later a Boeing product. Leading Systems has since gone bankrupt and was bought up by United States defense contractor General Atomics. The CIA secretly purchased five drones (later named the "Gnat") from them. Karem agreed to produce a quiet engine, which until then sounded like "a lawnmower in the sky". The new development was renamed the "Predator".

The Hummingbird was developed by Frontier Aircraft. In May 2004, the company was acquired by Boeing and integrated into Boeing Phantom Works and then into the Advanced Systems group of Boeing Integrated Defense Systems.

In early 2008, Karem Aircraft teamed with Lockheed Martin in offering Karem's Optimum Speed Tilt-Rotor (OSTR) design for the United States Department of Defense Joint Heavy Lift program. In 2018, Karem Aircraft announced a partnership with Uber Air to develop a flying taxi.

In October 2019, Karem unveiled the Karem AR40 military helicopter for the Future Attack Reconnaissance Aircraft program.

== Products ==
Frontier Aircraft

- Amber
- Gnat 750
- Boeing A160 Hummingbird
