= Bensen B-6 =

B-6
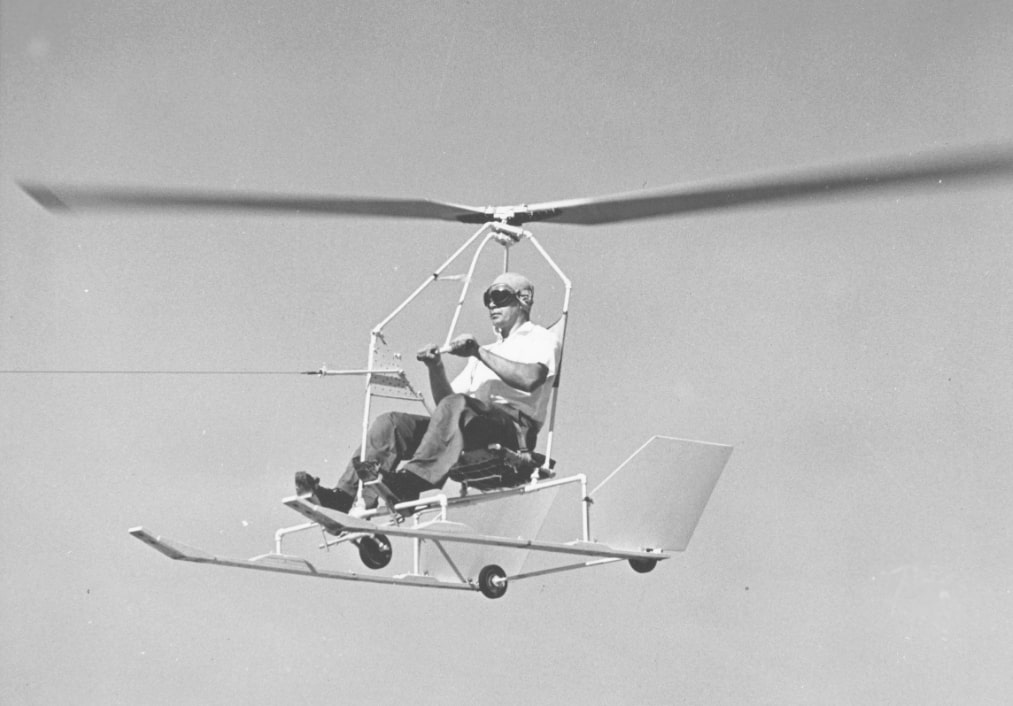

General information
- Type: Recreational rotor kite
- National origin: USA
- Manufacturer: Bensen Aircraft for homebuilding
- Designer: Igor Bensen

History
- First flight: 1953

The Bensen B-6 is a small rotor kite developed by Igor Bensen in the United States in the early 1950s and marketed for home building. It was a minimalist design based on Bensen's B-5 and consisting of little more than a seat mounted on wooden skids and with a two-blade rotor mounted on a tubular framework above it. Small fins for directional stability were mounted at the rear of the skids. The pitch of the rotors was fixed, but a handlebar allowed them to be tilted for directional control.

The B-6 was intended to be towed aloft behind a car or boat. The machine became airborne at 19 mph (31 km/h), and with 300 ft (90 m) of tow rope, could achieve a maximum altitude of 150 ft (46 m). The rope could be detached to allow the machine to autorotate to the ground, taking up to 15 minutes to do so. The machine could also become airborne in a sufficiently strong wind of around 23 mph (37 km/h).

== Specifications ==
General characteristics

- Crew: One pilot
- Length: 6 ft 8 in (2.03 m)
- Height: 5 ft 4 in (1.63 m)
- Empty weight: 103 lb (47 kg)
- Gross weight: 353 lb (160 kg)
- Main rotor diameter: 20 ft 0 in (6.10 m)
- Main rotor area: 314 sq ft (29.2 m^{2})

Performance

- Maximum speed: 60 mph (97 km/h, 52 kn)

== See also and other ships ==
Related development

- Bensen Mid-Jet
