= Airborne Forces Experimental Establishment =

Former Air Ministry research and development establishment

- Active: 15 February 1942 - 14 September 1950
- Disbanded: 14 September 1950
- Country: United Kingdom
- Type: Research establishment
- Role: Research into Airborne Forces deployment / equipment
- Part of: Air Ministry

The Airborne Forces Experimental Establishment (AFEE) was a branch of the British Air Ministry, that researched and developed non-traditional airborne applications, such as gliders, rotary wing aircraft, and dropping of personnel and equipment by parachute, in the period 1942–1950.

== Formation (1942) ==
On 15 February 1942, the Airborne Forces Experimental Establishment was formed as a reorganisation of the Airborne Forces Establishment, that itself was a September 1941 renaming of the Central Landing Establishment. The AFEE was initially based at RAF Ringway as part of No. 70 Group RAF, with two flying units, A Flight and B Flight. At Ringway, one of the existing projects was the Hafner Rotachute, a rotor kite (unpowered autogiro) that was planned to deliver an armed soldier to a battlefield more accurately and reliably than conventional parachute methods. During 1941, unmanned models had already completed ground-based tests plus some releases from aircraft in flight.

== Wartime developments (1942–1944) ==
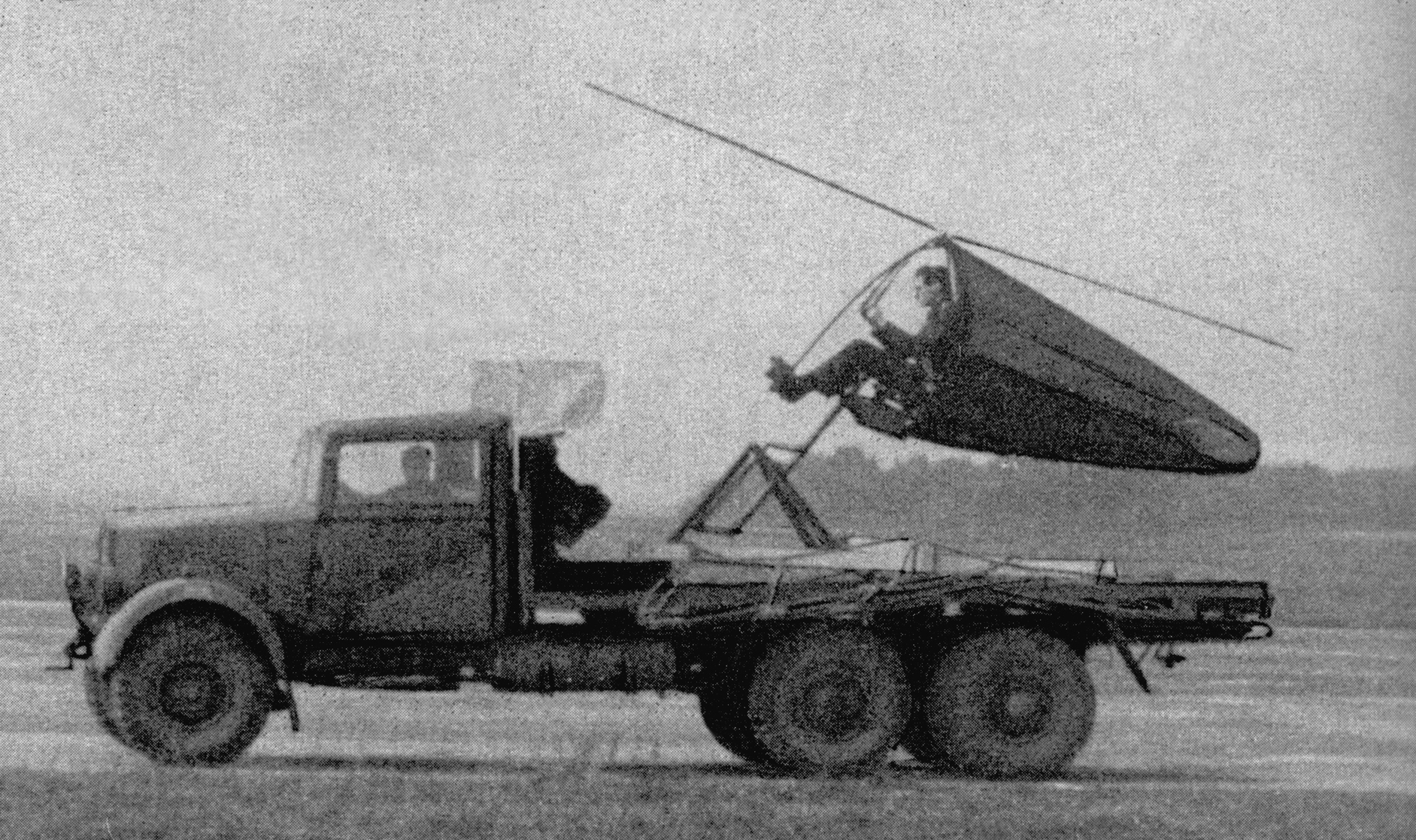
Ground test of a Rotachute III at Ringway, 1942

Manned trials of the Rotachute began in early 1942, towed firstly behind ground vehicles, then behind aircraft. The original concept proved difficult to achieve with safety and stability, but flights continued to help research flight characteristics for a follow-on project, the Hafner Rotabuggy, an air-towed land vehicle with autogiro capabilities. On 1 July 1942, because of intensive activity at Ringway, AFEE moved to RAF Sherburn-in-Elmet, as part of RAF No. 21 Group. Development of the Rotabuggy took place mostly in 1943, but its planned role was taken over by the development of heavy gliders. In the period 1942–1944, trials of rotary wing and parachute developments were conducted at Ringway, Sherburn-in-Elmet and during detachments to various other airfields, such as RAF Snaith, RAF Chelveston, RAF Newmarket, RAF Riccall, RAF Burn, RAF Hartford Bridge, RAF Farnborough and RAF Beaulieu. A large and varied fleet of powered support aircraft was used, mostly for parachute-dropping and glider-towing. Those included examples of Bombay, Dakota, Halifax, Hector, Heyford, Hudson, Lysander, Manchester, Martinet, Master, Mitchell, Mosquito, Overstrand, Spitfire, Stirling, Tiger Moth, Warwick, Wellington, Whitley, Wildcat. Gliders tested included Baynes Bat, Hamilcar, Hengist, Horsa, Hotspur and Twin Hotspur. AFEE also conducted testing of captured rotary wing aircraft, such as examples of the Focke-Achgelis Fa 330 'kite' autogiro.

== Beaulieu (1945) ==
On 4 January 1945, the whole of the AFEE was relocated to RAF Beaulieu, that had been vacated by USAAF bomber units. It joined an existing detachment there of its A Flight, and AFEE came under control of RAF No. 43 Group. The adjacent former airfield at East Boldre was used as a dropping zone. Activities included specialist training of pilots for helicopters and gliders. Types tested included gliders AW.52, GAL.55, GAL.56, GAL.61, Waco CG-13, plus helicopters Bristol 171, Cierva W.14 Skeeter, Cierva Air Horse, Sikorsky Hoverfly. Additional support aircraft included Boston, Cierva C.40, Curtiss Commando, Dragonfly, Harvard, Hastings, Lancaster, Valetta.

Captured types tested at Beaulieu included a Flettner Fl 282 helicopter, and a Focke-Achgelis Fa 223 that had been delivered on 6 September 1945 in the first crossing of the English Channel by a helicopter.

== Disbanded (1950) ==
On 14 September 1950, AFEE was disbanded, and most of its equipment and personnel were transferred to the Aeroplane and Armament Experimental Establishment at RAF Boscombe Down. Helicopter training functions were transferred to RAF Andover.

== Notable AFEE personnel ==
J.A.J. Bennett, F. John Cable ('Jeep' Cable), Norman Coslett, John Norman Dennis, O.L.L. Fitzwilliams, Raoul Hafner, Sir Gordon Harvey, W.G. Jennings, Robert Kronfeld, C.H. Latimer-Needham, Lt. Col. Robert 'Bob' Smith, I.M. Little, Air Commodore Allen Wheeler OBE RAF, Peter R.D. Wilson.

== Bibliography ==
- "Fa 223...Henrich Focke's Singular Kite", Part One. Air International, May 1984, Vol. 26 No. 5
- Sturtivant, Ray. 1995. British Prototype Aircraft. Haynes ISBN 1856482219
- Sturtivant, Ray and Hamlin, John. 2007. RAF Flying Training and Support Units. Air-Britain ISBN 085130365X
