= Bensen B-5 =

B-5

General information
- Type: Recreational rotor kite
- National origin: USA
- Manufacturer: Bensen Aircraft for homebuilding
- Designer: Igor Bensen

History
- First flight: 1953

The Bensen B-5 was a small rotor kite developed by Igor Bensen in the United States and offered and marketed for home building in 1954. Dubbed the "Gyro-Glider", it was the first of several such designs that would be sold by Bensen Aircraft Corporation over the following decades.

The B-5 was built around a cruciform frame of aluminum tube. Landing wheels were fitted to three points of this cross, and a mast was fitted above its centre to support the rotor hub. The fourth arm of the cross provided a mounting for a large, plywood fin and rudder, reminiscent of that of the Raoul Hafner's Rotachute that had shaped Bensen's thinking about rotor kite design.

The aircraft was intended to be towed behind a car, and could be built at home from easily obtained materials in about three to four weeks.

The B-5 was also the model converted to the Bensen Mid-Jet which was powered by two tip mounted ramjets for military use.
