= Bensen B-9 =

B-9 Little Zipster

General information
- Type: Recreational helicopter
- National origin: USA
- Manufacturer: Bensen Aircraft for homebuilding
- Designer: Igor Bensen

History
- First flight: 1958

The Bensen B-9 Little Zipster was a small helicopter developed by Igor Bensen in the United States in the 1950s and marketed for home building. Similar in general configuration to Bensen's previous rotor kite and autogyro designs, it consisted of an open aluminum framework but substituted the autorotating main rotor for a coaxial, counter-rotating system of two, two-bladed rotors. A large tailfin provided directional stability, and the aircraft was controlled by a handlebar system extending over the pilot's head to the rotor hub.

== Specifications ==
General characteristics

- Crew: One pilot
- Length: 11 ft 6 in (3.51 m)
- Empty weight: 450 lb (200 kg)
- Gross weight: 700 lb (320 kg)
- Powerplant: 1 × Mercury engine , 70 hp (55 kW)
- Main rotor diameter: 2 × 22 ft 0 in (6.71 m)
- Main rotor area: 694 sq ft (64.5 m^{2})

Performance

- Maximum speed: 80 mph (130 km/h, 70 kn)
- Range: 100 mi (160 km, 87 nmi)
- Service ceiling: 11,000 ft (3,400 m)
- Rate of climb: 900 ft/min (4.6 m/s)
