= Focke-Achgelis Fa 330 =

Type of rotary-wing kite

Fa 330 Bachstelze
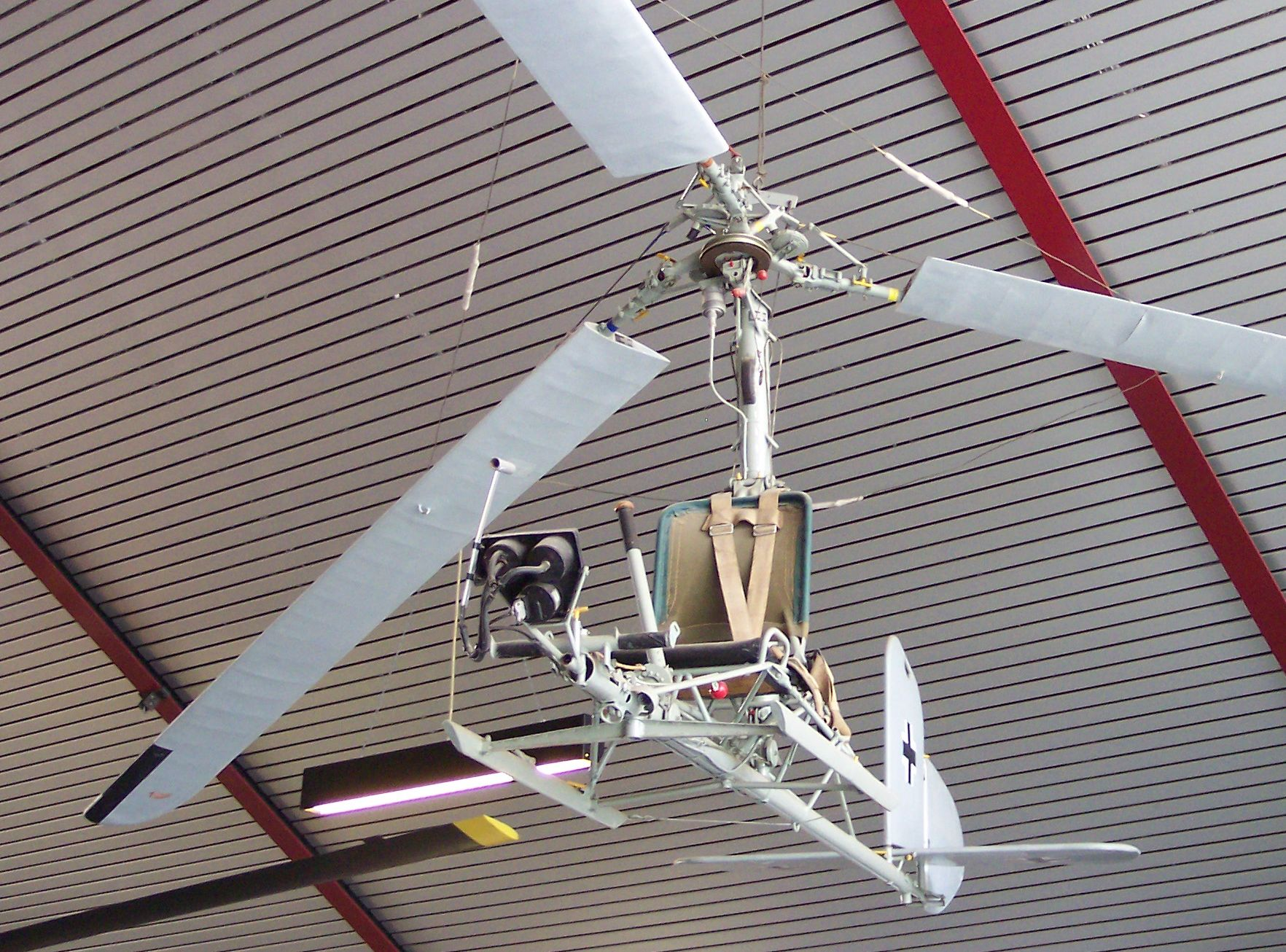
- An Fa 330 on display at the Hubschraubermuseum

General information
- Type: Rotor kite
- Manufacturer: Weser Flugzeugbau
- Designer: Focke-Achgelis GmbH Henrich Focke (Designer)
- Primary user: Kriegsmarine
- Number built: 200

History
- First flight: August 1942

The Focke-Achgelis Fa 330 Bachstelze (English: Wagtail) is a type of rotary-wing kite, known as a rotor kite. They were towed behind German Type IXD2 U-boats during World War II to allow a lookout to see further. About 200 were built by Weser Flugzeugbau.

== Development ==
Because of their low profile in the water, submarines could not see more than a few miles over the ocean. To solve this, the German admiralty considered a number of different options, including a folding seaplane (Arado Ar 231). In the end, they chose the Fa 330, a simple, single-seat autogyro kite with a three-bladed rotor.

The Fa 330 could be deployed from a small platform mounted on the anti-aircraft gun deck of the conning tower of the submarine by four people and was tethered to the U-boat by a 300 m (980 ft) cable. The airflow on the rotors as the boat motored along on the surface would spin them up. The kite would then be deployed behind the U-boat with its observer-pilot aboard, raising him approximately 120 meters above the surface and allowing him to see much farther — about 25 nautical miles (46 kilometres), compared to the 5 nautical miles (9.3 kilometres) visible from the conning tower of the U-boat. If the U-boat captain was forced to abandon it on the surface, the tether would be released and the Fa 330 would descend slowly to the water. Alternatively, the pilot could jettison the blades and towline. The jettisoned blades would pull a parachute from a canister and the pilot would ditch his seat before landing in the water.

When not in use, the Fa 330 was stowed in two 4 m (13 ft) long, watertight vertical canisters aft of the conning tower. One canister contained the blades and the tail, the other the fuselage. A third small horizontal canister contained the winch and cable. In calm weather and sea, the assembly and disassembly steps could each be completed in approximately four minutes. In heavier weather, recovering (winching the Fa 330 back to the deck), dismantling, and stowing the Fa 330 took approximately 20 minutes and was a difficult operation.

The pilot controlled pitch and roll with a stick and yaw was controlled by two foot pedals. The only instruments were a simple altimeter, airspeed indicator and tachometer. An interphone with a wire wrapped around the towing cable allowed the pilot to communicate with the U-boat.

Focke-Achgelis proposed a powered version of the Fa 330, the Fa 336, but the design never made it to the hardware phase.

== Operational history ==
In mid-1942 the first FA 330 were produced by Weser Flugzeugbau and were tested aboard U-523. Test results were excellent and the FA 330 was cleared for operational use in the beginning of 1943. By then however, Allied air cover and the large radar signature of the FA 330, were considered too much of a risk, only U-boats operating in the far southern parts of the Atlantic, the Indian Ocean and the Gulf of Aden could use the Fa 330. The FA 330 was used by the large Type IXD2 U-boats of the Monsun Gruppe. Despite its advantages, the use of the Fa 330 resulted in only a single sinking when U-177 used one to spot, intercept and sink the Greek steamer Efthalia Mari on 6 August 1943.

The Allies came into possession of an Fa 330 in May 1944 when they captured U-852 intact. After the war, the British government did successful experiments towing Fa 330s behind ships and jeeps, but the development of the helicopter quickly occupied the attention of the military.

U-boats that deployed Fa 330 kites included at least U-177, U-181, and U-852. Otto Giese wrote, "Our boat was rigged with a Bachstelze. This was a small, single, piloted helicopter attached to a 150 metre long steel cable and lifted into the air by the speed of the boat while the cable was gradually reeled out. From his position aloft, the pilot had a 360-degree view and could report any vessels." On U-181, the FA 330 broke down and was lost on its first attempt to fly.

In June 1944, U-862 used its FA 330 to navigate through Denmark Strait in thick fog. The FA 330 was able to lift above the fog and direct the U-boat to the Atlantic. The FA 330 was subsequently used in the Indian Ocean, but without result. On arrival at the German U-boat base in Penang, the FA 330 of U-862 and also the one from U-196 was bartered for a Japanese floatplane, to be used for liaison purposes at the German base. In September 1944 U-861 used its FA 330 during a patrol around Madagascar but on the one occasion when a ship was detected, the ship was able to make good its escape by the time the FA 330 was winched down.

== Legacy and influence ==
The Fa 330 directly inspired Igor Bensen's interest in small autogyros which culminated in the Bensen B-8 and other modern autogyros.

In February 2013, Aviation Week and Space Technology reported that L-3 Communications was testing its Valkyrie, an unpowered, tethered autogyro that weighs 210 pounds (95 kg), which is intended to serve as a cheap alternative to a shipborne helicopter. Valkyrie is designed to hover as high as 5,000 feet (1,500 meters) but is envisioned to operate typically at 500 to 1,000 feet (150 to 300 meters), offering a 28-to-39-mile (45-to-63-kilometre) field of view. L-3 stated that naval vessels could easily be retrofitted with this system.

== Surviving aircraft ==
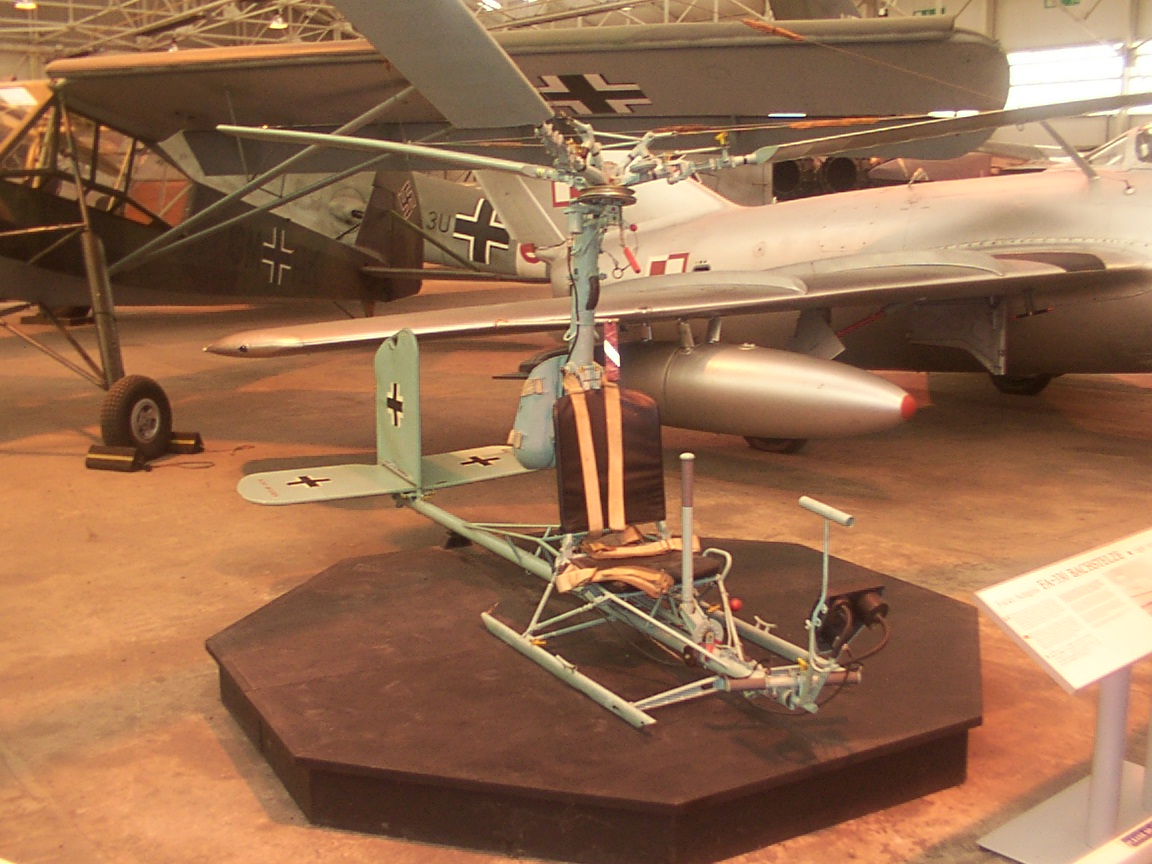
FA-330A-1 #100503 at Royal Air Force Museum Midlands

=== Denmark ===
- 100032 – On static display at Egeskov Castle in Kvaerndrup, Faaborg-Midtfyn.

=== France ===
- 100150 – On static display at the Le musée de l'Air et de l'Espace in Paris. This airframe was restored using parts from Wk. Nr. 100115 or Wk. Nr. 100145.

=== Germany ===
- 100042 – On static display at the Deutsches Museum in Munich.
- 100345 – On static display at the Deutsches Technikmuseum in Berlin.
- 100406 – On static display at the Hubschraubermuseum Bückeburg in Bückeburg.

=== United Kingdom ===
- 100143 – On static display at the Imperial War Museum Duxford in Duxford.
- 100503 – On static display at the Royal Air Force Museum Midlands in Cosford.
- 100509 – On static display at the Science Museum at Wroughton in Swindon.
- 100545 – On static display at the Fleet Air Arm Museum in Ilchester.
- 100549 – On static display at the Lashenden Air Warfare Museum in Ashford.

=== United States ===
- 60133 – On static display at the Steven F. Udvar-Hazy Center in Chantilly, Virginia.
- 100463 – On static display at the National Museum of the United States Air Force in Dayton, Ohio.

== Specifications ==
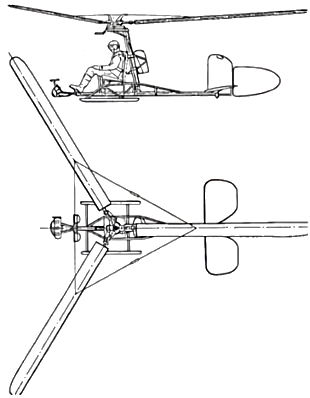
Drawing from U.S. recognition manual (very likely copy of German drawing)

Data from Aircraft of the Third Reich

General characteristics

- Crew: 1
- Length: 4.42 m (14 ft 6 in)
- Empty weight: 68 kg (150 lb)
- Max takeoff weight: 148 kg (326 lb)
- Main rotor diameter: 7.32 m (24 ft 0 in)
- Main rotor area: 42 m^{2} (450 sq ft) 3-bladed rotor

Performance

- Cruise speed: 40 km/h (25 mph, 22 kn) on tow
- Never exceed speed: 80 km/h (50 mph, 43 kn) on tow
- Minimum control speed: 27 km/h (17 mph, 15 kn) on tow

== See also ==
- Hafner Rotabuggy
- Man-lifting kite
- Petróczy-Kármán-Žurovec tethered helicopters

== Bibliography ==
- Munson, Kenneth (1978). German Aircraft Of World War 2 in colour. Poole, Dorsett, UK: Blandford Press. ISBN 0-7137-0860-3.
- Paterson, Lawrence (2016). Hitler's Grey Wolves : U-Boats in the Indian Ocean. Havertown: Frontline Books. ISBN 9781473882751.
