= Bensen B-12 =

B-12

General information
- Type: Experimental VTOL aircraft
- National origin: USA
- Manufacturer: Bensen Aircraft
- Designer: Igor Bensen
- Number built: 1

History
- First flight: 2 November 1961

The Bensen B-12, variously dubbed the Sky-Way or Sky-Mat was an unconventional multirotor developed by Igor Bensen in the United States in the late 1950s. Extremely unorthodox, the design sprang from Bensen's thinking about the engine redundancy necessary to ensure the safe operation of small, personal rotorcraft operating at low altitudes and slow speeds. The result was a broad aluminum framework supporting an array of ten engines and rotors that Bensen likened to a "magic carpet". The design was later refined to include eight rotors, each driven by two engines for a total of sixteen.

Successfully flown in 1961 at altitudes up to 20 ft (6 m), Bensen felt that the approach had potential for military heavy-lift or agricultural applications, but nothing further came of it.

== Specifications ==
General characteristics

- Crew: 1 pilot
- Powerplant: 10 × McCulloch Mc75 go-kart engines , 9 hp (7 kW) each
- Main rotor diameter: 10 × 7 ft 0 in (2.10 m)

Performance

- Service ceiling: 20 ft (6.0 m)
