= Hafner Rotachute =

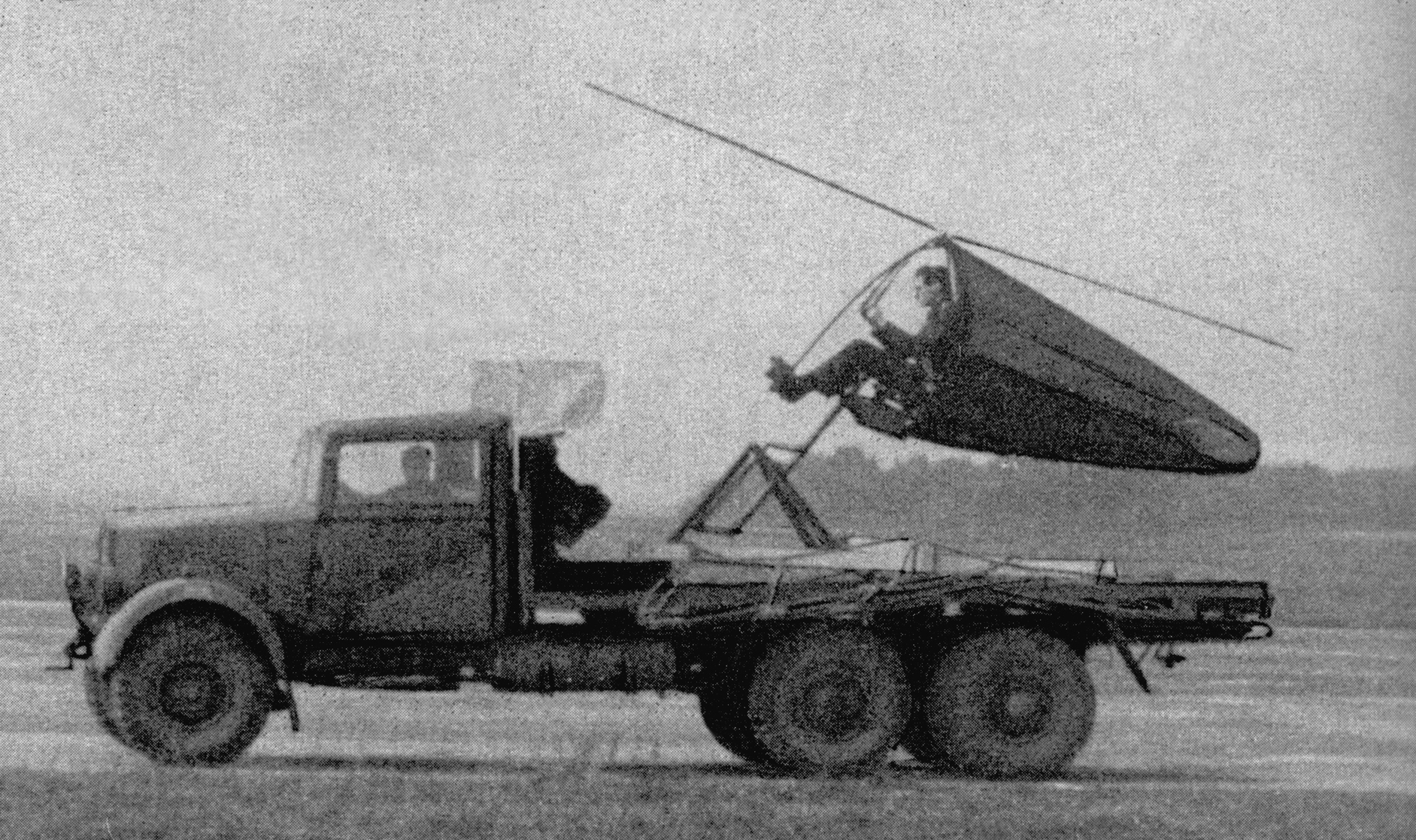
- Ground test of a Rotachute III at Ringway, 1942

General information
- Type: manned rotor kite
- National origin: UK
- Designer: Raoul Hafner
- Number built: c. 8

History
- Manufactured: 1942
- First flight: 1942

The Hafner H.8 Rotachute was a British 1940s experimental one-man rotor kite designed by Raoul Hafner.

== Background ==
The Rotachute was the eventual development of a concept devised by Raoul Hafner, an Austrian engineer who specialised in rotary wing design, and who had moved to the UK in 1933 to continue his research and development work. In 1940, he proposed the use of a single-place strap-on rotor kite in place of a conventional parachute, to deliver a soldier accurately to a battlefield. The proposal was made to the Air Ministry in the light of a shortage of silk for parachute manufacture. Hafner was briefly interned as an alien, but was released to pursue the feasibility of the idea at the Central Landing Establishment (CLE) located at RAF Ringway. In October 1940, work began on design and construction of rotor systems and scale models of rotor kites. The first models were made of wood and fabric, ballasted to represent a pilot, and had a rotor span of about 3 ft (0.91 m). They were tested successfully by hand launching, but suffered buffeting and lack of autorotation when launched from aircraft at height. The third evolution, designated "M.3", had metal rotor blades, and after further modifications made the first successful launch and descent from a De Havilland Tiger Moth. Further developments and tests continued into February 1941. The tenth evolution scale model (M.10) had mass-balanced wooden rotors, ballast of 100 lb (45.3 kg), and a rotor span of 10 ft (3.05 m). On 14 March 1941, the M.10 model was successfully air-launched from a Boulton & Paul Overstrand.

== Design and development ==
The design of the man-carrying machine known as a Rotachute, also known as a Hafner H.8, evolved from November 1940 and throughout 1941. In September 1941, the Central Landing Establishment was renamed the Airborne Forces Establishment. The Rotachute Mark I design initially comprised a tubular steel framework with a single seat, rubber-mounted rotor hub, hanging control column, skid undercarriage, and a self-inflating rear fairing made of rubberised fabric with integral tailplane. The two rotor blades, of wooden construction, could achieve flapping and coning characteristics via hinges on the rotor hub. Fixed footrests were provided, plus fittings below the seat to accommodate a soldier's weapon, such as a Bren gun. The control column offered two-axis control, rolling and pitching, with turns made via controlled rolling movement. Air Ministry Specification No. 11/42 was issued retrospectively to describe the outline requirements. The Ministry of Aircraft Production sub-contracted construction of parts to specialist firms including F. Hills and Sons, Airwork General Trading, Dynaflex, Dunlop, and H. Morris & Co. Some full size rotor trials were carried out using a pivoting rig mounted on a Ford flatbed truck, and full-size unmanned airframes were used in ground-based and inflight trials.

== Operational history ==
In January 1942, trials of the Rotachute Mark I were conducted to assess the aerodynamic characteristics while on the truck-mounted rig, with pilot control of the aircraft in forward motion. On 11 February 1942, the prototype Rotachute was first manually flown from a wheeled trolley while under tow behind a Humber car at Ringway, after starting the rotor by hand. The pilot was Flt Lt I.M. Little, who had experience flying Avro/Cierva C.30 Rota autogiros on radar calibration duties; he was later awarded the Air Force Cross (UK). On that and on a subsequent trial, the machine rolled over after landing, sustaining damage to the blades but not to the pilot. A tethered test beneath a barrage balloon and a longer test flight at RAF Snaith were both more successful. The flexible tail section evidently offered inadequate directional stability, and the consequence was the Rotachute Mark II, that had a longer tail section braced with wooden formers, plus two landing wheels mounted below the centre of gravity.

On 15 February 1942, the unit was again reorganised, to form the Airborne Forces Experimental Establishment (AFEE), still based at Ringway. The rotary wing section of AFEE continued to conduct tests on longer runways during detachments at RAF Snaith and RAF Chelveston. On 29 May 1942, the first flight of the Rotachute Mark II was achieved while under tow behind a Jeep, and several more towed flights were also successful. Meanwhile, the Mark III had been produced, with a tail section comprising a wooden framework covered in doped linen fabric plus a rigid tailplane. Starting on 2 June 1942, the Rotachute Mark III was flown at heights up to 100 ft (30.5 m) while under tow behind a Jeep, with tow rope lengths up to 300 ft (91.4 m). From 9 June, successful inflight releases and landings were achieved while under tow.

From 17 June 1942, a Rotachute Mark III was air-towed behind a Tiger Moth on a 300 ft (91.4 m) tow line. After two towed flights, the Rotachute was released at an altitude of 200 ft (61 m) and made the first manned free flight and controlled landing. Further free flights were made from altitudes up to 3,900 ft (1,189 m). On 1 July 1942, AFEE moved its main base from Ringway to RAF Sherburn-in-Elmet. Additional directional stability was achieved in the Rotachute Mark IV, that introduced endplates onto the rigid tailplanes.

Although the Rotachute concept had proved to be practical, the operational requirement for such a machine never materialised. About eight Rotachutes were constructed, most being progressively converted to Mark III and then to Mark IV specifications. They continued to be flown in ground-based and inflight trials until late 1943, to help research flight characteristics for a follow-on project, the Hafner Rotabuggy, an air-towed land vehicle with autogiro capabilities.

== Surviving aircraft ==
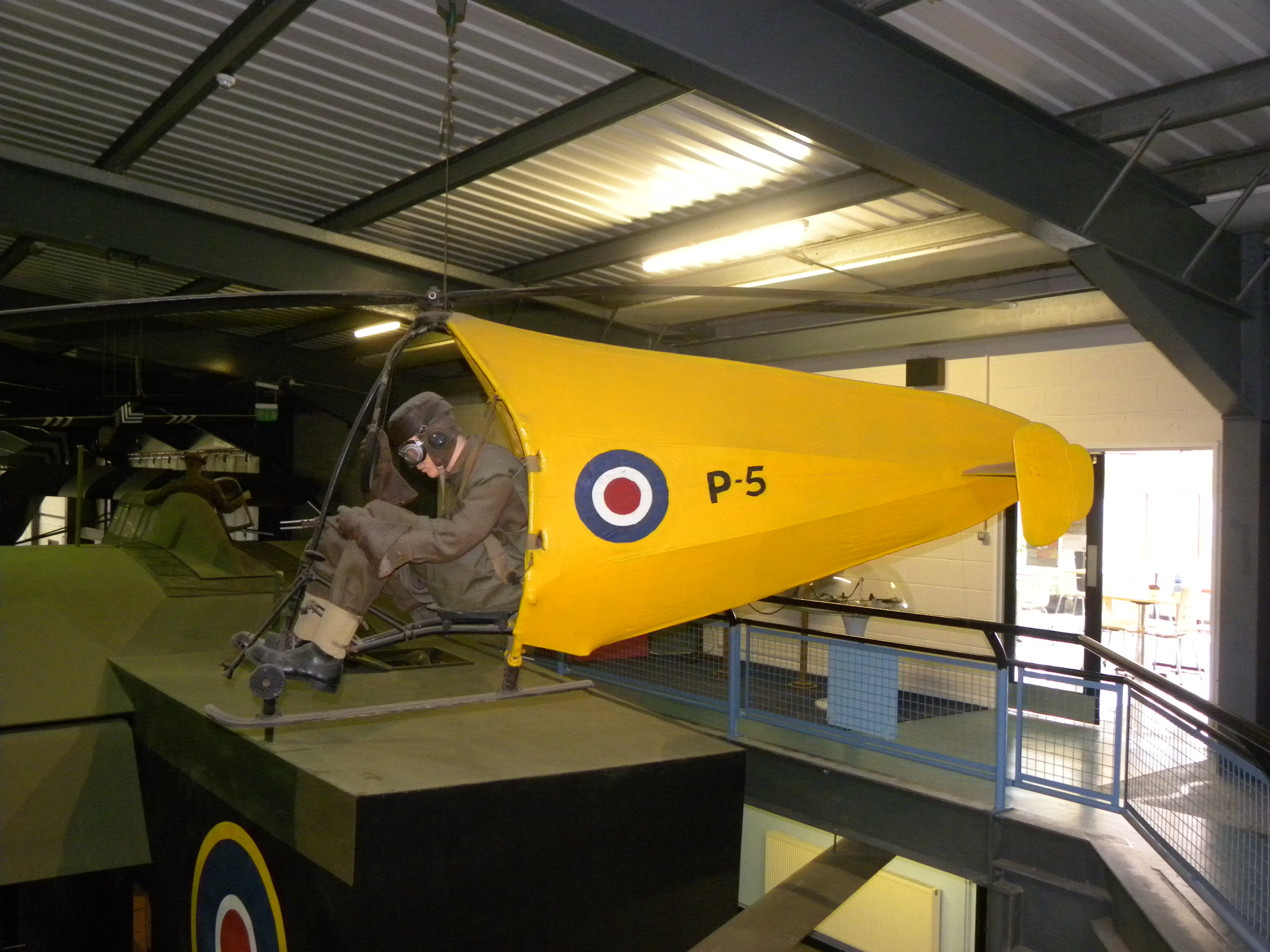

The fifth aircraft (P-5) was a Rotachute Mark III, converted in 1943 to the Mark IV configuration, and is displayed at the Museum of Army Flying, Middle Wallop, in England.

== Specifications (Rotachute Mk III) ==
Data from Jarrett 1991

General characteristics

- Crew: 1
- Length: 10 ft 0 in (3.05 m)
- Height: 5 ft 0 in (1.52 m)
- Empty weight: 76 lb (34.5 kg)
- Gross weight: 295 lb (133.8 kg)
- Main rotor diameter: 15 ft 0 in (4.57 m)
- Main rotor area: 177 sq ft (16.44 m^{2})

Performance

- Maximum speed: 108 mph (173.8 km/h, 94 kn)

== See also ==
- Focke-Achgelis Fa 330

== Bibliography ==
- Sturtivant, Ray. 1995. British Prototype Aircraft. Haynes ISBN 1856482219
- Jarrett, Philip. "Nothing Ventured ... Part 17". Aeroplane Monthly, August 1991, pp. 470–476
