= Bristol Sycamore =

British helicopter, 1947–1959

Type 171 Sycamore
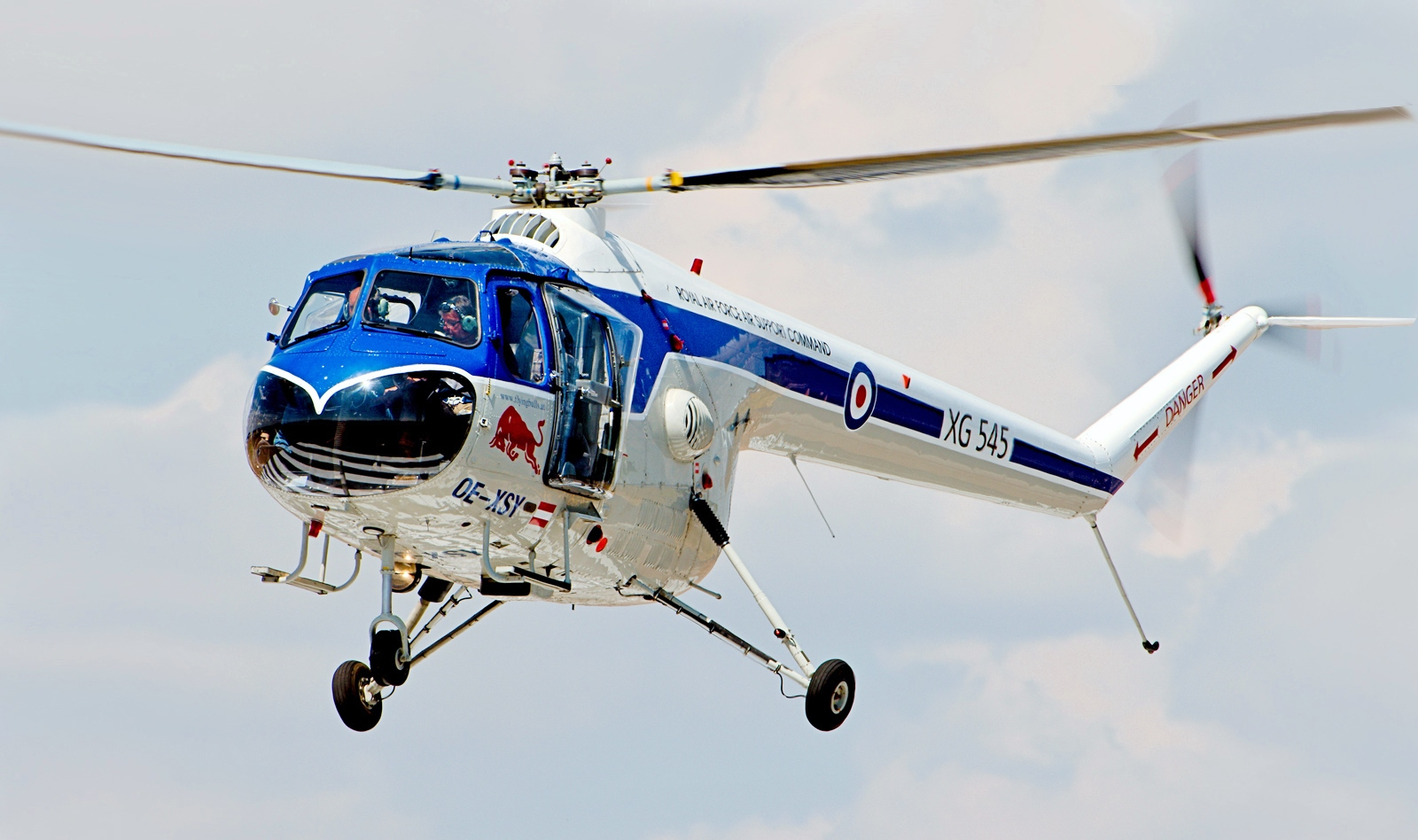
- A restored Sycamore flying during RIAT 2019.

General information
- Type: Rescue and Anti-Submarine Helicopter
- National origin: United Kingdom
- Manufacturer: Bristol Aeroplane Company
- Designer: Raoul Hafner
- Primary users: Royal Air Force Royal Australian Navy; German Army
- Number built: 180

History
- Manufactured: 1947–1959
- Introduction date: 1953
- First flight: 27 July 1947

The Bristol Type 171 Sycamore is an early helicopter developed and built by the helicopter division of the Bristol Aeroplane Company. The name refers to the seeds of the sycamore tree, Acer pseudoplatanus, which fall with a rotating motion. It has the distinction of being the first British helicopter to receive a certificate of airworthiness, as well as being the first British-designed helicopter to be introduced by and to serve with the Royal Air Force (RAF).

Typically capable of seating up to three passengers, the type was often used as a transport for both passengers and cargo alike. In RAF service, the Sycamore was normally used in the search and rescue and casualty evacuation roles. The type proved the value of rotorcraft to easily traverse inhospitable or otherwise inaccessible terrain; the Sycamore made valuable contributions to British military activities during the Malayan Emergency, the Cyprus Emergency, and the Aden Emergency, in addition to other operations.

In addition to its British military service, various models of the Sycamore were produced and operated by a number of users, including overseas military operations and civil customers. Civilian operations typically involved transportation, mountain rescue, and aerial survey work. In 1959, production of the Sycamore ended after 180 rotorcraft had been completed.

== Development ==
During the Second World War, new methods of aircraft propulsion were devised and experimented with; in particular, breakthroughs in rotary aircraft, such as gyrocopters and helicopters, were making such aircraft more practical. In 1944, Bristol established a specialised helicopter division shortly after the Allied invasion of Europe, when engineers from the Airborne Forces Experimental Establishment (AFEE) at Beaulieu became available. The AFEE had been conducting its own work on the development of rotorcraft designs under the noted helicopter pioneer Raoul Hafner; however, the successful use of Airspeed Horsa and General Aircraft Hamilcar gliders during Operation Overlord had led to helicopter development being recognised as a priority. Hafner, whose company had been acquired by Bristol was promptly appointed by the company as the head of Bristol's new helicopter division.

In June 1944, work commenced on the development on a four-seat helicopter intended for both civil and military use; it was out of this programme that the Sycamore would emerge. During development, particular emphasis was assigned to the producing the necessary level of endurance of the rotorcraft's mechanical components. On 25 July 1947, the first prototype, VL958, which was powered by a 450-horsepower (340 kW) Pratt & Whitney Wasp Junior (there being no suitable engine in the Bristol range), performed the type's maiden flight. In mid-1948, the third prototype, which had been built to the improved Sycamore Mk.2 standard, was completed; this model had been fitted with a 550-horsepower (410 kW) Alvis Leonides engine, the Leonides engine would become the standard powerplant for all subsequent Sycamore production. On 25 April 1949, a certificate of airworthiness was granted for the Sycamore, the first such to be granted to a British helicopter.

During the flight test programme, Bristol's key development pilots for the Type 171 included Charles "Sox" Hosegood and Col. Robert "Bob" Smith. In 1951, a Bristol-owned Sycamore Mk.2 was used during a series of deck landing trials performed on board the Royal Navy aircraft carrier HMS Triumph. An improved model of the helicopter, designated as the Sycamore Mk.3, was rapidly developed; it featured an increased capacity for five occupants, a wider fuselage and a shortened nose. A total of 23 Sycamore Mk.3s were produced, 15 of these were principally used for joint evaluation purposes by the Royal Air Force (RAF), Army Air Corps (AAC), and British European Airways (BEA).

Versions of the Sycamore up to and including the Mk.3A retained the standard two-seat cockpit layout, placing the pilot in the left-hand seat and the co-pilot in the right. However, on the main production model, designated Sycamore Mk.4, this seating arrangement was switched to the American practice of positioning the pilot's seat on the right. There were also a number of other developments that had featured upon the earlier versions, such as a four-door design, which had been standardised upon the Sycamore Mk.4. This version entered RAF service, receiving the military designation of HR.14.

Civil versions were not marketed under the Sycamore name, they were instead known simply as the Bristol Type 171. By May 1958, over 150 Sycamores had been manufactured and four units per month were being built.

== Design ==
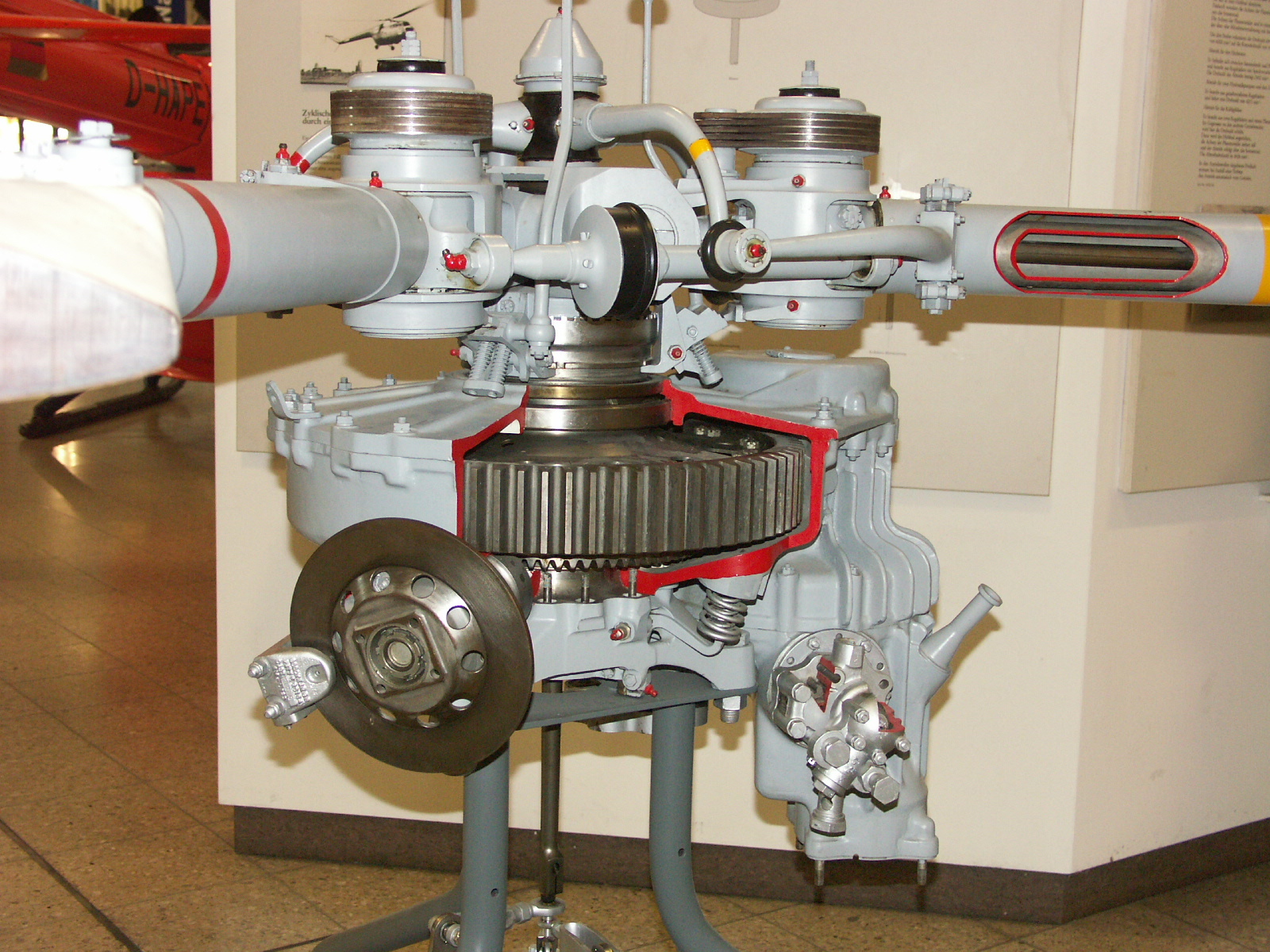
A sectioned Sycamore main gearbox, displayed in the Deutsches Museum, Munich, Germany

The Bristol Sycamore was one of the first production helicopters to be developed. Each Sycamore was manufactured with all of the necessary fixed fittings to enable it to be quickly adapted for any of six major roles: search and rescue, air ambulance, passenger transport, freight transport, aerial crane and dual instruction; it was also used for other specialised roles. The Sycamore seated four-to-five occupants, depending on the model; it was usually fitted with three folding canvas seats as well as a single rotating seat besides the pilot. In addition to the passenger cabin, it had a separate luggage compartment.

A specialised air ambulance model of the Sycamore was developed during the early 1950s. In this configuration, up to two patients were carried inside the cabin on stretchers stacked one above the other; this was different to the usual arrangement of the era of using externally-mounted "pods" for carrying patients. To provide the extra width necessary in the cabin, detachable Perspex blisters were fitted on each side of the cabin. The stretcher racks could be folded into the sides of the cabin, providing room for up to three sitting casualties instead; an electrical supply outlet was available for connecting electric blankets. Next to the pilot was a swivelling seat for a medical attendant.

The blades of the three-bladed main rotor were attached to the rotor head with lightweight interleaving steel plates while tie-rods carried the centrifugal tension loads. The blade levers were connected using ball joints to the arms of a control spider, the cone of which was actuated up and down by the collective pitch lever which changed the pitch of all the blades; an irreversible mechanism was used to prevent blade loads being transferred back to the control stick. The blades were supported when stationary or turning slowly by droop stops, which maintained a minimum clearance between the blade tips and the tailboom even in high winds; these stops were withdrawn above 100 rpm so that full freedom of movement for effective flight was possible.

The Sycamore was powered by a single Alvis Leonides piston engine of 550 hp (410 kW). The engine was mounted below and to the rear of the main rotor on a flexible mounting to reduce vibrations transmitted to the helicopter structure. It was isolated in a fireproof enclosure which was fitted with fire detection and extinguishing equipment to meet certification requirements. Air was drawn through a forward-facing grill to cool the gearbox before passing through the engine cowling and leaving the fuselage. The engine power was controlled by the collective pitch lever. In order to maintain the rotor speed at its required setting fuel to the engine had to be automatically varied as the rotor pitch setting commanded by the pilot changed the load on the engine; fine adjustment of engine power was achieved by twisting the pitch lever. The Sycamore had a relatively high rotor speed for the era, which was claimed to give a smoother ride and be safer in the event of engine failure.

== Operational history ==
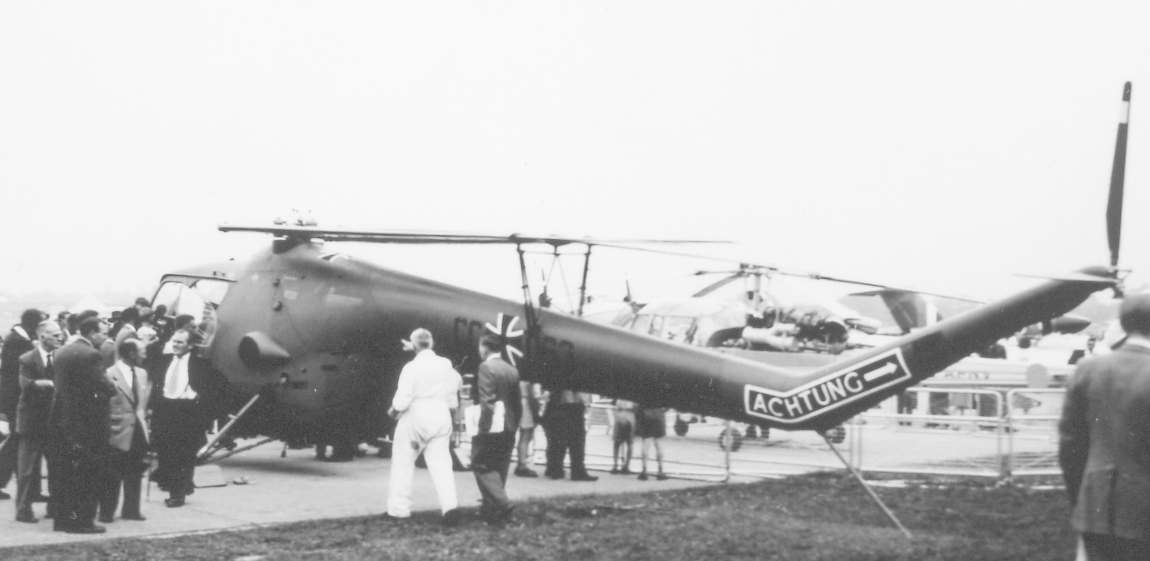
A West German air force Sycamore Mk.14 at the 1958 Farnborough Air Show

From 1952 to 1955 the Sycamore was used for various trials by the Air-Sea Warfare Development Unit RAF which was stationed at RAF St. Mawgan. In April 1953, the Sycamore HR14 entered service with No. 275 Squadron of the RAF and went on to serve with nine squadrons in total. Various marks of Sycamore served with the RAF; they would primarily be used as air ambulances ( Sycamore HC.10 ), for Army communications ( Sycamore HC.11 ) and for search and rescue operations (Sycamore HR.12 to Sycamore HR.14). In 1953, No. 275 Squadron, equipped with Sycamores, became the RAF's first helicopter search and rescue squadron in Great Britain. The type was used by the RAF Central Flying School for pilot training purposes. In June 1953, a Sycamore towing a large RAF Ensign led a flypast by 640 British and Commonwealth aircraft at the Coronation Review of the RAF.

The Sycamore was heavily used during the Malayan Emergency (1948–1960), typically deploying Army foot patrols into the jungle. Numerous Sycamores were transferred to the Far East Air Force to participate in the conflict; however, the type was involved in a number of crashes in the region which had occurred as a result of tail or main rotor blade problems. In response, a series of blade trials were conducted prior to a modified blade design being adopted and Sycamore operations in the theatre being resumed. Following the end of most combat operations in August 1960, Sycamores remained in the region, including a detachment in Brunei, to support British forces stationed there to deter further aggression by Malayan communist guerrillas.

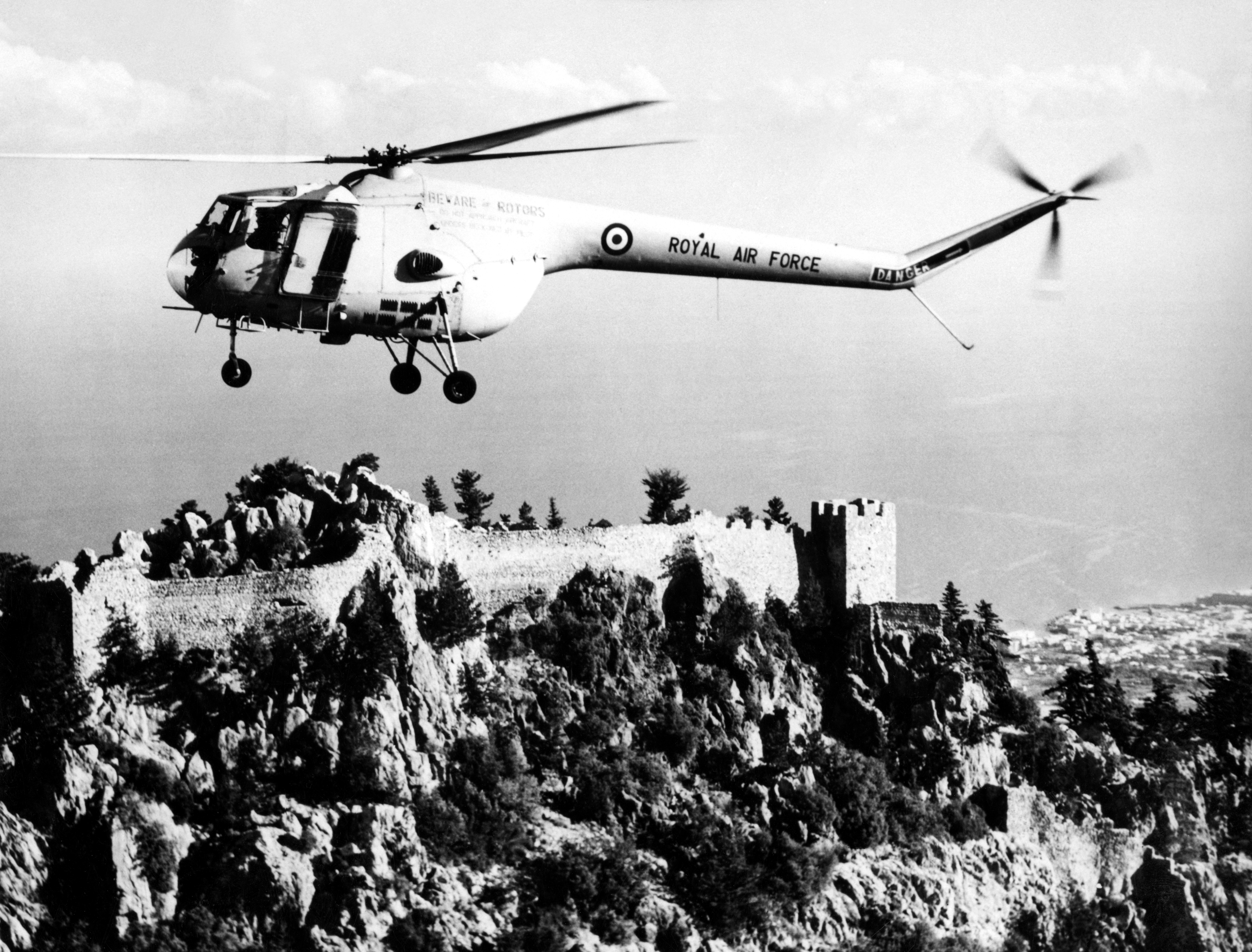
Sycamore of 103 Squadron RAF in Cyprus, 1961

The type also saw combat service with the RAF during the Cyprus Emergency and the Aden Emergency, in addition to other operations. In December 1971, the last of the RAF's Sycamores were officially retired; this had been due to critical parts having reached the end of their fatigue life. However 32 Squadron continued to operate two Sycamores until August 1972.

Fifty Sycamores were delivered to the German Federal Government. Three helicopters were produced for the Belgian Government for use in the Belgian Congo; it had been picked due to the type's good capabilities in tropical environments, as proven during its combat use in Malaysia. The Sycamore was the second helicopter type to be used by the Australian Defence Force; ten were delivered to the Royal Australian Navy.

The Sycamore was also used in a variety of civilian roles. A single example was used during the construction of the M1 motorway between London and Leeds; the type provided support in various roles, including to perform aerial surveying, communication across various sites, the carriage of both personnel and equipment, and the mitigation of flooding on the project. Sycamores operated by Australian National Airways were routinely available for charter, performing tasks such as the aerial surveying of mining claims, supply missions, and the transporting of equipment across the remote Outback areas of the nation.

== Variants ==
=== Type 171 ===
Mk 1
Prototype; two built.
Mk 2
Second prototype; one built.
Mk 3
Production model with five seats in a widened fuselage, with a shortened nose to improve visibility. 23 built, including Mk 3A.
Mk 3A
Civilian version with additional freight hold, two built for British European Airways.
Mk 4
This was the main production model and similar to the military version called Sycamore with a more powerful engine. 154 built.

=== Sycamore ===
Sycamore HC.10
(=Mk.3) one built for evaluation by the Army Air Corps as an air ambulance.
Sycamore HC.11
(=Mk.3) four built for evaluation by the Army Air Corps, as communications aircraft.
Sycamore HR.12
(=Mk.3A) four built for the RAF for evaluation as search and rescue aircraft.
Sycamore HR.13
(=Mk.3A) two built with rescue winches for the RAF for evaluation as search and rescue aircraft.
Sycamore HR.14
(=Mk.4) 85 built for the RAF, as search and rescue aircraft.
Sycamore Mk.14
three built for the Belgian Air Force, for use in the Belgian Congo.
Sycamore Mk.50
three built for the Royal Australian Navy, for search and rescue, and plane guard duties.
Sycamore HC.51
seven built for the Royal Australian Navy, for search and rescue, and plane guard duties.
Sycamore Mk.52
50 built for the German Air Force and Navy.

== Operators ==
=== Civil operators ===
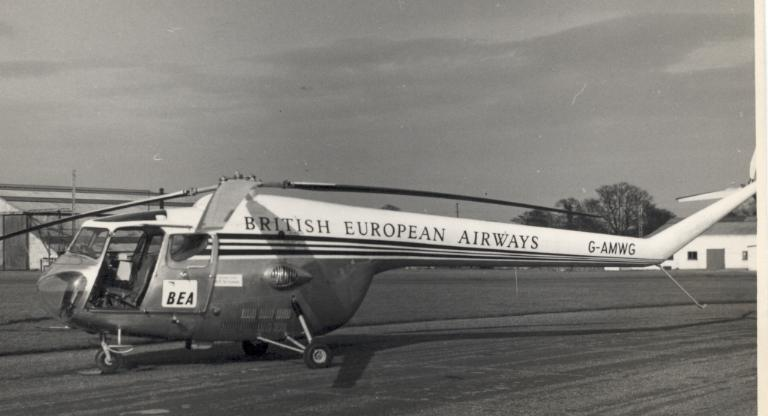
British European Airways Bristol 171 Mk 3A at London Gatwick on the scheduled passenger service from Birmingham in 1955

United Kingdom

- British European Airways

Australia

- Australian National Airways/Ansett-ANA
- Jayrow Helicopters

Austria

- Flying Bulls In 2013 the Flying Bulls by Red Bull reinstated one Sycamore

=== Military operators ===
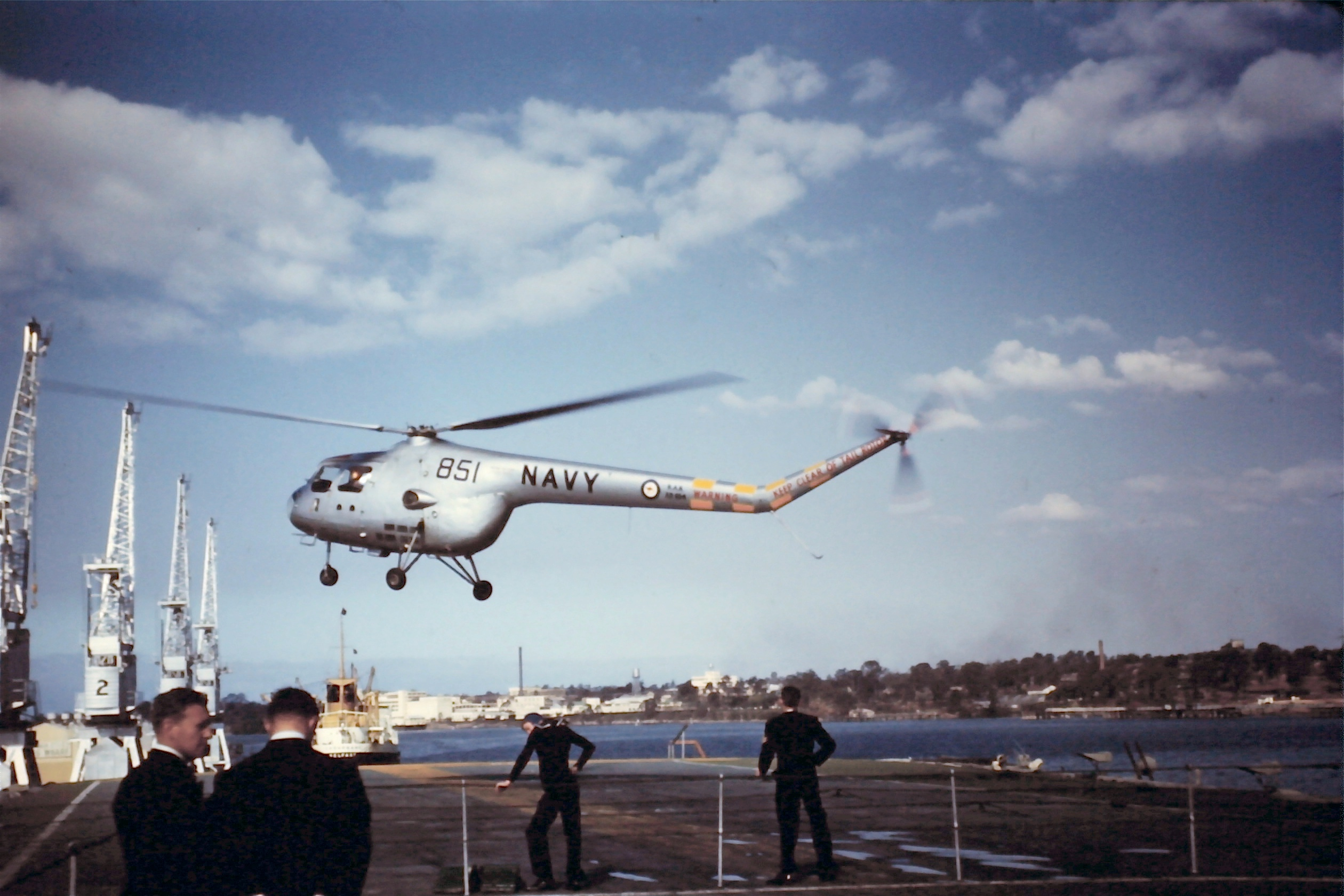
Bristol 171 Sycamore in Royal Australian Navy service around 1960 taking off from the flight deck of HMAS Melbourne.

Australia

- Royal Australian Air Force – Only two Sycamores were in service with the RAAF from 1951 to 1965. The two helicopters were used for general support duties at the Woomera Rocket Range in South Australia.
  - Aircraft Research and Development Unit
  - No. 1 Air Trials unit
- Royal Australian Navy
  - 723 Squadron RAN
  - 724 Squadron RAN

Belgium

- Belgian Air Force: Belgium used three Mk.14B's (registered as B1/OT-ZKA, B2/OT-ZKB & B3/OT-ZKC) to equip the metropolitan power in the Congo with a rescue flight based at Kamina Air Base, Katanga Province. Used between 1954 and 1960.

Germany

- Luftwaffe
- German Navy

United Kingdom

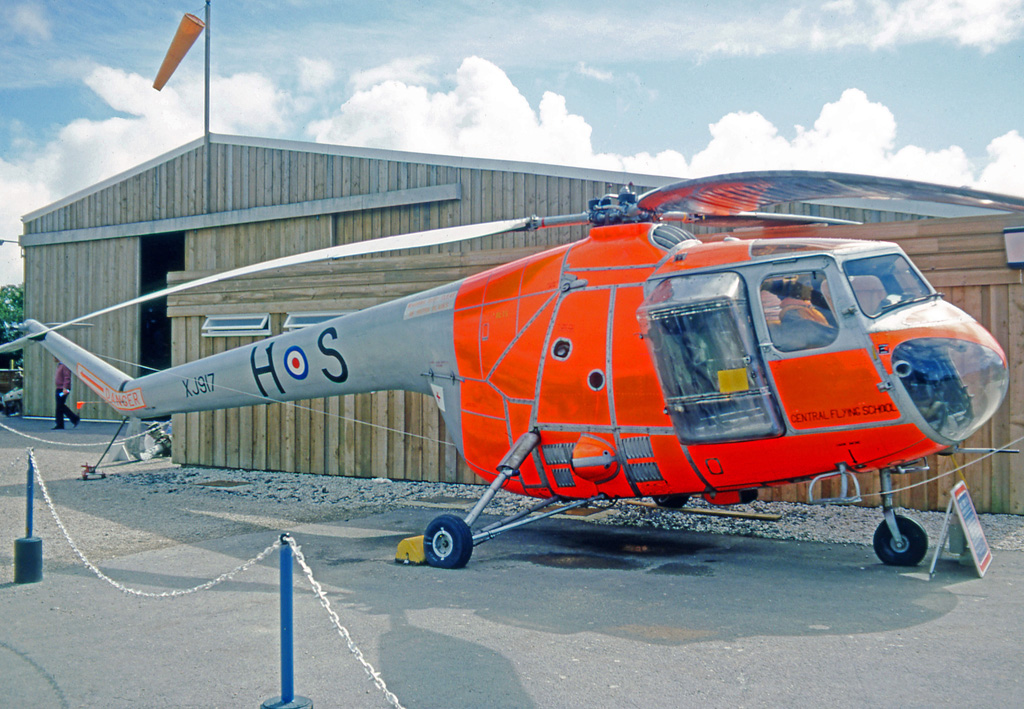
Sycamore HR.14 of the Royal Air Force Central Flying School (1977)

- Royal Air Force
  - Air-Sea Warfare Development Unit
  - Central Flying School
  - 22 Squadron
  - 32 Squadron
  - 84 Squadron
  - 103 Squadron
  - 110 Squadron
  - 118 Squadron
  - 194 Squadron
  - 225 Squadron
  - 228 Squadron
  - 275 Squadron
  - 284 Squadron
  - 651 Squadron
  - 657 Squadron
  - No. 1563 (Helicopter) Flight RAF
- Army Air Corps

== Surviving aircraft ==
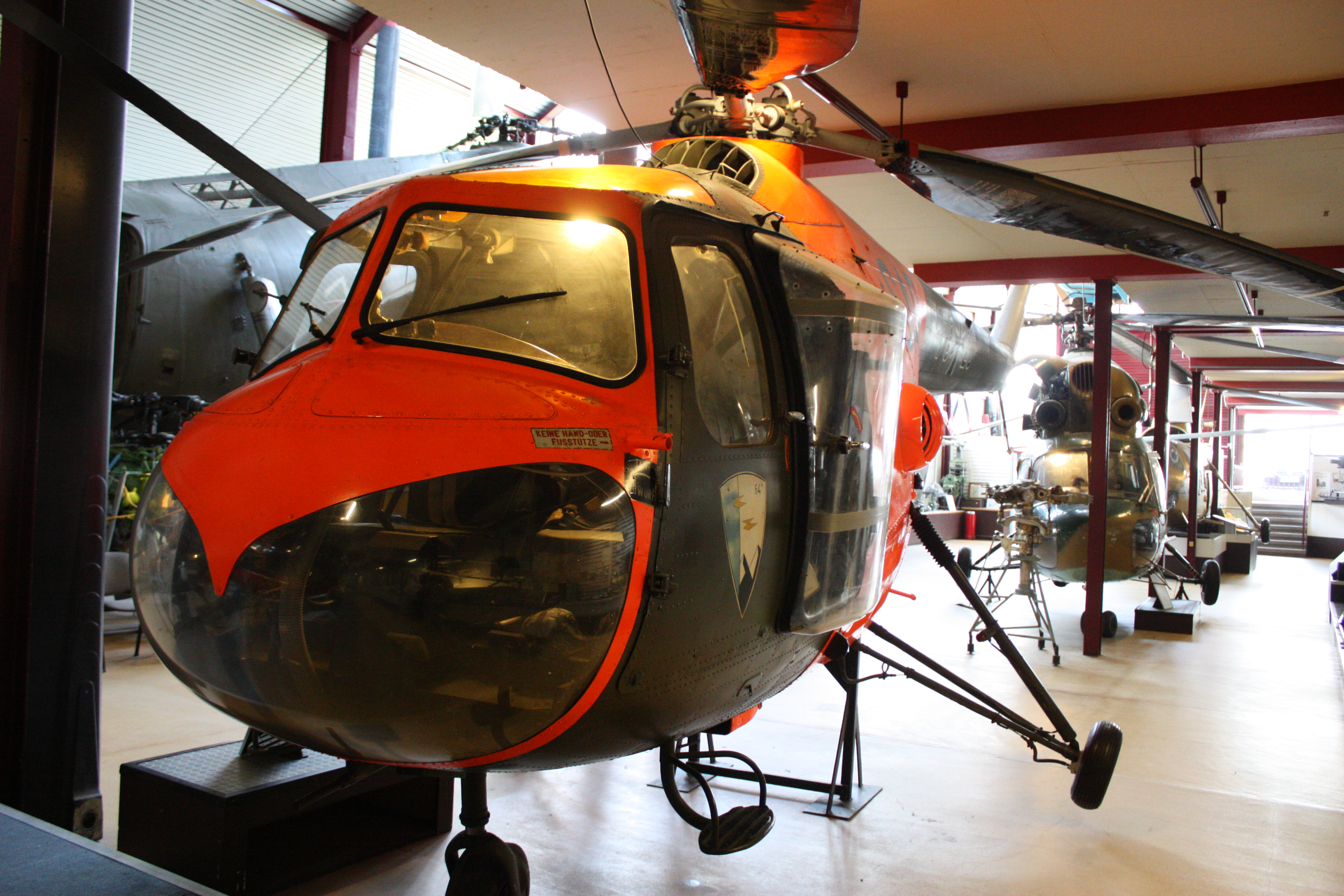
A German Sycamore on display at Hubschraubermuseum Bückeburg in 2010

=== Australia ===
On display

- Australian Fleet Air Arm Museum in Nowra

Stored or under restoration

- Sycamore A91-1, former RAAF, at the Australian National Aviation Museum in Moorabbin, Victoria

=== Austria ===
Airworthy

- Sycamore HR.52 OE-XSY – Red Bull

stored, on display for special events

- Waste Watchers Kehr Force One of MA48 (Vienna department for waste collection) trainee centre

stored and used for technical training

- Bundesfachschule für Flugtechnik, Langenlebarn, ex D-HFUM

=== Belgium ===
On display

- Sycamore HR.14 XG547 of the Royal Air Force at Royal Museum of the Armed Forces and Military History in Brussels

=== Germany ===
On display

- Sycamore HR.52 78+20 of the German Army at Hubschraubermuseum Bückeburg
- Sycamore HR.52 LC 105 Search and Rescue medical evacuation helicopter at former RAF Ahlhorn

=== United Kingdom ===
On display

- Sycamore 3 G-ALSX – The Helicopter Museum in Weston-super-Mare
- Sycamore 3 WA576 – Dumfries and Galloway Aviation Museum, Dumfries.
- Sycamore 3 WA577 – North East Aircraft Museum, Sunderland.
- Sycamore 3 WT933 – Newark Air Museum, Newark.
- Sycamore HR.12 WV781 – Caernarfon Airport Airworld Museum, Caernarfon
- Sycamore HR.12 WV787 – RAF Museum London.
- Sycamore HR.14 XG502 – Museum of Army Flying, Middle Wallop, Hampshire.
- Sycamore HR.14 XG518 – Norfolk and Suffolk Aviation Museum, Flixton.
- Sycamore HR.14 XJ380 – Boscombe Down Aviation Collection, Old Sarum.
- Sycamore HR.14 XJ918 – Royal Air Force Museum Midlands, RAF Cosford. This aircraft saw active service during the Malayan Emergency and was one of the last four Sycamores to be officially retired from RAF service in 1971. XJ918 was relocated to the RAF Museum Cosford in 1983. Relocated to Ulster Aviation Society in late 2022.
- Sycamore HR.14 XL824 – Aerospace Bristol, Filton.
- Sycamore HR.14 XL829 – The Helicopter Museum in Weston-super-Mare
- Sycamore HR.14 XE317 – South Yorkshire Aircraft Museum, Doncaster.

Stored or under restoration

- Sycamore HR.14 XJ917 – Aerospace Bristol, Filton.

== Specifications (Mk.4 / HR14) ==
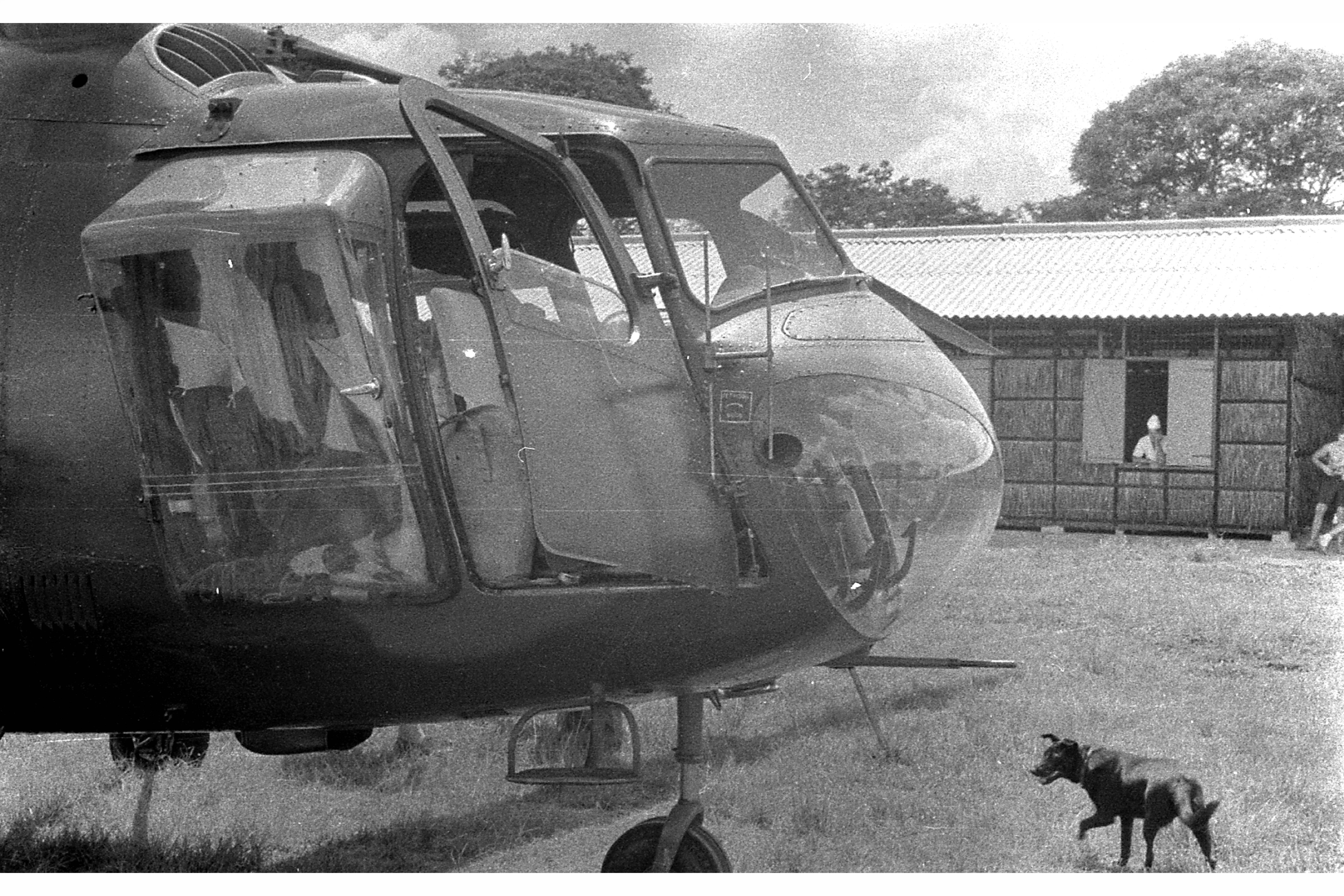
Forward section of the Bristol Sycamore

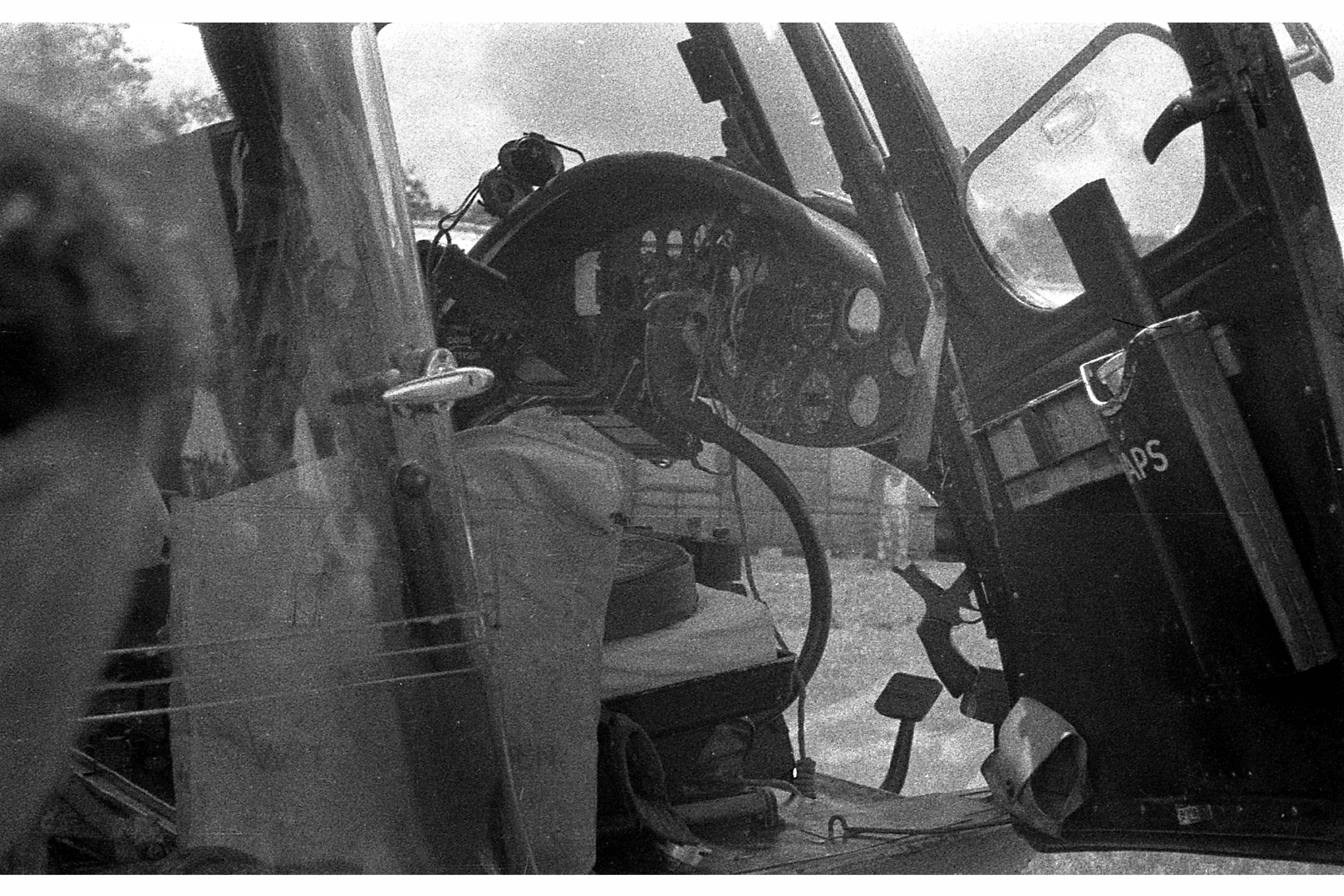
The interior of a Sycamore

Data from

General characteristics

- Crew: two
- Capacity: accommodation for three passengers
  - Payload: 1,000 lb (454 kg)
- Length: 61 ft 1.3 in (18.62 m)
- Height: 13 ft 10.6 in (4.23 m)
- Empty weight: 3,810 lb (1,728 kg)
- Gross weight: 5,600 lb (2,540 kg)
- Powerplant: 1 × Alvis Leonides piston engine, 550 hp (410 kW)
- Main rotor diameter: 48 ft 7 in (14.8 m)

Performance

- Maximum speed: 132 mph (212 km/h, 115 kn)
- Range: 330 mi (531 km, 290 nmi)
- Endurance: 3½ hours

== See also ==
Aircraft of comparable role, configuration, and era

- H-5 Dragonfly
- Westland Dragonfly
- Mil Mi-1

Related lists

- List of aircraft of the Royal Air Force
