= Rotor kite =

Unpowered rotary wing aircraft or kite

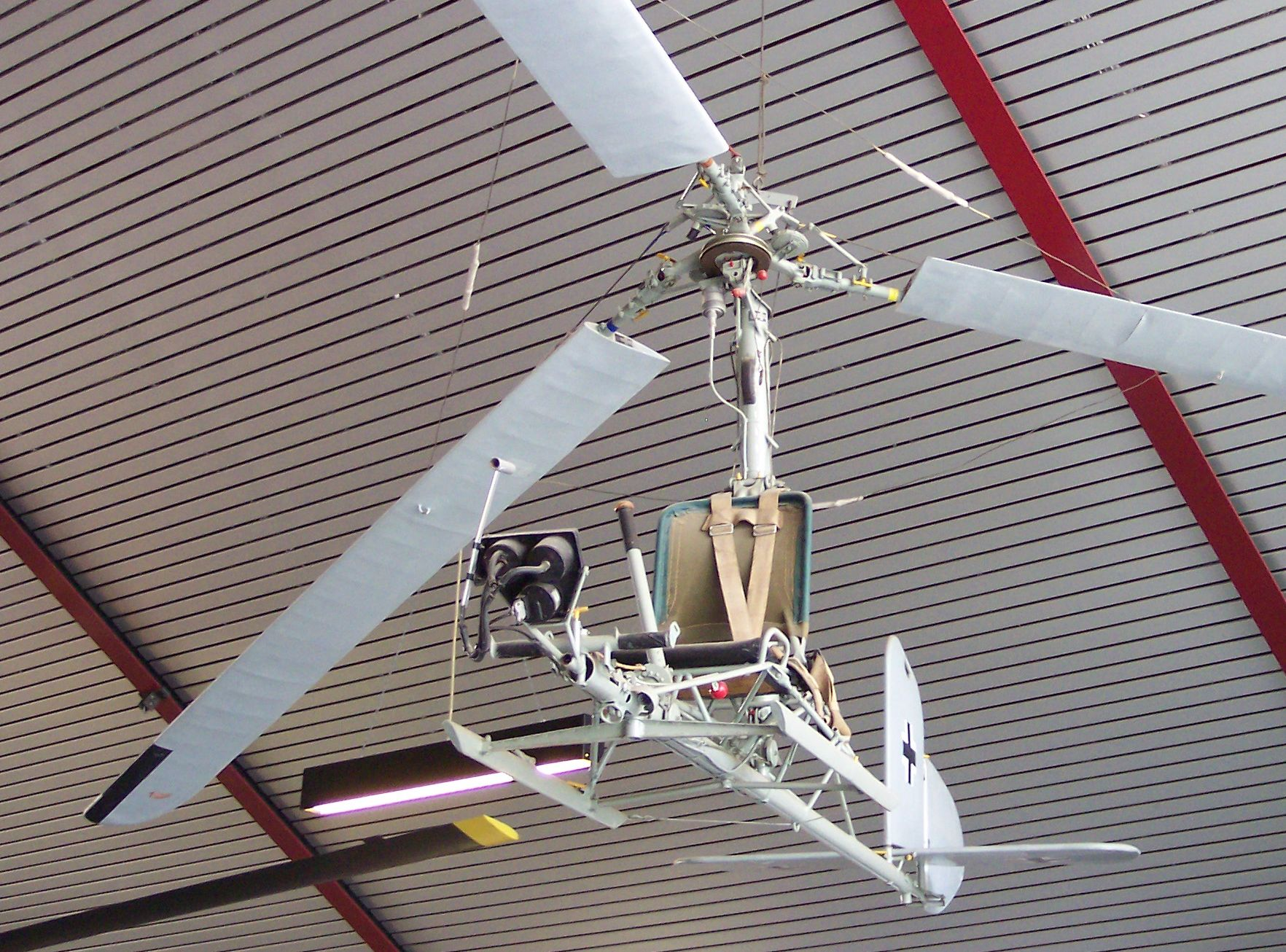
A Focke-Achgelis Fa 330 rotor kite

A rotor kite or gyrokite is an unpowered, rotary-wing aircraft. Like an autogyro or helicopter, it relies on lift created by one or more sets of rotors in order to fly. Unlike a helicopter, gyrokites and rotor kites do not have an engine powering their rotors, but while an autogyro has an engine providing forward thrust that keeps the rotor turning, a rotor kite has no engine at all, and relies on either being carried aloft and dropped from another aircraft, or by being towed into the air behind a car or boat or by use of ambient winds for the kiting. As of 2009, no country in the world requires a license to pilot such a craft.

== History ==
- Thomas Ansboro of Glasgow, Scotland patented an autorotating-winged rotor kite in 1891.
- Walter Van Wie filed a patent for a Revolving Kite in 1909 claiming "certain new and useful Improvements" in revolving kites"
- 1933: Filed: July 11, 1933. US2074327 by De Courcy and Schwarz for Kite.
- 1936: Filed: Aug 1, 1936. US2181477 by Carl B. Chupp for Aerial Device.

Research into rotor kites or gyrokites was deepened during World War II, and one type in particular, the Focke Achgelis Fa 330, reached active service, being towed behind German U-boats as an aerial observation platform. In the United Kingdom, Raoul Hafner designed the Rotachute as a means of deploying paratroops, and a larger version, the Rotabuggy, was trialled as a means of air-dropping a jeep, but neither of these aircraft progressed past the experimental stage. Plans to similarly equip a tank never left the drawing board.

During the 1950s, rotor kites were developed as recreational aircraft, largely due to the efforts of Dr. Igor Bensen in the United States, whose Bensen Aircraft Corporation produced a series of such aircraft, dubbed "gyrogliders" by Bensen. These were marketed as plans or kits for building at home, beginning with the B-5 and culminating with the B-8 by the end of the decade. The Bensen designs became so ubiquitous that the term "gyroglider" is sometimes used to refer to any rotor kite, regardless of manufacturer. In the 1960s, a B-8 gyroglider was evaluated by the United States Air Force as a "Discretionary Descent Vehicle", to provide a more controllable alternative than a parachute for a pilot ejecting from a stricken aircraft.

== Manned rotor kites ==
- Bensen Aircraft Corporation
  - Bensen B-5
  - Bensen B-6
  - Bensen B-7
- A person from Russia named Shumeyko built and flew a gyro hang glider in the 1990s.
- Stephan Nitsch designed and built a manned rotor kite hang glider; he used the term "Autogiro" for the rotor kite hang glider.
- Focke-Achgelis Fa 330
- Hafner Rotachute
- Hafner Rotabuggy

== Unmanned rotor-kites ==
- Sky Chopper
- Sky Windpower

== See also ==
- Kite types

| | Aerostat | Aerodyne | | |
| | Lift: Lighter than air gas | Lift: Fixed wing | Lift: Unpowered rotor | Lift: Powered rotor |
|---|---|---|---|---|
| Unpowered free flight | (Free) balloon | Glider | Helicopter, etc. in autorotation | (None – see note 2) |
| Tethered (static or towed) | Tethered balloon | Kite | Rotor kite | (None – see note 2) |
| Powered | Airship | Airplane, ornithopter, etc. | Autogyro | Gyrodyne, helicopter |
