= Bensen Aircraft =

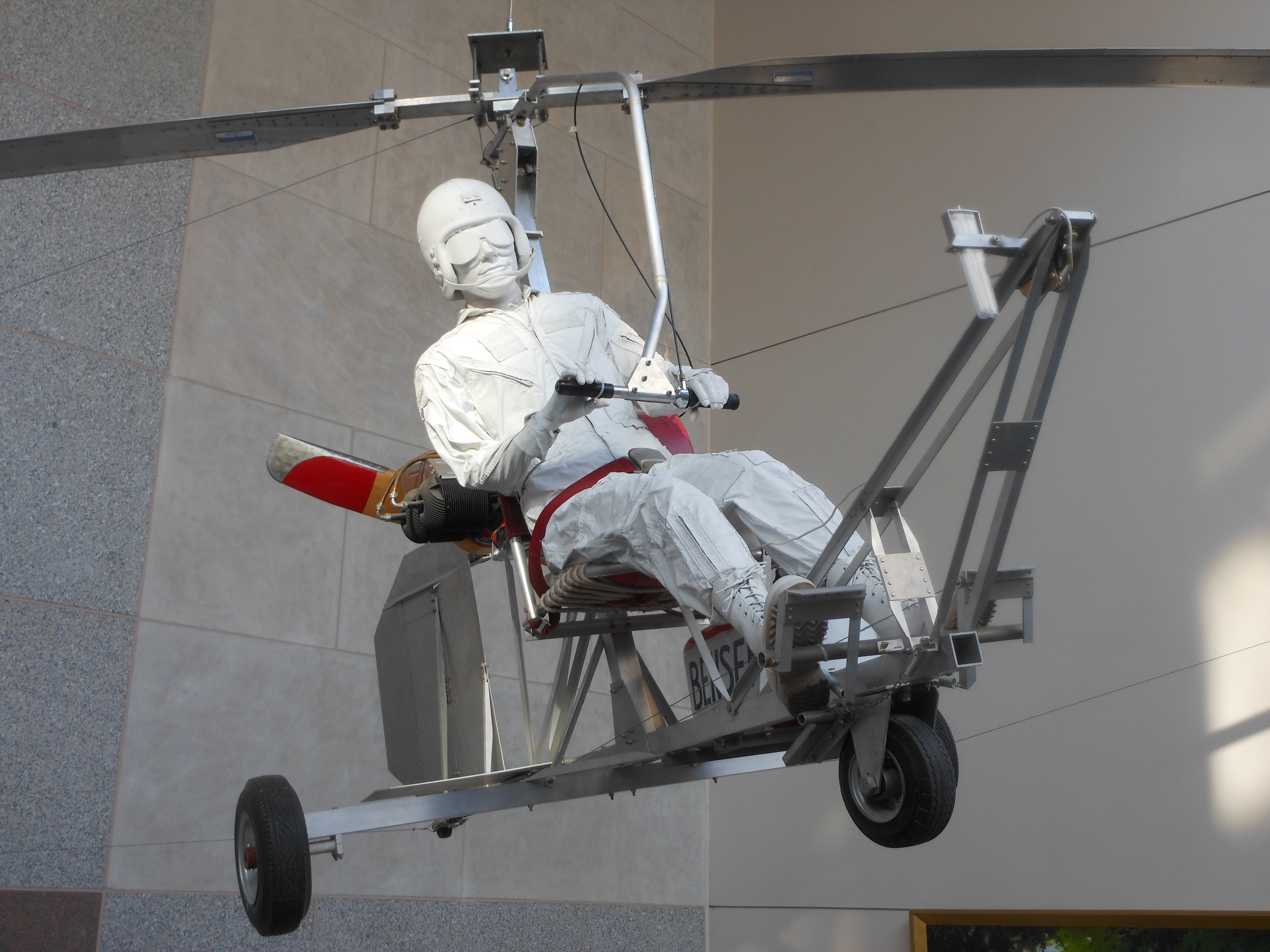
- Company type: Private company
- Industry: Aerospace
- Founded: 1952
- Founder: Igor Bensen
- Defunct: 1987
- Fate: Closed
- Headquarters: Raleigh, North Carolina, United States

The Bensen Aircraft Corporation was established by Dr. Igor Bensen at Raleigh-Durham International Airport in North Carolina in 1952 to develop and market a variety of helicopters and autogyros of Bensen's own design.

== History ==
Their most successful product was the Bensen B-8, which first flew in 1955 and remained in production until the company closed down in 1987.

== Aircraft ==
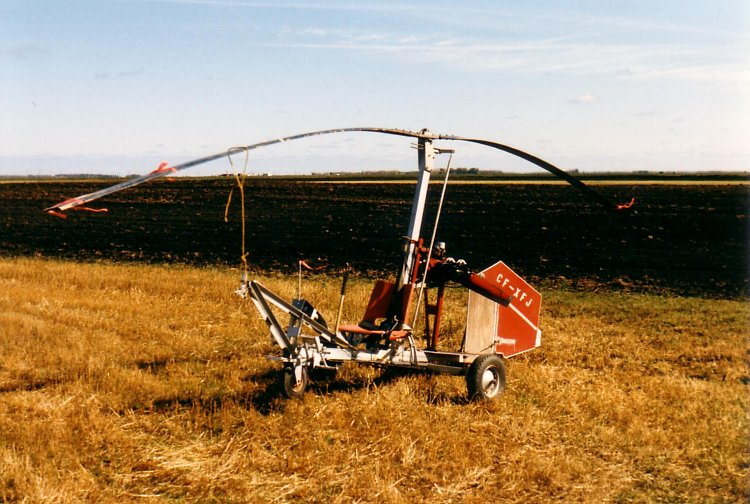
Bensen B-8M

Model name	First flight	Number built	Type
Bensen B-5	1953		Rotor kite
Bensen B-6	1953		Rotor kite
Bensen B-7	1955		Rotor kite
Bensen B-8	1955		Autogyro
Bensen B-9	1958		Helicopter
Bensen B-10	1958	1	Experimental VTOL aircraft
Bensen B-11			Autogyro
Bensen B-12	1961	1	Experimental VTOL aircraft
Bensen B-13	1963		
Bensen Mid-Jet	1953	1	Experimental helicopter
Bensen X-25	1968	2	Experimental autogyro

== See also ==
- Gyrocopter
- Gyroglider
