= Bensen Mid-Jet =

Mid-Jet

General information
- Type: Experimental helicopter
- National origin: United States
- Manufacturer: Bensen Aircraft
- Designer: Igor Bensen
- Number built: 1

History
- First flight: 1953

The Bensen Mid-Jet (a pun on "Midget jet") was a small helicopter developed by Igor Bensen in the United States in the early 1950s in the hope of attracting the interest of the United States Navy. It was a single-seat, open framework machine based on the B-5 rotor kite with small, gasoline- or fuel oil-burning ramjets mounted as tipjets on the rotor blades. Tests carried out in 1954 showed it to be able to lift four times its own weight and cruise at 75 mph (120 km/h).

== Specifications ==
General characteristics

- Crew: One pilot
- Height: 5 ft 4 in (1.63 m)
- Empty weight: 100 lb (45 kg)
- Gross weight: 500 lb (227 kg)
- Powerplant: 2 × ramjets , equivalent to 20 hp (15 kW) each
- Main rotor diameter: 15 ft 0 in (4.57 m)
- Main rotor area: 176 sq ft (16.4 m^{2})

Performance

- Cruise speed: 75 mph (120 km/h, 65 kn)

== See also ==
Aircraft of comparable role, configuration, and era

- Gyrodyne RON
- Hiller ROE
