= Bensen B-8 =

Small, single-seat autogyro

B-8
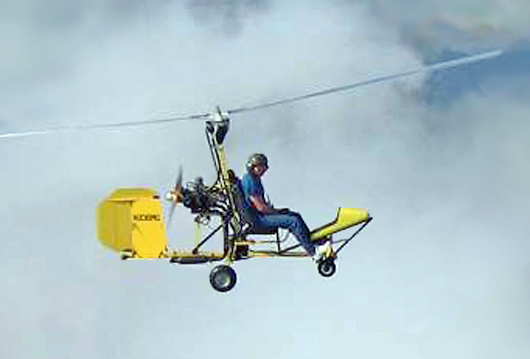

General information
- Type: Recreational autogyro
- National origin: United States
- Manufacturer: Bensen or homebuilt
- Designer: Igor Bensen

History
- First flight: 6 December 1955

The Bensen B-8 is a small, single-seat autogyro developed in the United States in the 1950s. Although the original manufacturer stopped production in 1987, plans for homebuilders are still available as of 2025. Its design was a refinement of the Bensen B-7, and like that aircraft, the B-8 was initially built as an unpowered rotor-kite. It first flew in this form in 1955, and on 6 December a powered version, designated B-8M (M for motorised) first flew. The design proved to be extremely popular and long-lasting, with thousands of sets of plans sold over the next thirty years.

== Design and development ==
The B-8's design is extremely minimalist, with not much more to the aircraft than a pilot's seat, a single tailfin, a rotor, and (in powered versions) the powerplant. In May 1968 a B-8 and B-8M were studied by the USAF under the Discretionary Descent Vehicle (DDV) program as the X-25B and X-25A respectively. In this scheme, it was proposed to integrate combat aircraft ejection seats with a small autogyro or rotor kite to allow downed pilots more control over their post-ejection landing spot. The X-25A and X-25B were used to evaluate the piloting and training requirements of the autogyros. No full-scale operational tests were ever performed. The U.S. Air Force stopped funding the DDV program with the end of the Vietnam War.

One B-8M, named Spirit of Kitty Hawk (registration N2588B) was used to make a special commemorative flight exactly duplicating the first flight of the Wright brothers' original Flyer on the sixtieth anniversary of the occasion. This same aircraft was flown by Igor Bensen himself between May 1967 and June 1968 to set twelve world and US speed, distance, and altitude records for autogyros, the largest number of such records to be held by any non-military rotorcraft.

== Variants ==
- B-8 Gyro-Glider - unpowered rotor-kite intended to be towed behind a car
- B-8B Hydro-Boat - B-8 with a full boat hull intended to be towed behind another boat
- B-8M Gyro-Copter - standard motorised version, main production type. Usually powered by a McCulloch 4318 engine
  - B-8MH Hover-Gyro - twin, coaxial rotor design with powered lower rotor and autorotating upper rotor, giving it the capability of hovering. Upper rotor and drive propeller powered by separate engines
  - B-8MJ Gyro-Copter - B-8M modified for "jump" take off by a small second engine providing power to rotor head with anti-torque provided by rudder correction under power.
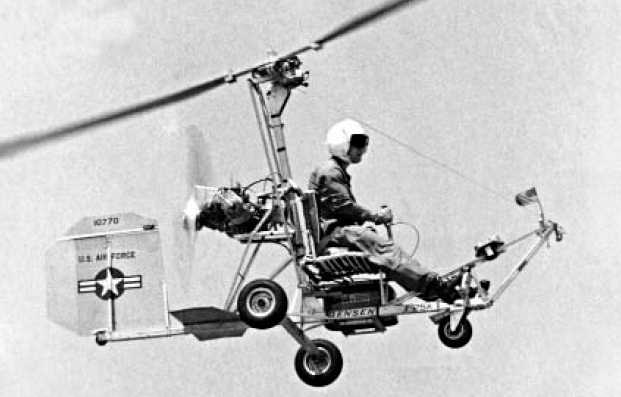
    X-25A 68-10770 in flight
  - B-8MW Hydro Copter - float-equipped B-8M
  - X-25A - B-8M evaluated by USAF. Single example (serial 68-10770) first flown 5 June 1968 and preserved at the National Museum of the United States Air Force at Wright-Patterson Air Force Base
- B-8 Super Bug - similar to B-8M but with extra engine to spin up rotor before take-off
  - B-8HD Super Gyro-Copter - development of Super Bug first flown in 1979 with hydraulic drive to pre-rotate rotor rather than separate engine
- B-8V - B-8 powered by a Volkswagen air-cooled engine
- B-8W Hydro-Glider - float-equipped B-8 intended to be towed behind a boat
- X-25B - B-8 evaluated by USAF. Single example (serial 68-10771) first flown 23 January 1968 and preserved at the AFFTC Museum at Edwards Air Force Base.
- Rotorcraft Minicopter Mk 1 - South African variant with pre-rotator and cockpit fairing.
- Aeroflyte DGH-1 - 70 hp (52 kW) license-built model from Aeroflyte.

== Aircraft on display ==
- US Southwest Soaring Museum
- New England Air Museum
- North Carolina Museum of History
- South Yorkshire Aircraft Museum, Doncaster

== Specifications (Typical B-8M, standard rotor) ==
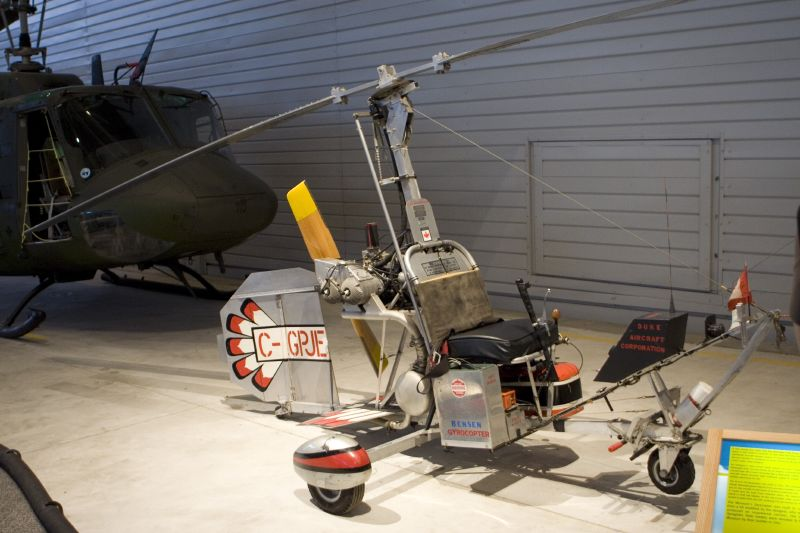
Bensen B-8M Gyrocopter at the Canada Aviation Museum

Data from Jane's All The World's Aircraft 1982–83

General characteristics

- Crew: 1
- Length: 11 ft 4 in (3.45 m)
- Height: 6 ft 3 in (1.91 m)
- Empty weight: 247 lb (112 kg)
- Max takeoff weight: 500 lb (227 kg)
- Fuel capacity: 6 US gal (5.0 imp gal; 22.7 L) or 9.7 US gal (8.1 imp gal; 36.7 L) in a combined seat/fuel tank, with provision for an auxiliary tank for ferrying
- Powerplant: 1 × McCulloch Model 4318AX 4-cylinder air-cooled 2-stroke horizontally-opposed piston engine, 72 hp (54 kW)
- Main rotor diameter: 20 ft 0 in (6.10 m)
- Main rotor area: 314.2 sq ft (29.19 m^{2})
- Blade section: Bensen G2
- Propellers: 2-bladed Aero Prop Model BA 48-A2fixed-pitch pusher propeller, 4 ft 0 in (1.22 m) diameter

Performance

- Maximum speed: 85 mph (137 km/h, 74 kn)
- Cruise speed: 60 mph (97 km/h, 52 kn) maximum

45 mph (39 kn; 72 km/h) economical

- Minimum speed: 15 mph (13 kn; 24 km/h)
- Take-off speed: 20 mph (17 kn; 32 km/h)
- Landing speed: 7 mph (6 kn; 11 km/h)
- Range: 100 mi (160 km, 87 nmi)
- Ferry range: 300 mi (480 km, 260 nmi) with auxiliary fuel tank
- Endurance: 1 hour 30 minutes
- Service ceiling: 12,500 ft (3,800 m)
- Rate of climb: 1,000 ft/min (5.1 m/s)
- Take-off run: 300 ft (91 m)
- Landing run: 0 ft (0 m) in 9 kn (10.4 mph; 16.7 km/h) wind
- Landing run: 20 ft (6 m) in nil wind

== See also ==
Aircraft of comparable role, configuration, and era

- Brock KB-2
- Midwest Hornet
- Taggart GyroBee
- Wallis WA-116 Agile

Related lists

- List of experimental aircraft
