= Army Flying Museum =

Aviation museum in England

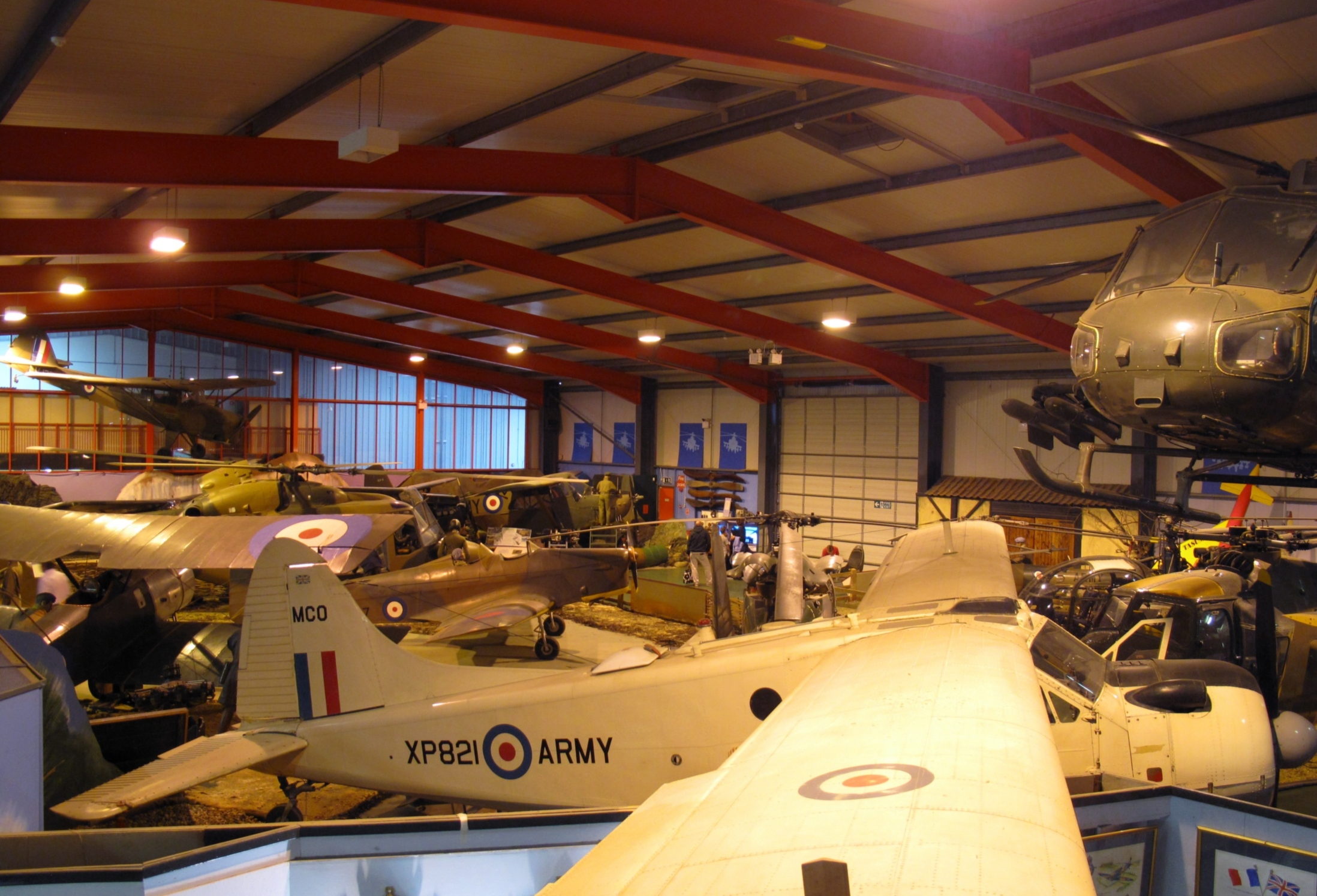
- One of the museum's galleries

- Location within Hampshire
- Established: 1987
- Location: Middle Wallop, Hampshire, England
- Coordinates: 51.1502°N 1.5726°W
- Type: Aviation museum
- Website: www.armyflying.com

The Army Flying Museum, previously known as the Museum of Army Flying, is a British military aviation museum about the history of flying in the British Army. It is located at Middle Wallop Flying Station, close to Andover in Hampshire, England.

== Remit ==
The Army Flying Museum covers the history of Army aviation from the Balloon sections of the Royal Engineers, through the establishment of the Royal Flying Corps in 1912 and air observation post (AOP) squadrons, and the establishment of the Army Air Corps in 1957 from the merger of the Glider Pilot Regiment and the AOP Squadrons. It contains flight simulators, an outdoor play park with interactive aviation themed play pieces, and a control tower based on that at Middle Wallop.

The museum raised funds for 'Project Eagle', a two-phase development program. Phase 1, which was completed on 1 September 2017, is a memorial to more than 5,000 personnel who died in the service of British Army Flying from early pioneers to the modern Army Air Corps. Phase 2, from November 2018 to April 2019, instituted a Heritage Lottery Fund supported £2.59 million refurbishment. In addition to capital improvements, an activity plan was instituted to operate until summer 2021, to included community and volunteer activities, training and education.

== Displays ==
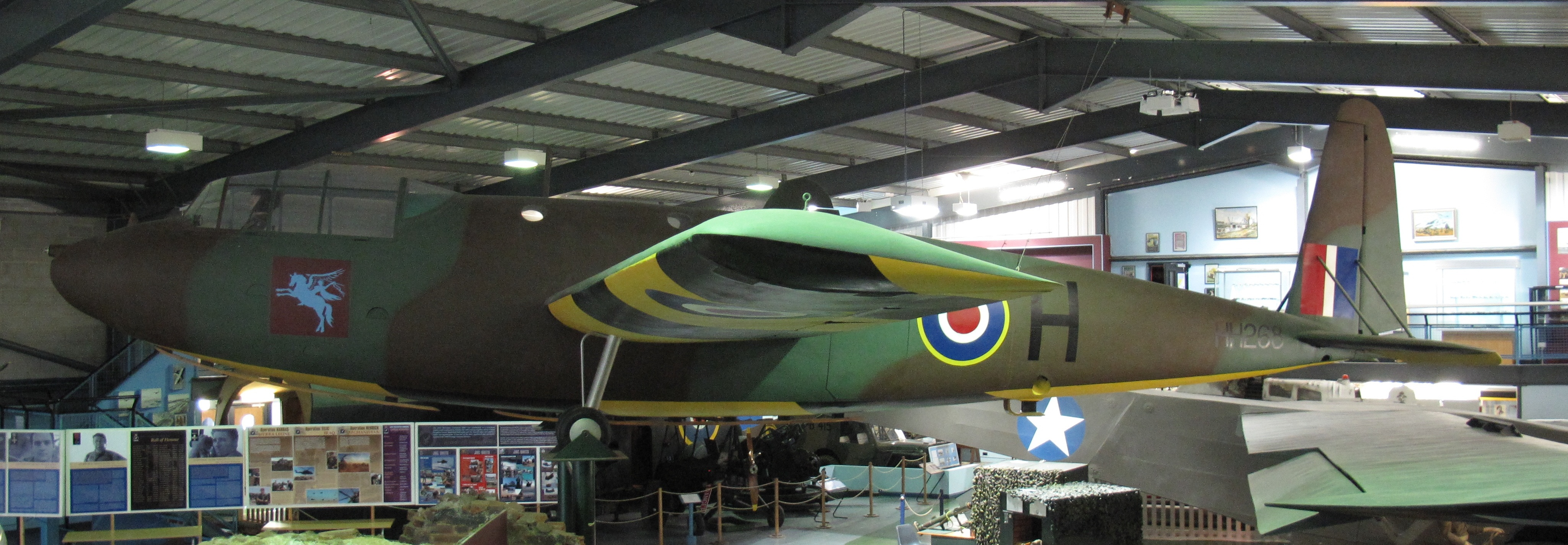
General Aircraft Hotspur glider

The collection of aircraft includes fixed wing and rotary aircraft. These include a restored Westland Lynx serial XX153 that was used to set two former world helicopter speed records in 1972, and an Aérospatiale Gazelle, Westland Scout, Westland Lynx, Bristol Sycamore, the Saunders-Roe Skeeter, and a replica of the rotabuggy.

The exhibit of military gliders of the Glider Pilot Regiment includes the Airspeed Horsa and Waco CG-4.

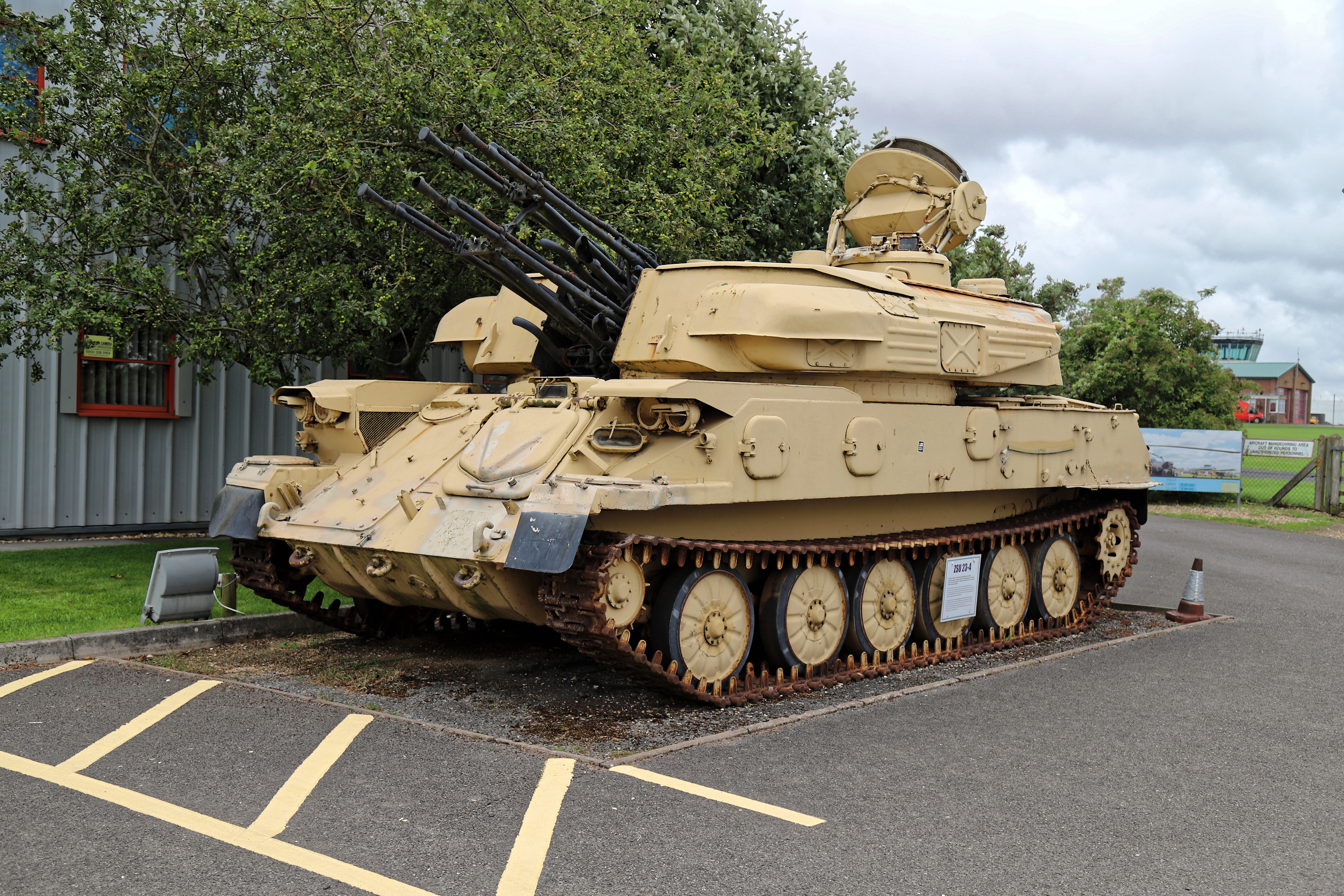
ZSU-23-4

The museum has an example of the Soviet ZSU-23-4 Shilka, captured from the Iraqi Army during the first Gulf War; the Shilka is a self-propelled, radar guided anti-aircraft weapon used during the Cold War.

=== Fixed wing ===
- Airspeed Horsa
- Taylorcraft Auster V
- Auster AOP.6
- Auster AOP.9
- Britten-Norman Islander AL.1 ZG993
- Cessna O-1 Bird Dog – United States Army
- de Havilland Canada DHC-1 Chipmunk
- de Havilland Canada DHC-2 Beaver
- General Aircraft Hamilcar
- General Aircraft Hotspur
- Miles Magister
- Sopwith Pup
- Waco Hadrian - United States Army
- Prospector EP.9

=== Rotorcraft ===
- Aérospatiale Alouette II - XR232
- AgustaWestland Apache AH.1 - ZJ224 - only one on display in the UK
- Agusta A109A - ZE410
- Bristol Sycamore HR.14 - XG502
- Bell 47G-4 - G-AXKS
- Bell AH-1 Cobra – 70-15990 United States Army
- Agusta-Bell Sioux AH.1 - XT108
- Bell UH-1 Iroquois – Former Argentine Army AE-409 captured in 1982
- Rotabuggy
- Saunders-Roe Skeeter AOP.12 - XL813
- Westland Gazelle AH.1 - ZA737
- Westland Lynx AH.1 - XX153
- Westland Lynx AH.7 - XZ675
- Westland Scout AH.1 - XP847
