= Hafner Rotabuggy =

British experimental aircraft

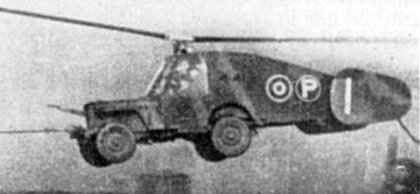
- The rotabuggy in flight

General information
- Type: military rotor kite
- National origin: UK
- Manufacturer: R Malcolm Ltd
- Designer: Raoul Hafner

History
- Manufactured: 1
- First flight: 1943

The Hafner Rotabuggy (formally known as the Malcolm Rotaplane and as the "M.L. 10/42 Flying Jeep") was a British experimental aircraft that was essentially a Willys MB combined with a rotor kite, developed with the intention of producing a way of air-dropping off-road vehicles.

== Design and development ==
It was designed by Raoul Hafner of the Airborne Forces Experimental Establishment (AFEE) after their development of the Rotachute enjoyed some success.

The prototype was built by the R. Malcolm & Co. Ltd (Note: later ML Aviation) (also producer of the Malcolm hood) at White Waltham in 1942. Air Ministry specification 10/42 for a "Special Rotating Wing Glider" was used to identify the project.

Initial testing showed that a Willys MB could be dropped from heights up to 2.35 metres (7.7 ft) without damage to the vehicle. A 12.4 metres (40 ft 8.2 in) diameter rotor was attached, along with a tail fairing and fins, but no rudders. Two men were required to pilot the aircraft: one to drive it as an automobile, and one to pilot it in the air using a control column. Initially it was named the "Blitz Buggy", but that was soon dropped for the "Rotabuggy".

The first trial was conducted on 16 November 1943, with the unit being towed behind a Diamond T lorry, but the lorry could not get enough speed to put the Rotabuggy in the air. A more powerful vehicle, a supercharged 4.5-litre Bentley automobile, was used on 27 November to finally allow the machine to become airborne and in test could obtain glide speeds of 45 mph. Later tests were made towed behind an Armstrong-Whitworth Whitley bomber.

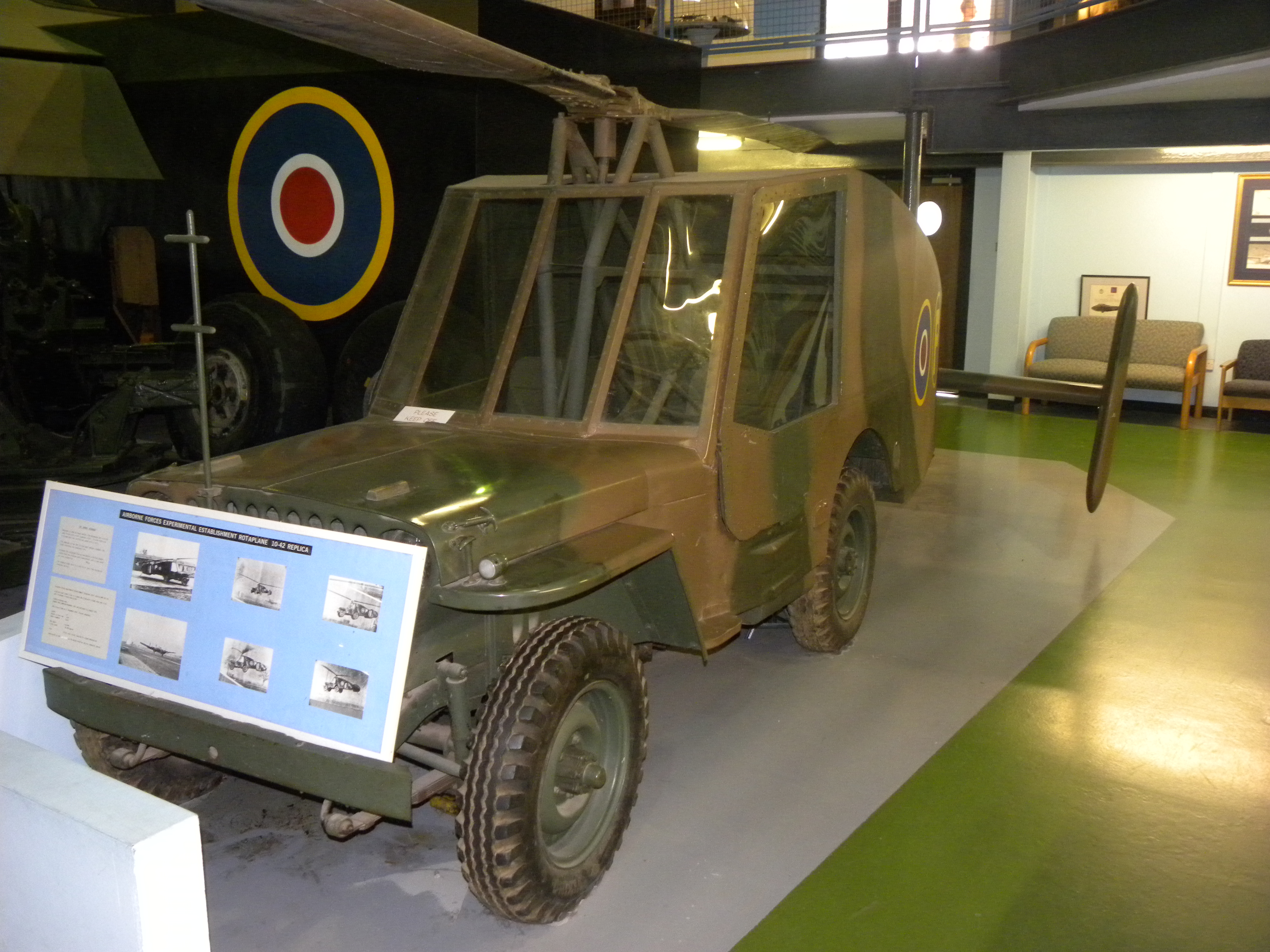
The replica Rotabuggy at the Museum of Army Flying, 2013

Although initial tests showed that the Rotabuggy was prone to severe vibration at speeds greater than 45 miles per hour (72 km/h), with improvements the Rotabuggy achieved a flight speed of 70 mph (113 km/h) on 1 February 1944. The last test flight occurred in September 1944, where the unit flew for 10 minutes at an altitude of 400 feet (121.9 m) and a speed of 65 mph (105 km/h), after being released by a Whitley bomber, and was described as "highly satisfactory". However, the introduction of gliders that could carry vehicles (such as the Waco Hadrian and Airspeed Horsa) made the Rotabuggy superfluous and further development was cancelled.

A replica of the Rotabuggy is displayed at the Museum of Army Flying in Middle Wallop. Hafner also came up with the idea of a similarly outfitted "Rotatank" using a Valentine tank, but that was never built.

== Specifications ==
Data from Nothing Ventured...

General characteristics

- Crew: 2
- Length: 21 ft 0 in (6.40 m)
- Width: 9 ft 6 in (2.90 m)
- Height: 6 ft 9 in (2.06 m) (to top of rotor hub)
- Empty weight: 2,125 lb (964 kg) (Jeep)
- Gross weight: 3,110 lb (1,411 kg)
- Main rotor diameter: 46 ft 8 in (14.22 m)
- Main rotor area: 1,711 sq ft (159.0 m^{2})

Performance

- Maximum speed: 150 mph (240 km/h, 130 kn) (max design speed)
- Rate of sink: 960 ft/min (4.9 m/s) at 48 mph (77 km/h), 1,980 ft/min (10.1 m/s) at 150 mph (240 km/h)

== See also ==
- Baynes Bat
- Flying tank

=== Postwar equivalents ===
- Ryan XV-8
