= Raoul Hafner =

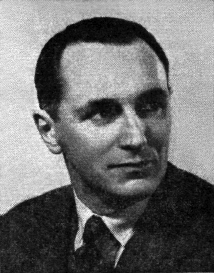
Raoul Hafner, 1954

Raoul Hafner, (1905–1980) FEng, FRAes, was an Austrian-born British helicopter pioneer and engineer. He made a distinctive contribution to the British aerospace industry, particularly in the development of helicopters.

== Life ==
Born in 1905, he was educated in Vienna, first at the university and then at technical college where he became interested in rotary-wing concept as a means of making aircraft land more slowly and safely. He obtained a post with the Austrian Air Traffic Company, but his heart was in helicopter design. He gave up his job to concentrate on helicopters, designing and building the Hafner Nagler R.I Revoplane in 1929 in collaboration with Bruno Nagler, then the similar Hafner Nagler R.II Revoplane in 1931.

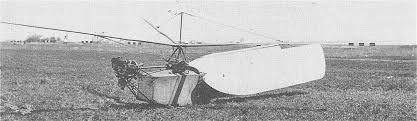
Hafner Nagler R.I Revoplane

Scottish cotton magnate Major Jack Coates, who had financed Hafner's work in Vienna, had the R.II Revoplane shipped to Heston Aerodrome in 1933 where it made tethered flights. After learning of the work of the Spanish aviation pioneer Juan de la Cierva in England, Hafner contacted the Cierva Company and learned to fly its C.19 and C.30 autogyros. He parted company with Nagler, who had come from Austria with him, then concentrated on design of gyroplanes rather than helicopters. In 1934, his company, the AR.III Construction (Hafner Gyroplane) Co, began designing the Hafner AR.III Gyroplane, first flown at Heston in 1935, and widely demonstrated afterward. It incorporated cyclic and collective pitch rotor controls actuated by independently varying the pitch of each blade rather than tilting the hub as in the Cierva system.

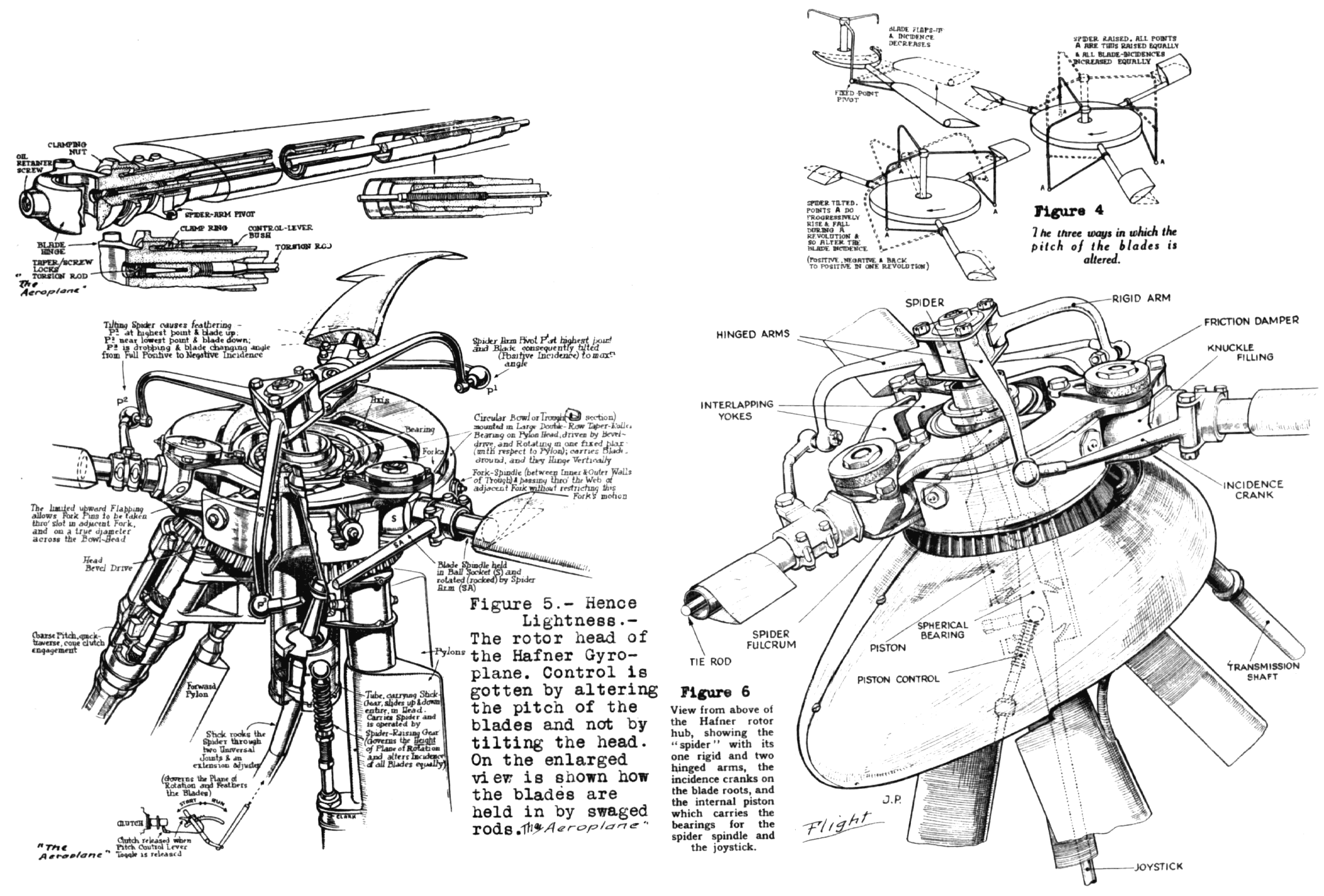
Hafner AR.III rotor head detail

In an ensuing controversy between proponents of the autogyro and the helicopter, Hafner made his views clear in a Royal Aeronautical Society lecture on 14 October 1937, when he advocated the rotary wing concept.

=== Second World War ===
From 1938 he was with Pobjoy-Short at Rochester. In 1940 he was interned as an enemy alien, being released upon his naturalization. He then developed the Hafner Rotachute, a rotary parachute to be towed behind an aircraft, for landing agents in enemy territory. This was built and tested at the Airborne Forces Experimental Establishment development section at RAF Sherburn-in-Elmet. This was followed by the Rotabuggy, a rotor-equipped jeep. Neither project progressed past testing.

=== Post War ===
After the war Hafner and some of his technical team joined the Bristol Aeroplane Company where he became their Chief Designer (Helicopters). The four/five seater Type 171 went into Royal Air Force service as the Sycamore and won several export orders. Subsequently, a much larger tandem-rotor helicopter, the Type 173, was developed. From it the Type 192 (named after the Belvedere Palace in Vienna adjacent to Hafner's childhood home) saw service in RAF squadrons in Britain and overseas.

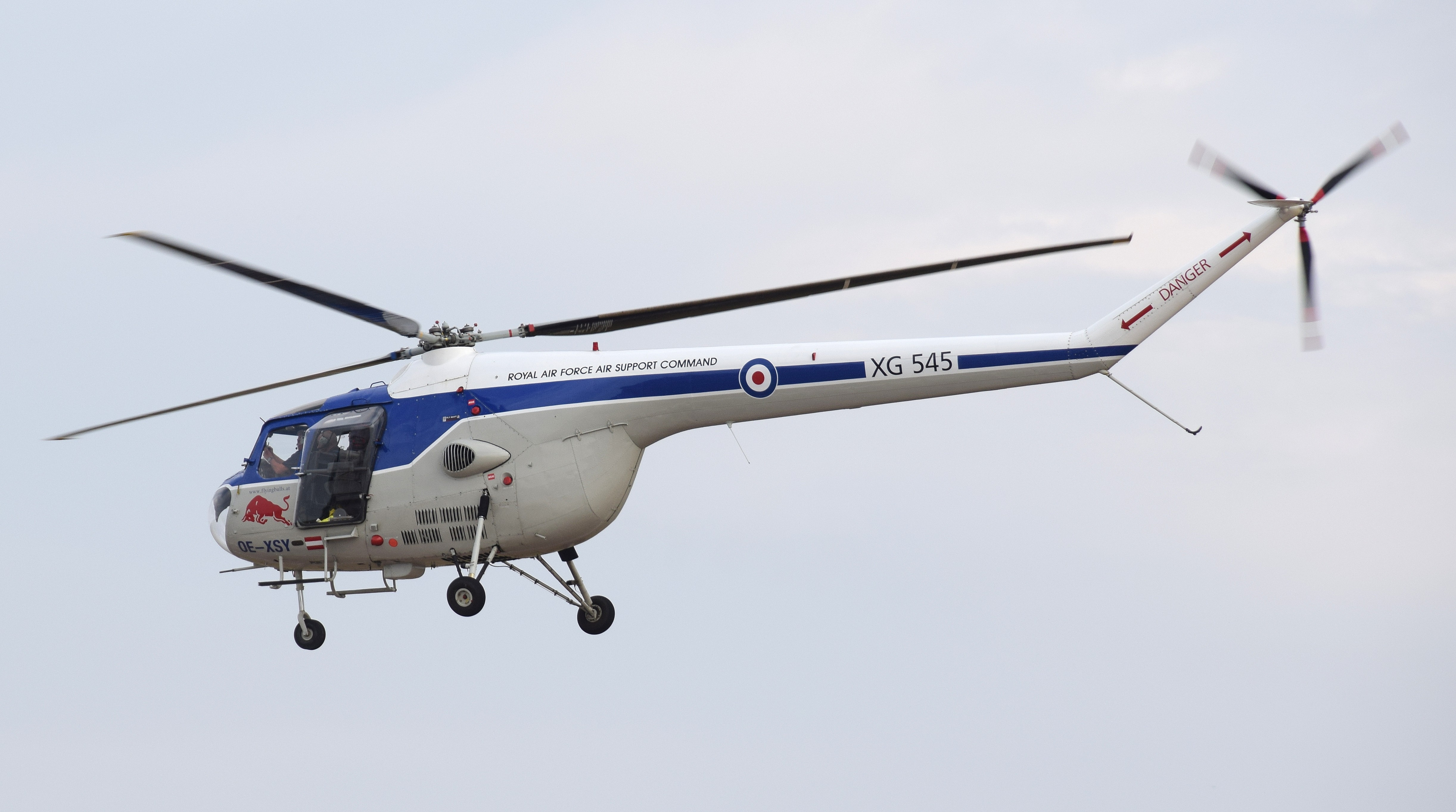
Bristol Sycamore (OE-XSY) of the Flying Bulls departs the 2018 RIAT, England. Designed by Raoul Hafner and built in 1957.

Hafner was more interested in civil rather than the military applications of helicopters. His long-term goal was for acceptance of the convertible rotor concept. One helicopter developed at Bristol was the tandem-rotor Type 194, designed to carry 52 passengers. Work on this ended when all British helicopter activities were consolidated under Westland Aircraft in 1960.

Hafner was appointed technical director, holding this position until his retirement in 1970. He continued as a consultant. During his decade with Westland he propounded his convertible rotor concepts to increase helicopter range and speed by tilting its rotors for forward flight.

He presented several papers to the Royal Aeronautical Society, and when in 1977 he was interviewed by its journal 'Aerospace' and asked about his interests outside aviation he remarked that he had "taken a great interest in sailing". He applied his knowledge of aerodynamics to sailing ship design.

== Personal ==
In 1936 Hafner married Eileen McAdam of the macadam road-building family descended from John Loudon McAdam. They had one daughter, actress Ingrid Hafner. He later died as a result of a yachting accident.
