= Igor Bensen =

American aircraft designer (1917–2000)

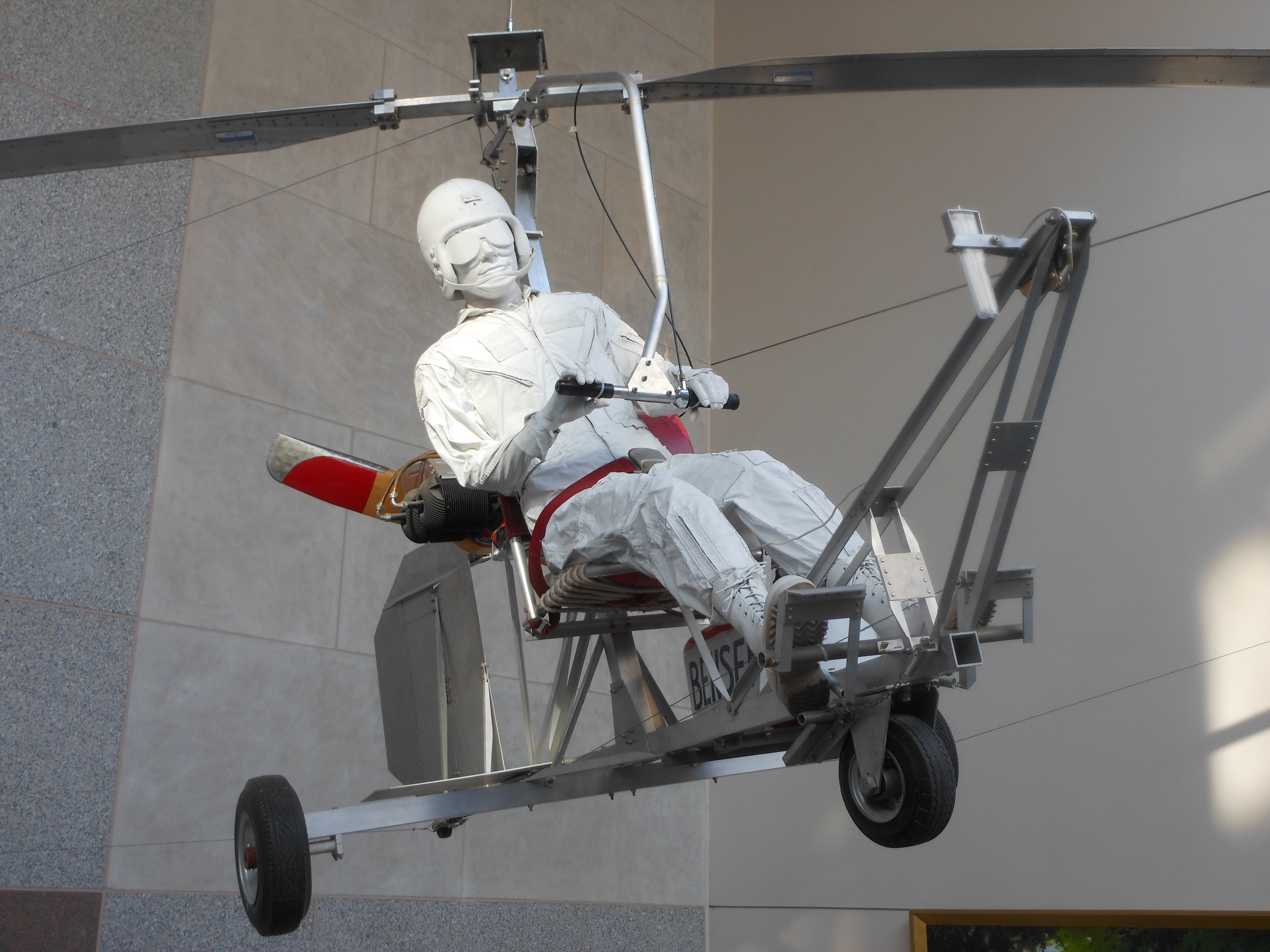
- Igor Bensen Figure at the North Carolina Museum of History
- Born: April 1, 1917; Rostov-on-Don, Russia
- Died: February 10, 2000 (aged 82)

Igor Vasilevich Bensen (Russian: И́горь Васи́льевич Бенсен; April 1, 1917 – February 10, 2000) was a Russian-American engineer. He founded Bensen Aircraft, a US company which produced a successful line of gyrogliders (rotor kites) and autogyros.

== Early life and education ==
He was born in Rostov-on-Don, Russia, and eventually reached the United States in 1937. He began studies at age 17 while in Belgium, won a scholarship to study in the US three years later. He received a Bachelor of Science degree in mechanical engineering from Stevens Institute of Technology in Hoboken, New Jersey in 1940, later becoming a Registered Professional Engineer.

== Career ==
Bensen flew his first towed gyroglider in 1954. He founded the Popular Rotorcraft Association (PRA) in 1962, a non-profit interest group for owners and homebuilders of autogyros and helicopters, based in Mentone, Indiana. He was the group's president from 1962 to 1971.

== Honors and awards ==
He received an honorary Doctor of Divinity degree from Indiana University in 1968.

== Personal life and death ==
Bensen died from Parkinson's disease at age 82.
