= Gusset plate =

Structural element which connects beams and girders to columns

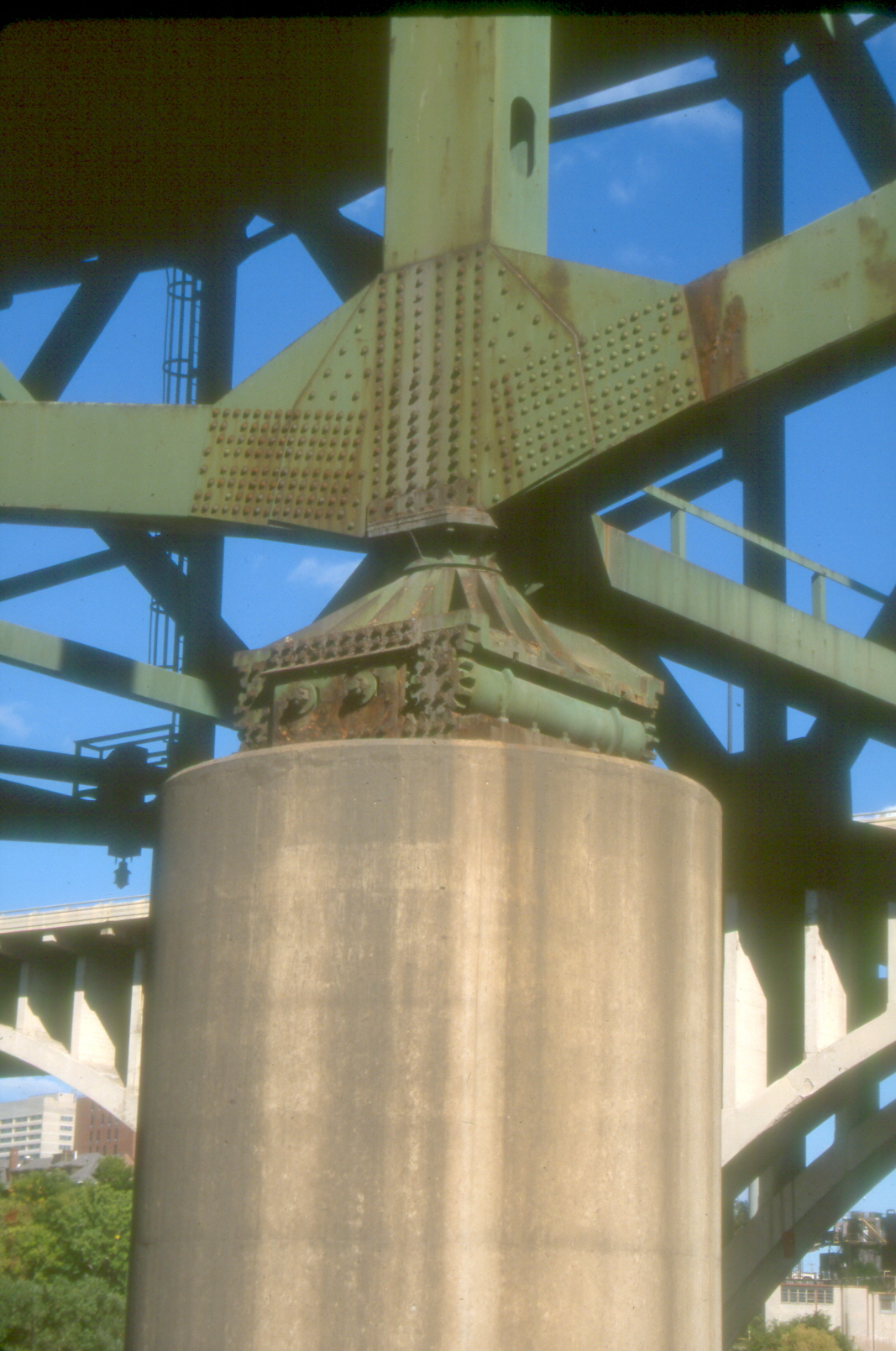
- Gusset plate used on the I-35W Mississippi River bridge, which collapsed in 2007
- Material: steel, copper, or aluminum
- Uses: Bridges, buildings, and other structures
- Connection methods: Welding, bolts, or rivets

In structural engineering and construction, a gusset plate is a plate for connecting beams and girders to columns. A gusset plate can be fastened to a permanent member either by bolts, rivets or welding or a combination of the three. They are used in bridges and buildings, as well as other structures.

== Materials ==
Gusset plates are usually either made from cold-rolled or galvanized steel, based upon their use. Galvanized steel offers more protection from rust, so this is usually used when the gusset plate is exposed to the elements. The gusset plate is usually painted to match nearby steel and fixtures and to give it an extra layer of protection.

Occasionally gusset plates are made from copper or aluminum, but only with small structures that do not require much support. The copper and aluminum gusset plates also provide a more attractive finish for exposed structures.

== Uses ==
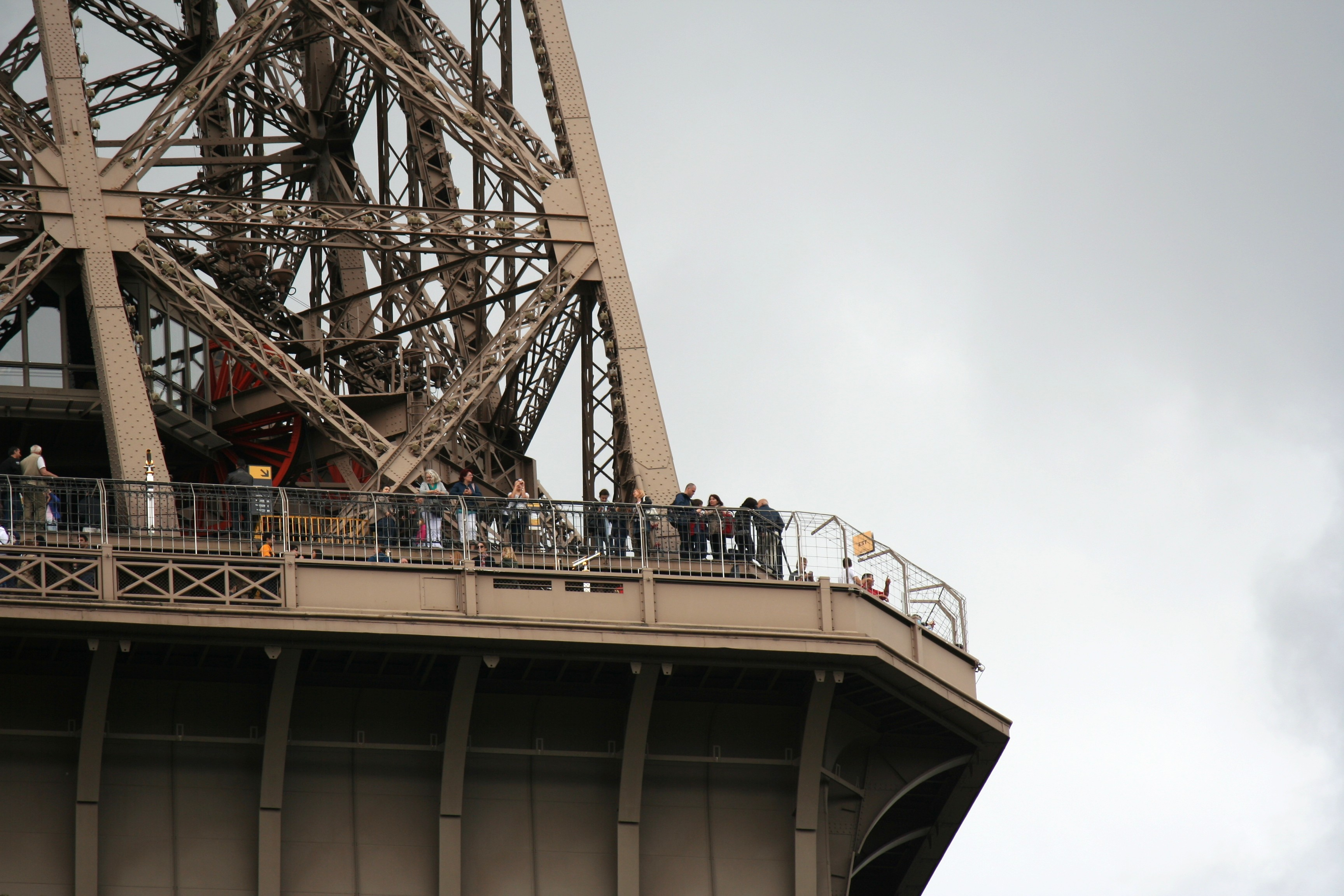
Gusset plates securing riveted criss-crossing steel beams of the Eiffel Tower

Gusset plates are used for various structures. Gusset plates are used to connect beams and columns together or to connect truss members. They can be either the only way of connecting the beam and columns or they can be used with bolts and welds.

Gusset plates are therefore used in most metal weight-bearing structures, but the material and size of the gusset plate varies based on the structure. Bridges usually require thick sheets of steel for their gusset plates, but trusses sometimes only require small sheets of aluminium for their gusset plate.

The size and strength of the gusset plate depends on size and the function of the structure. The larger the force on the connecting members, the larger the size of the gusset plate. Gusset plates provide an easy way to retrofit structures that can no longer safely support the applied loads.

== Design reconsideration ==
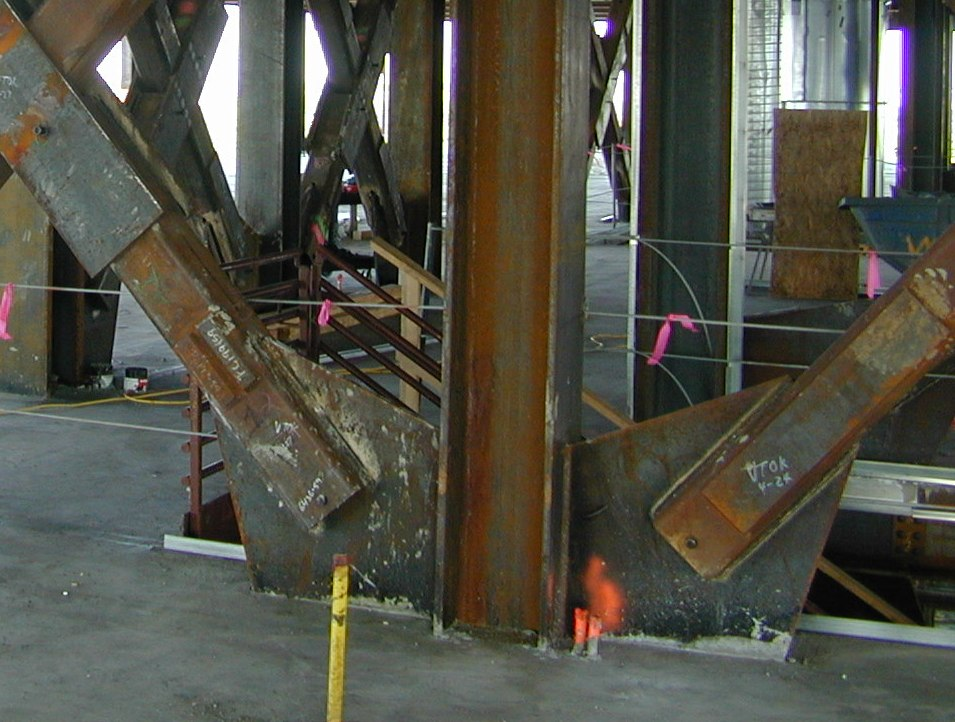
A KT gusset plate

Gusset plates can be made into a variety of shapes and sizes and from a range of materials.

Gusset plates are usually square or rectangular, but can be triangular or made into a customized shape to fit the joint. The shape of each plate is designed so that welding or bolts can be applied to different edges of the plate.

A gusset plate can form the entire connection or it can be used in conjunction with bolts or welds.

There are several prominent connection types that include gusset plates, which include KT gusset plates, uniform force bracing connections, and bolt groups.

A KT gusset plate connects several members together through one gusset plate. The gusset plate is welded to a beam, and then two or three columns, beams, or truss chord are connected to the other side of the gusset plate through bolts or rivets or welds.

A uniform force bracing connection connects a beam, column, and one other member. The gusset plate is bolted to the column and welded to the beam. The connection of the last remaining member can be through either bolts or welds.

== Notable failures ==
A video showing the collapse of the Interstate 35-W Mississippi River bridge from a security camera

=== Steel bridges ===
The most notable bridge failure due to gusset plates is the collapse of I-35W Mississippi River bridge in Minneapolis, Minnesota on August 1, 2007. Investigators found that the bridge had 16 under-designed gusset plates that fractured and ripped, and that the remaining gusset plates were properly designed and remained intact.

The 16 under-designed plates that failed were found to be only 1/2 inch thick when they should have been thicker to be in accordance with the American Association of State Highway and Transportation Officials (AASHTO) “Standard Specifications for Highway Bridges”, 1961. The National Transportation Safety Board attributed most of the cause of the failure of the bridge to this flaw.

In addition to the gusset plates being under-designed for their original loading, there were other factors that led to the demise:

- At the time of the collapse of the bridge, approximately 300 tons of construction equipment was located near several of the under-designed gusset plates.
- The bridge was completed in 1967, but in 1977 and 1998, a median barrier, larger outside walls, and a thicker concrete deck were added to the bridge, causing additional loading on the already under-designed gusset plates.
- The temperature on the day of the collapse also could have introduced additional expansion stresses on the gusset plates, since the bearings on the bridge were partially "frozen" (due to corrosion, not temperature) limiting their effectiveness.

=== Radio telescopes ===
The current Green Bank Telescope at Green Bank, West Virginia, completed in 2000, was built following the collapse of the previous Green Bank telescope, a 90.44 m paraboloid erected in 1962. The previous telescope collapsed on 15 November 1988 due to the sudden loss of a gusset plate in the box girder assembly, which was a key component for the structural integrity of the telescope. Most radio and telecommunications dishes have gusset plates somewhere in their design, some designs more than others. As a general maintenance practice, these plates should be checked every two or three years, depending on the size of the dish.
