= Techno-Sud Vigilant =

Vigilant

General information
- Type: Reconnaissance UAV helicopter
- National origin: France
- Manufacturer: Techno-Sud

The Techno-Sud Vigilant is a small UAV helicopter developed in France in the 1990s for reconnaissance and surveillance applications.

It is a helicopter of conventional main-tail rotor configuration, and powered by a 9 kW (12 hp) two-stroke engine. The Vigilant is marketed by Thales, and is being sold to both military and civilian users. Civilian users have accounted for the bulk of sales, using it for applications such as security or environmental monitoring.

== Specifications ==
General characteristics

- Crew: None
- Length: 2.30 m (7 ft 6 in)
- Gross weight: 40 kg (90 lb)
- Powerplant: 1 × piston engine , 9.0 kW (12 hp)
- Main rotor diameter: 1.83 m (6 ft 0 in)

Performance

- Maximum speed: 100 km/h (60 mph, 52 kn)
- Endurance: 1 hours
- Service ceiling: 1,800 m (6,000 ft)
