= Kopp–Etchells effect =

Corona or halo on the rotor blades of helicopters operating in sandy conditions

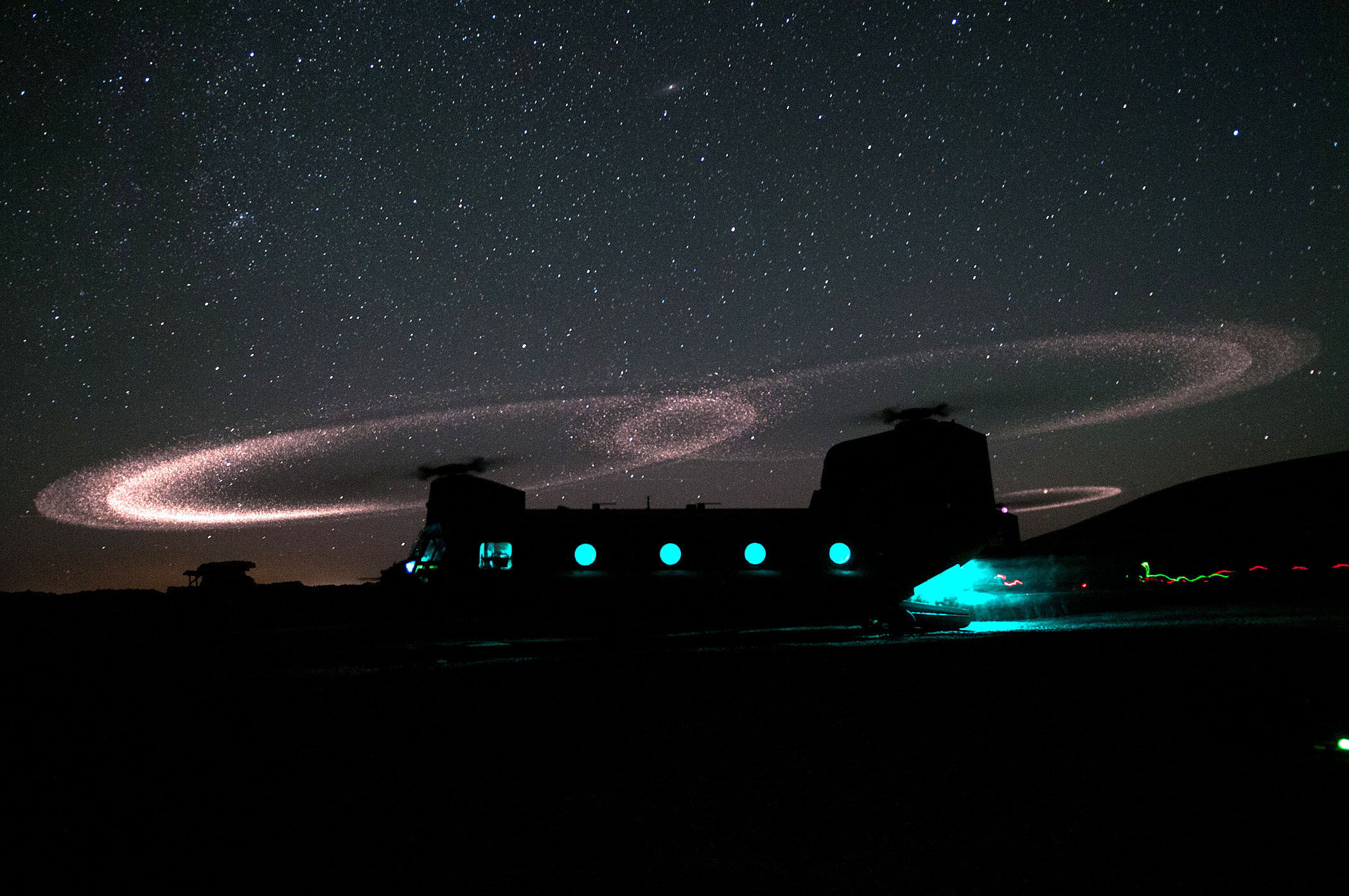
The Kopp–Etchells effect produced by a CH-47 Chinook helicopter in Afghanistan

The Kopp–Etchells effect is a sparkling ring or disk that is sometimes produced by rotary-wing aircraft when operating in sandy conditions, particularly near the ground at night. The name was coined by photographer Michael Yon to honor two soldiers who were killed in combat; Benjamin Kopp, a US Army Ranger, and Joseph Etchells, a British soldier. Both were killed in combat in Sangin, Afghanistan in July 2009.

Other names that have been used to describe this phenomenon include scintillation, halo effect, pixie dust, and corona effect.

== Explanation ==
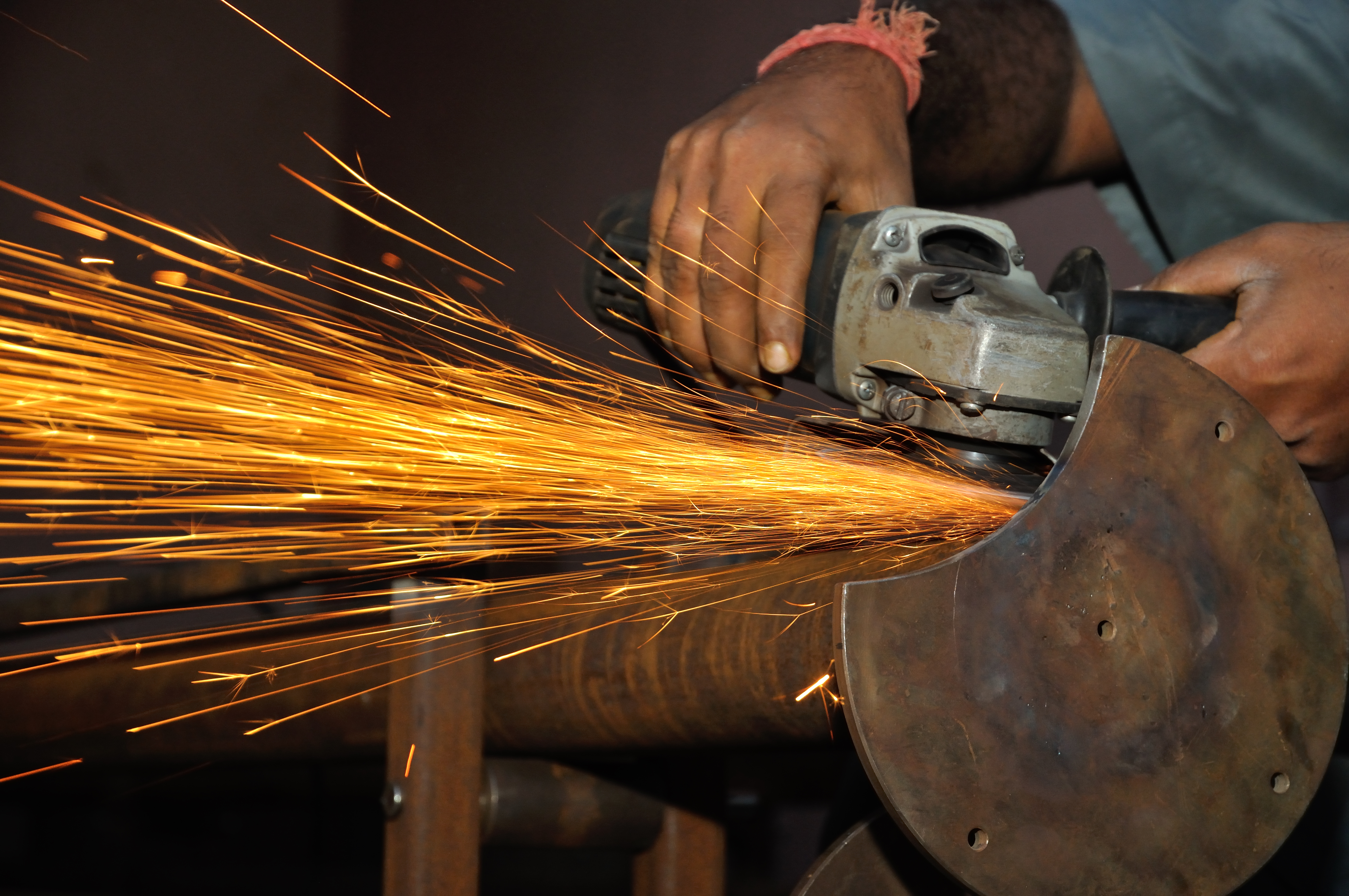
The Kopp–Etchells effect is created by metallic sparks, similar to the sparks generated when grinding metal.

Helicopter rotors are fitted with abrasion shields along their leading edges to protect the blades. These abrasion strips are often made of titanium, stainless steel, or nickel alloys, which are very hard, but not as hard as silica-based sand. When a helicopter flies low to the ground in sandy environments, sand can strike the metal abrasion strip and cause erosion, which produces a visible corona or halo around the rotor blades. The effect is caused by the pyrophoric oxidation of the ablated metal particles.

In this way, the Kopp–Etchells effect is similar to the sparks made by a grinder, which are also due to pyrophoricity. When a speck of metal is chipped off the rotor, it is heated by rapid oxidation. This occurs because its freshly exposed surface reacts with oxygen to produce heat. If the particle is sufficiently small, then its mass is small compared to its surface area, and so heat is generated faster than it can be dissipated. This causes the particle to become so hot that it reaches its ignition temperature. At that point, the metal continues to burn freely.

Abrasion strips made of titanium produce the brightest sparks, and the intensity increases with the size and concentration of sand grains in the air.

Sand particles are more likely to hit the rotor when the rotorcraft is near the ground. This occurs because sand is blown into the air by the downwash and then carried to the top of the rotor disk by a vortex of air. This process is called recirculation and can lead to a complete brownout in severe situations. The Kopp–Etchells effect is not necessarily associated with takeoff and landing operations. It has been observed without night vision goggles at altitudes as high as 1700 ft.

== Other theories ==
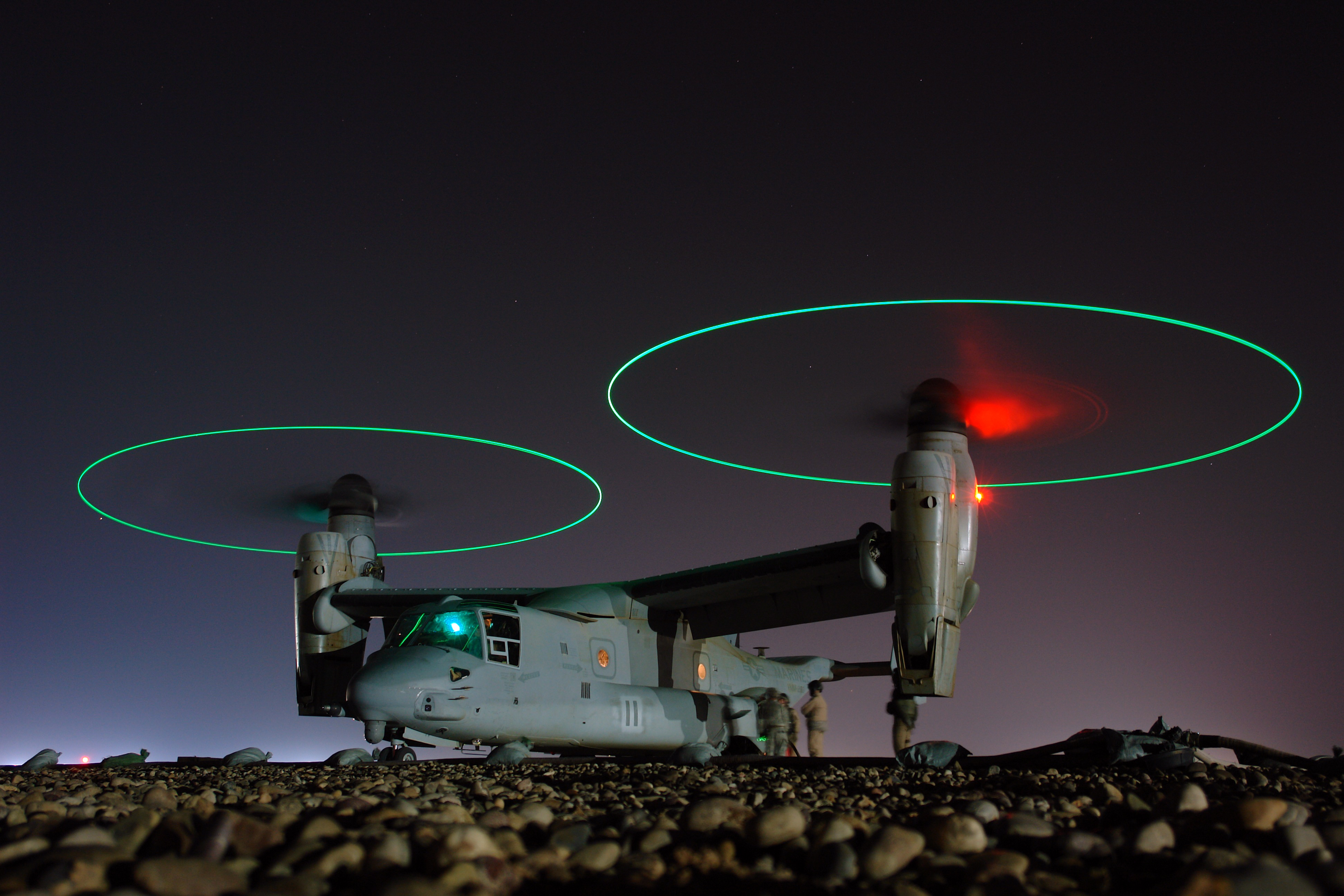
Rotor tip lights produce a visually similar but distinct effect.

The effect is often and incorrectly believed to be an electrical phenomenon, either as a result of static electricity as in St. Elmo's Fire, or due to the interaction of sand with the rotor (triboelectric effect), or a piezoelectric property of quartz sand.

Mechanical action has been considered, whereby impact with the sand particles may cause photoluminescence. Additionally, mechanisms relating to triboluminescence, chemiluminescence, and electroluminescence have been suggested.

Yet another incorrect theory is that the extreme speed of the helicopter blades pushes sand particles out of the way so fast that they burn up like meteors in the atmosphere due to adiabatic heating.

Groundcrew have mistaken the phenomenon for fire or other malfunctions.

== Consequences ==
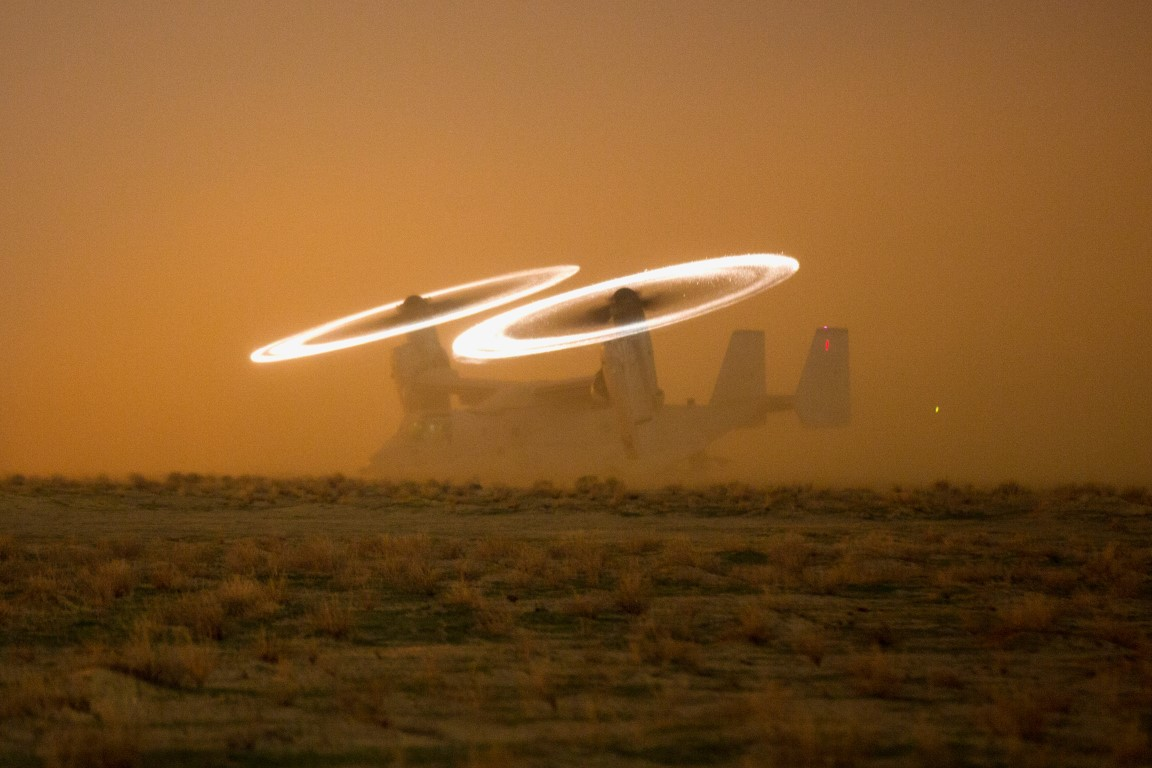
The Kopp–Etchells effect creates a halo around the rotors of a MV-22 Osprey in this long-exposure photograph.

The erosion associated with the Kopp–Etchells effect presents costly maintenance and logistics problems, and is an example of foreign object damage (FOD).

Sand hitting the moving rotor blades represents a security risk because of the highly visible ring it produces, which places military operations at a tactical disadvantage when trying to remain concealed in darkness.

The light from the Kopp–Etchells effect can interfere with the pilot's ability to see, especially when using night vision equipment. This may cause difficulty with landing safely, and produce spatial disorientation.

== See also ==
- Index of aviation articles
- Corona discharge
- Wingtip vortices
