= Helicopter rotor =

Aircraft component

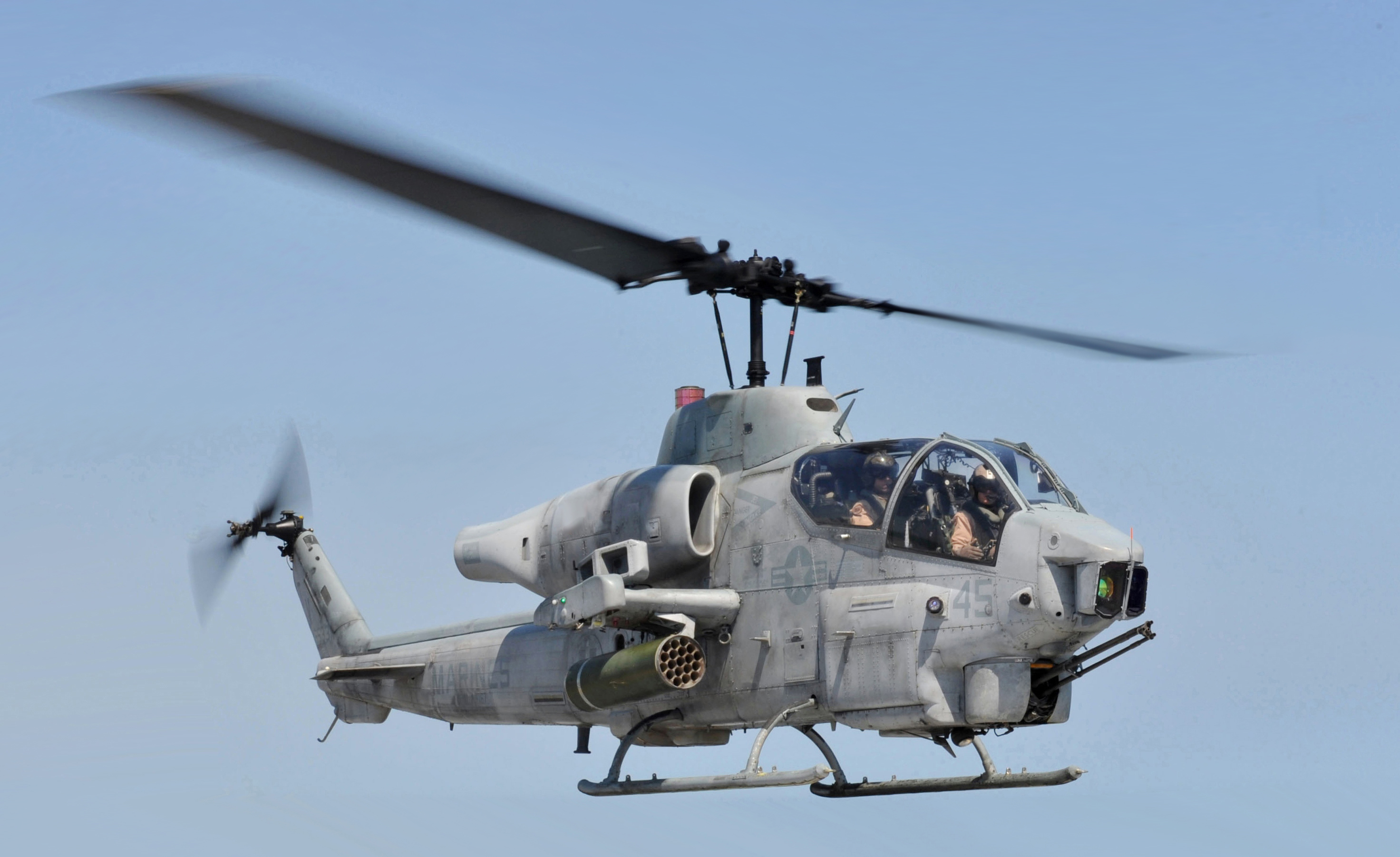
A Bell AH-1 SuperCobra with a 2-bladed semirigid main rotor

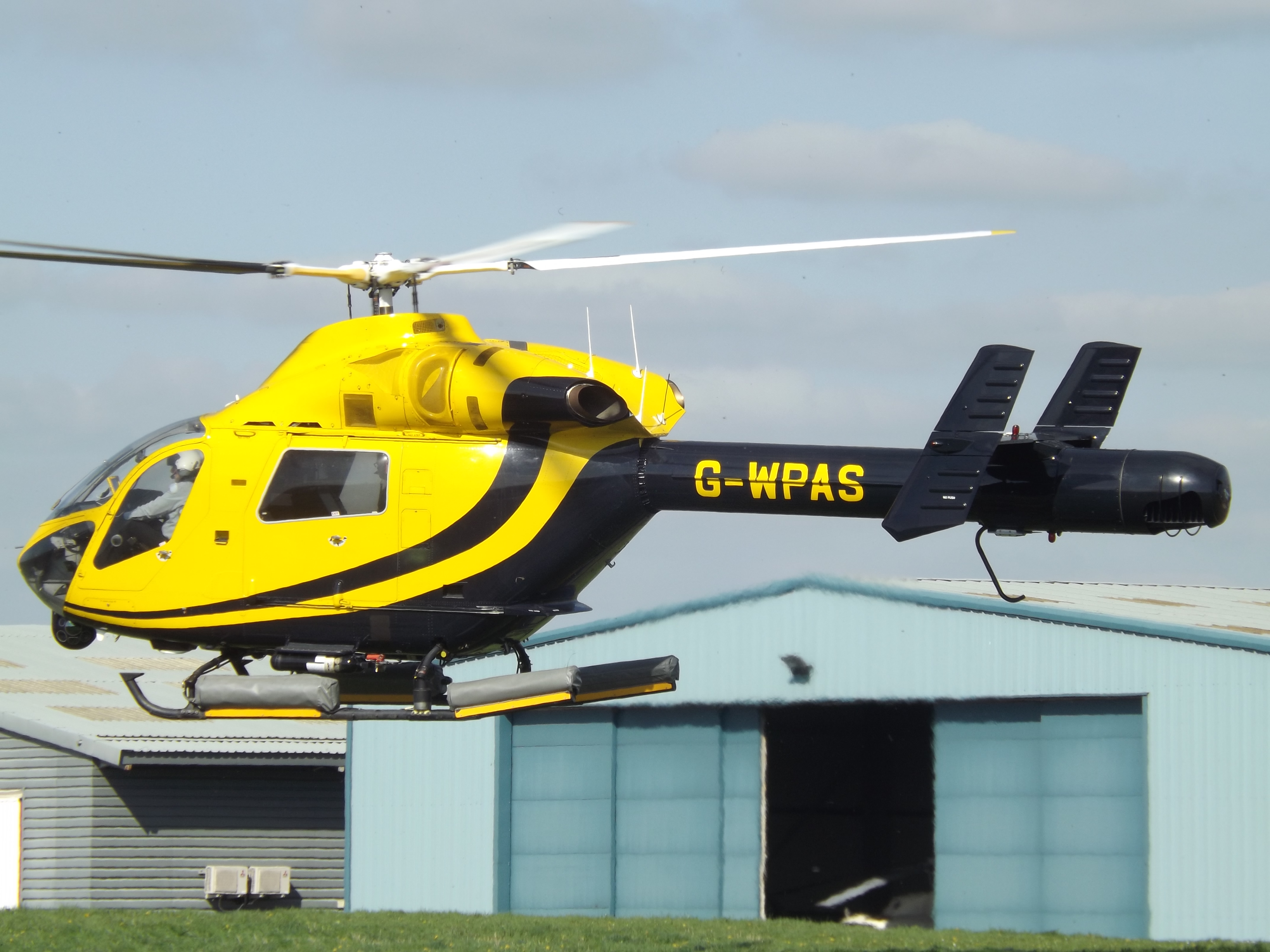
NOTAR helicopter with a rotorless tail

Merlin Mk2 helicopter flying. This three-engined helicopter has a single large main rotor and smaller tail rotor

On a helicopter, the main rotor or rotor system is the combination of several rotary wings (rotor blades) with a control system, that generates the aerodynamic lift force that supports the weight of the helicopter, and the thrust that counteracts aerodynamic drag in forward flight. Each main rotor is mounted on a vertical mast over the top of the helicopter, as opposed to a helicopter tail rotor, which connects through a combination of drive shaft(s) and gearboxes along the tail boom. The blade pitch is typically controlled by the pilot using the helicopter flight controls. Helicopters are one example of rotary-wing aircraft (rotorcraft). The name is derived from the Greek words helix, helik-, meaning spiral; and pteron meaning wing.

== Design principles ==
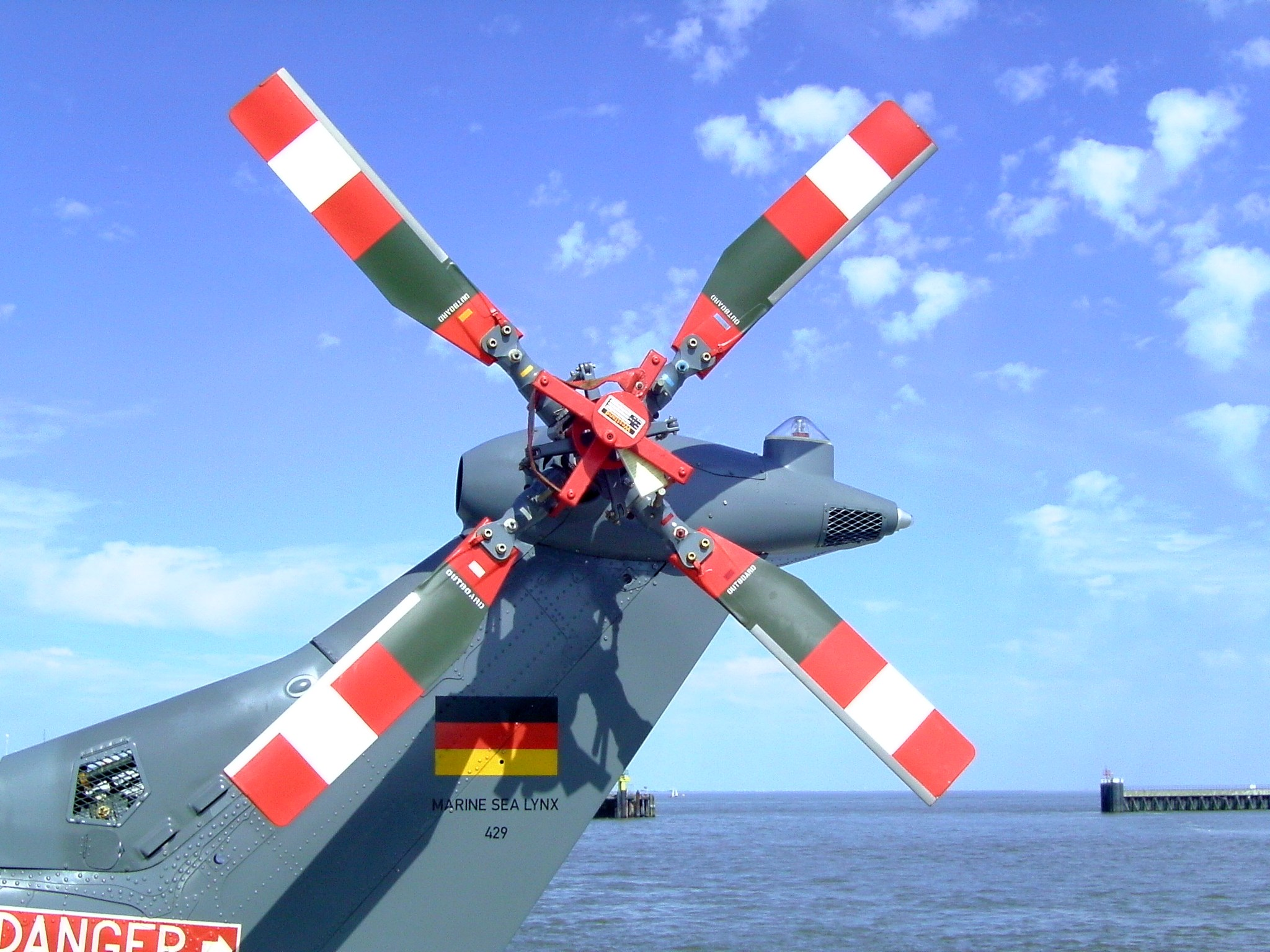
Tail Rotor of a Sea Lynx, the smaller tail rotor counteracts the torque of the spinning main rotor in many designs, although there are other solutions to this, such as having two counter-rotating main rotors

=== Overview ===
The helicopter rotor is powered by the engine, through the transmission, to the rotating mast. The mast is a cylindrical metal shaft that extends upward from—and is driven by—the transmission. At the top of the mast is the attachment point (colloquially called a Jesus nut) for the rotor blades called the hub. The rotor blades are then attached to the hub, and the hub can have 10-20 times the drag of the blade. Main rotor systems are classified according to how the main rotor blades are attached and move relative to the main rotor hub. There are three basic classifications: rigid, semirigid, and fully articulated, although some modern rotor systems use a combination of these classifications. A rotor is a finely tuned rotating mass, and different subtle adjustments reduce vibrations at different airspeeds. The rotors are designed to operate at a fixed RPM (within a narrow range of a few percent), but a few experimental aircraft used variable speed rotors.

Unlike the small diameter fans used in turbofan jet engines, the main rotor on a helicopter has a large diameter that lets it accelerate a large volume of air. This permits a lower downwash velocity for a given amount of thrust. As it is more efficient at low speeds to accelerate a large amount of air by a small degree than a small amount of air by a large degree, a low disk loading (thrust per disc area) greatly increases the aircraft's energy efficiency, and this reduces the fuel use and permits reasonable range. The hover efficiency ("figure of merit") of a typical helicopter is around 60%. The inner third length of a rotor blade contributes very little to lift due to its low airspeed.

=== Blades ===
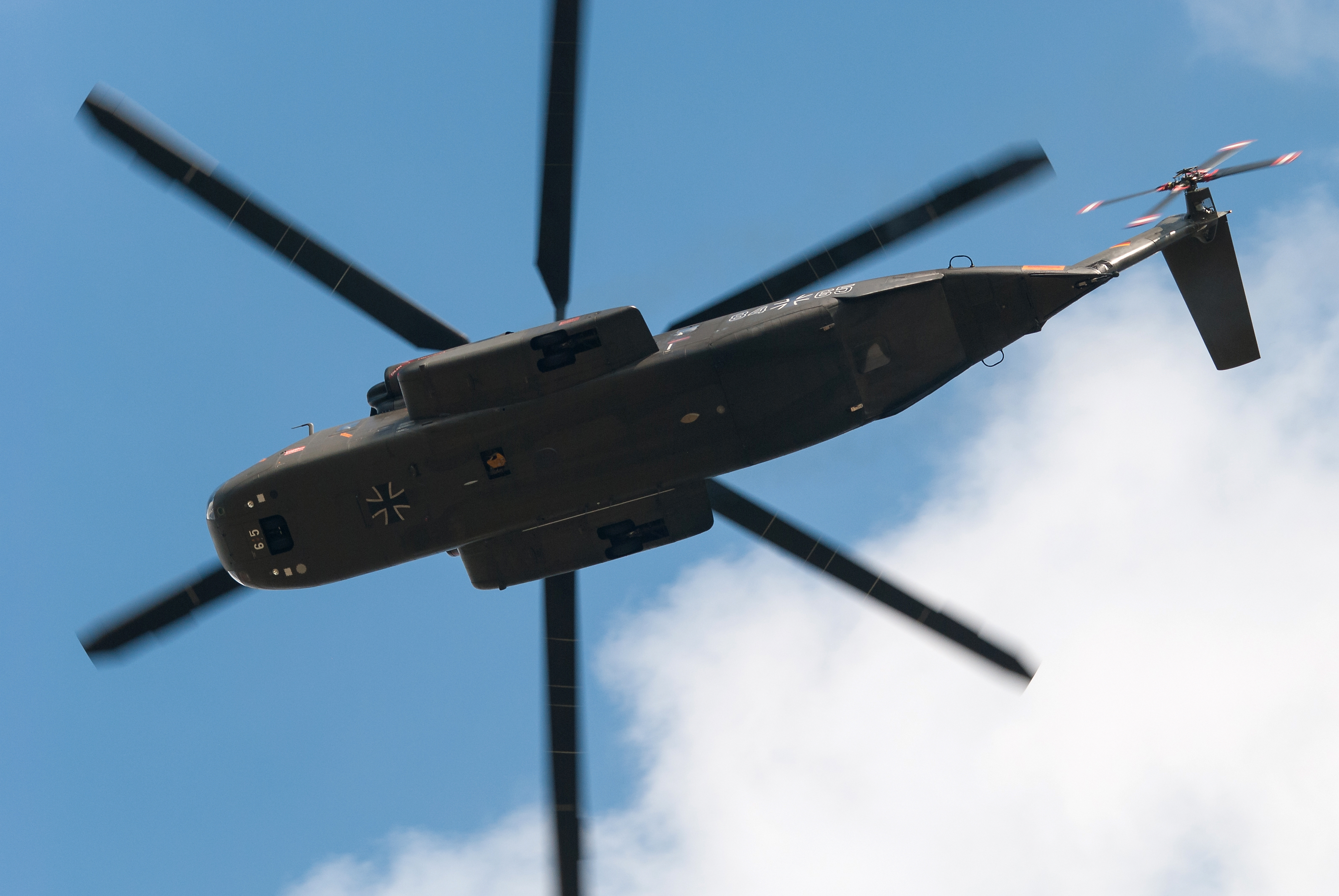
Looking up at CH-53G, which has 6-blades on its main rotor

The blades of a helicopter are long, narrow airfoils with a high aspect ratio, a shape that minimizes drag from tip vortices (see the wings of a glider for comparison). They generally contain a degree of washout that reduces the lift generated at the tips, where the airflow is fastest and vortex generation would be a significant problem. Rotor blades are made out of various materials, including aluminium, composite structure, and steel or titanium, with abrasion shields along the leading edge.

Rotorcraft blades are traditionally passive; however, some helicopters include active components on their blades. The Kaman K-MAX uses trailing edge flaps for blade pitch control and the Hiller YH-32 Hornet was powered by ramjets mounted on the blade ends. As of 2010, research into active blade control through trailing edge flaps is underway. Tips of some helicopter blades can be specially designed to reduce turbulence and noise and to provide more efficient flying. An example of such tips are the tips of the BERP rotors created during the British Experimental Rotor Programme.

=== Hub ===
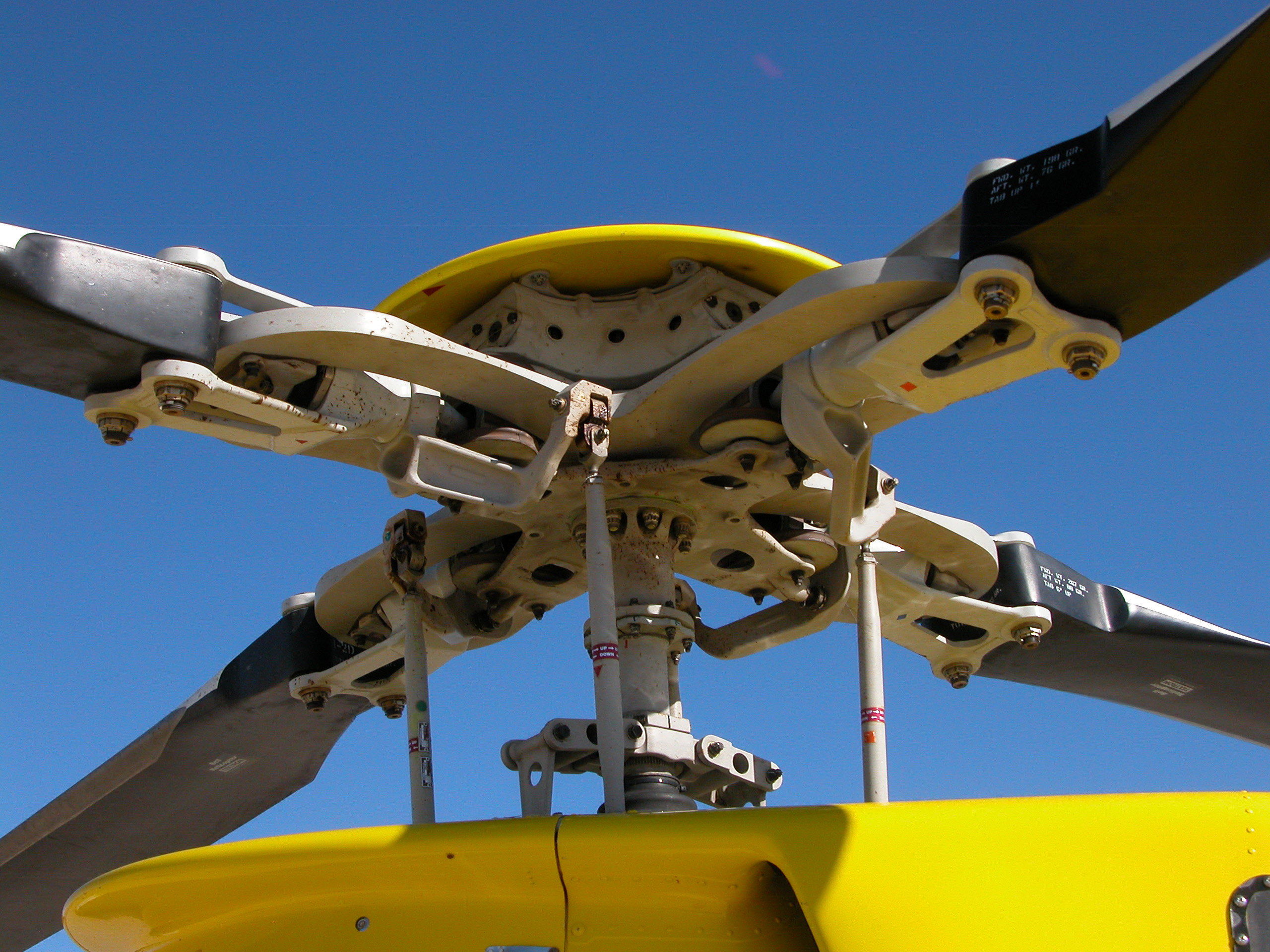
Rotorhead of a Bell 407

Description of a simple rotor:

- The following are driven by the link rods from the rotating part of the swashplate.
  - Pitch hinges, allowing the blades to twist about the axis extending from blade root to blade tip.
- Teeter hinge, allowing one blade to rise vertically while the other falls vertically. This motion occurs whenever translational relative wind is present, or in response to a cyclic control input.
- Scissor link and counterweight, carries the main shaft rotation down to the upper swashplate
- Rubber covers protect moving and stationary shafts
- Swashplates, transmitting cyclic and collective pitch to the blades (the top one rotates)
- Three non-rotating control rods transmit pitch information to the lower swashplate
- Main mast leading down to main gearbox

==== Fully articulated ====
Diagram of fully articulated main rotor head

Juan de la Cierva developed the fully articulating rotor for the autogyro. The basis of his design permitted successful helicopter development. In a fully articulated rotor system, each rotor blade is attached to the rotor hub through a series of hinges that let the blade move independently of the others. These rotor systems usually have three or more blades. The blades are allowed to flap, feather, and lead or lag independently of each other. The horizontal hinge, called the flapping hinge, allows the blade to move up and down. This movement is called flapping and is designed to compensate for dissymmetry of lift. The flapping hinge may be located at varying distances from the rotor hub, and there may be more than one hinge. The vertical hinge, called the lead-lag hinge or drag hinge, allows the blade to move back and forth. This movement is called lead-lag, dragging, or hunting. Dampers are usually used to prevent excess back and forth movement around the drag hinge. The purpose of the drag hinge and dampers is to compensate for acceleration and deceleration caused by the difference in drag experienced by the advancing and retreating blades. Later models have switched from using traditional bearings to elastomeric bearings. Elastomeric bearings are naturally fail-safe and their wear is gradual and visible. The metal-to-metal contact of older bearings and the need for lubrication is eliminated in this design. The third hinge in the fully articulated system is called the feathering hinge about the feathering axis. This hinge is responsible for the change in pitch of rotor blades excited via pilot input to the collective or cyclic.

A variation of the fully articulated system is the soft-in-plane rotor system. This type of rotor can be found on several aircraft produced by Bell Helicopter, such as the OH-58D Kiowa Warrior and 429 GlobalRanger. Each blade has the ability to flap and hunt independently of the other blades, as in a rotor using mechanical hinges, but a soft-in-plane rotor relies on structural flexibility instead of mechanical hinges for blade flapping. On Bell aircraft, this flexibility is provided by a composite yoke which is attached to the mast and runs through the blade grips between the blades and the shear bearing inside the grip. This yoke does transfer some movement of one blade to another, usually opposing blades. While this is not fully articulated, the flight characteristics are very similar and maintenance time and cost are reduced.

==== Rigid ====
The term rigid rotor usually refers to a hingeless rotor system with blades flexibly attached to the hub. Irv Culver of Lockheed developed one of the first rigid rotors, which was tested and developed on a series of helicopters in the 1960s and 1970s. In a rigid rotor system, each blade flaps and drags about flexible sections of the root. A rigid rotor system is mechanically simpler than a fully articulated rotor system. The aerodynamic and mechanical loads from flapping and lead/lag forces are accommodated through rotor blades flexing, rather than through hinges. By flexing, the blades themselves compensate for the forces that previously required rugged hinges. The result is a rotor system that has less lag in control response because of the large hub moment typically generated. The rigid rotor system thus eliminates the danger of mast bumping inherent in semirigid rotors.

=== Semirigid ===
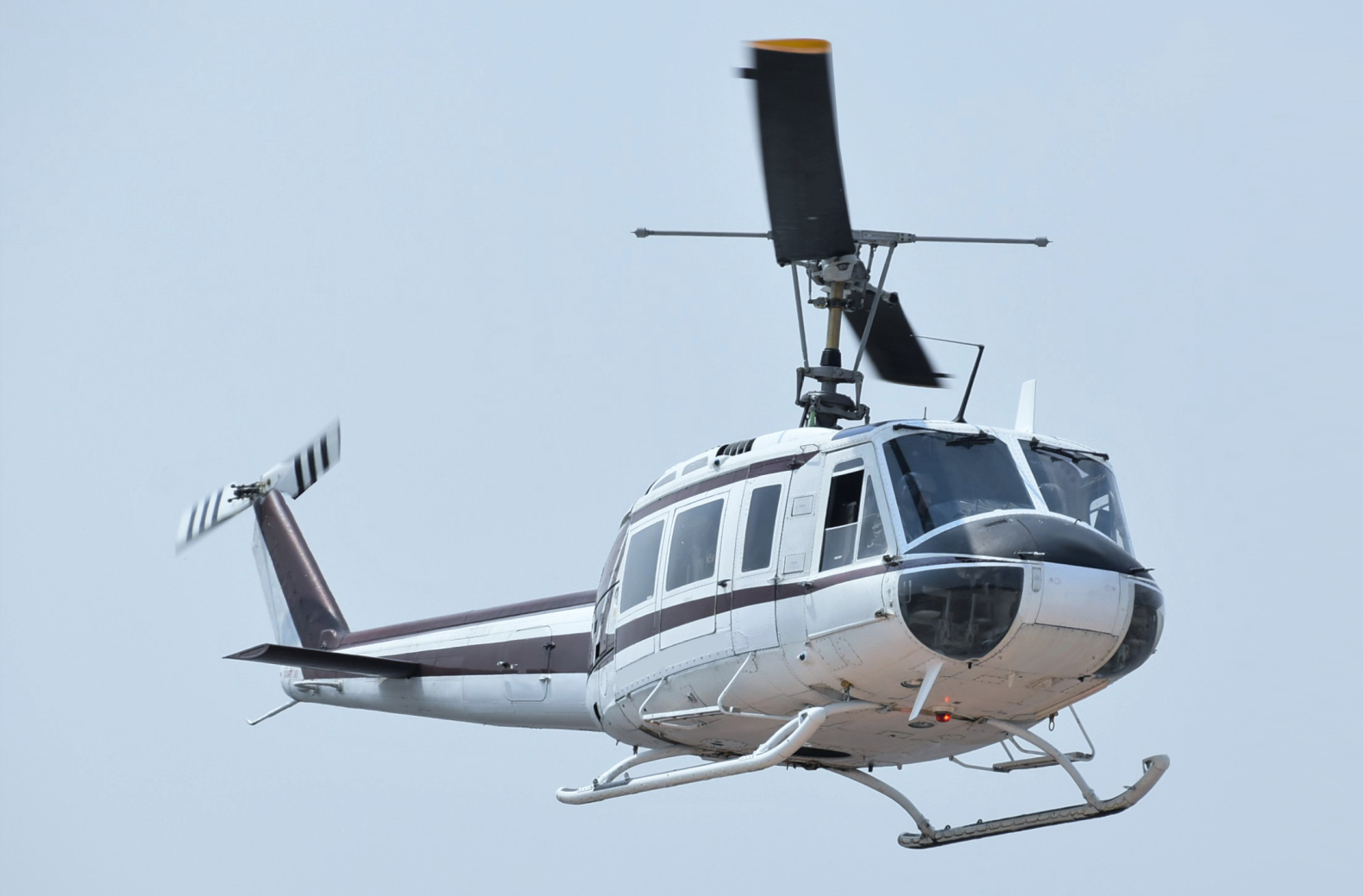
A Bell 205 with a semirigid rotor and stabilizer bar

The semirigid rotor can also be referred to as a teetering or seesaw rotor. This system is normally composed of two blades that meet just under a common flapping or teetering hinge at the rotor shaft. This allows the blades to flap together in opposite motions like a seesaw. This underslinging of the blades below the teetering hinge, combined with an adequate dihedral or coning angle on the blades, minimizes variations in the radius of each blade's center of mass from the axis of rotation as the rotor turns, which in turn reduces the stress on the blades from lead and lag forces caused by the Coriolis effect. Secondary flapping hinges may also be used to provide sufficient flexibility to minimize bouncing. Feathering is accomplished by the feathering hinge at the blade root, which allows changes to the pitch angle of the blade.

==== Combination ====
Modern rotor systems may use the combined principles of the rotor systems mentioned above. Some rotor hubs incorporate a flexible hub, which allows for blade bending (flexing) without the need for bearings or hinges. These systems, called flexures, are usually constructed from composite material. Elastomeric bearings may also be used in place of conventional roller bearings. Elastomeric bearings are constructed from a rubber type material and provide limited movement that is perfectly suited for helicopter applications. Flexures and elastomeric bearings require no lubrication and, therefore, require less maintenance. They also absorb vibration, which means less fatigue and longer service life for the helicopter components.

==== Swashplate ====
Controls vary the pitch of the main rotor blades cyclically throughout rotation. The pilot uses this to control the direction of the rotor thrust vector, which defines the part of the rotor disc where the maximum thrust develops. Collective pitch varies the magnitude of rotor thrust by increasing or decreasing thrust over the whole rotor disc at the same time. These blade pitch variations are controlled by tilting, raising, or lowering the swash plate with the flight controls. The vast majority of helicopters maintain a constant rotor speed (RPM) during flight, leaving the angle of attack of the blades as the sole means of adjusting thrust from the rotor.

The swashplate is two concentric disks or plates. One plate rotates with the mast, connected by idle links, while the other does not rotate. The rotating plate is also connected to the individual blades through pitch links and pitch horns. The non-rotating plate is connected to links that are manipulated by pilot controls—specifically, the collective and cyclic controls. The swash plate can shift vertically and tilt. Through shifting and tilting, the non-rotating plate controls the rotating plate, which in turn controls the individual blade pitch.

==== Flybar (stabilizer bar) ====
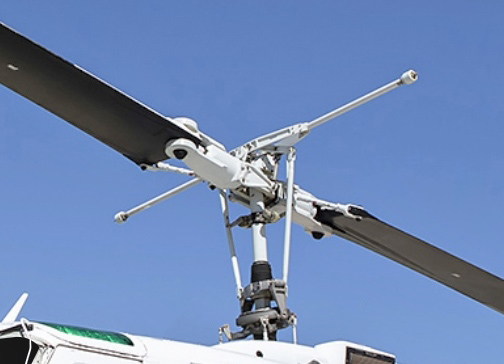
A semirigid rotor head with a flybar

A number of engineers, among them Arthur M. Young in the U.S. and radio-control aeromodeler Dieter Schlüter in Germany, found that flight stability for helicopters could be achieved with a stabilizer bar, or flybar. The flybar has a weight or paddle (or both for added stability on smaller helicopters) at each end to maintain a constant plane of rotation. Through mechanical linkages, the stable rotation of the bar mixes with the swashplate movement to damp internal (steering) as well as external (wind) forces on the rotor. This makes it easier for the pilot to maintain control of the aircraft. Stanley Hiller arrived at a similar method to improve stability by adding short stubby airfoils, or paddles, at each end. However, Hiller's "Rotormatic" system also delivered cyclic control inputs to the main rotor as a sort of control rotor, and the paddles provided the added stability by damping the effects of external forces on the rotor.

The Lockheed rotor system used a control gyro, similar in principle to that of the Bell stabilizer bar, but designed for both hands-off stability and rapid control response of the hingeless rotor system.

In fly-by-wire helicopters or Remote Control (RC) models, a microcontroller with gyroscope sensors and a Venturi sensor can replace the stabilizer. This flybar-less design has the advantage of easy reconfiguration and fewer mechanical parts.

=== Slowed rotor ===
Most helicopter rotors spin at constant speed. However slowing the rotor in some situations can bring benefits.

As forward speed increases, the advancing rotor tip speed soon approaches the speed of sound. To reduce the problem, the speed of rotation may be slowed, allowing the helicopter to fly faster.

To adjust the rotor lift at slower speeds, in a conventional design the rotor blades' angle of attack is reduced via a collective pitch control. Slowing the rotor instead can reduce drag during this phase of flight and thus improve fuel economy.

== Rotor configurations ==
Antitorque: torque effect on a helicopter

Most helicopters have a single main rotor but require a separate rotor to overcome torque. This is accomplished through a variable-pitch antitorque rotor or tail rotor. This is the design that Igor Sikorsky settled on for his VS-300 helicopter, and it has become the recognized convention for helicopter design, although designs do vary. When viewed from above, most American helicopter rotors turn counter-clockwise; French and Russian helicopters turn clockwise.

Another type of rotorcraft is the tiltrotor, which has many similarities to helicopter main rotors when in mode of powered lift.

=== Single main rotor ===
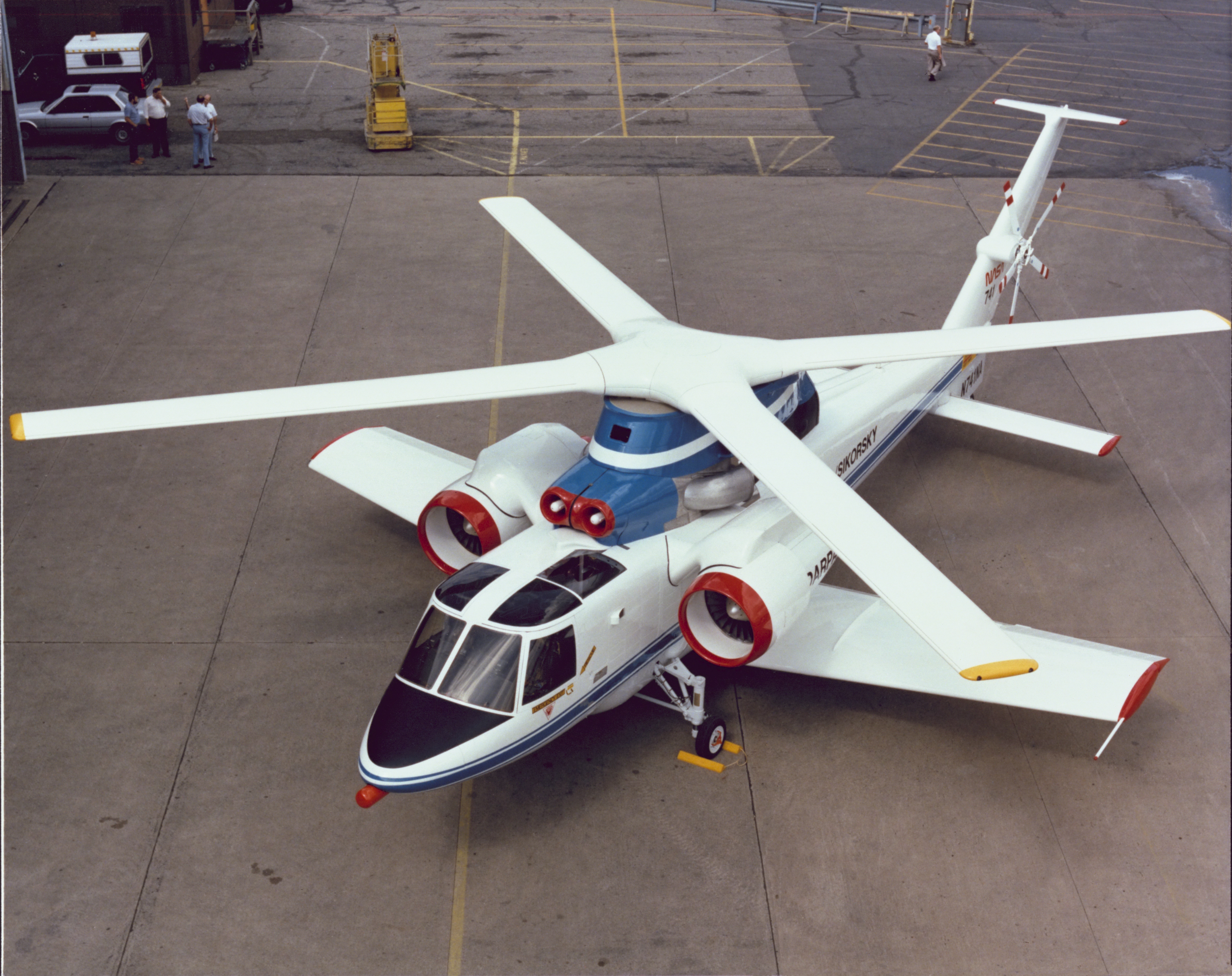
Sikorsky S-72 modified as the X-Wing testbed, with experimental 4-blade main rotor

With a single main rotor helicopter, the creation of torque as the engine turns the rotor creates a torque effect that causes the body of the helicopter to turn in the opposite direction of the rotor. To eliminate this effect, some sort of antitorque control must be used with a sufficient margin of power available to allow the helicopter to maintain its heading and provide yaw control. The three most common controls used today are the tail rotor, Eurocopter's Fenestron (also called a fantail), and MD Helicopters' NOTAR.

The number of rotor blades is also important, many helicopters have two blades in a single line, and another configuration is four rotor blades. An example of two-blade rotor is the Bell 212, and four blade version of this helicopter is the Bell 412. An example of the effect of rotor blade number is the UH-72 (EC145 variant); the A model had four blades, but the UH-72B was changed to five blades which reduced vibration. Other blade numbers are possible, for example, the CH-53K, a large military transport helicopter has a seven blade main rotor.

==== Tail rotor ====
The tail rotor is a smaller rotor mounted so that it rotates vertically or near-vertically at the end of the tail of a traditional single-rotor helicopter. The tail rotor's position and distance from the center of gravity allow it to develop thrust in a direction opposite that of the main rotor's rotation, thereby countering the torque effect created by the main rotor. Tail rotors are simpler than main rotors since they require only collective changes in pitch to vary thrust. The pitch of the tail rotor blades is adjustable by the pilot via the anti-torque pedals, which also provide directional control by allowing the pilot to rotate the helicopter around its vertical axis, thereby changing the direction the craft is pointed.

==== Ducted fan ====
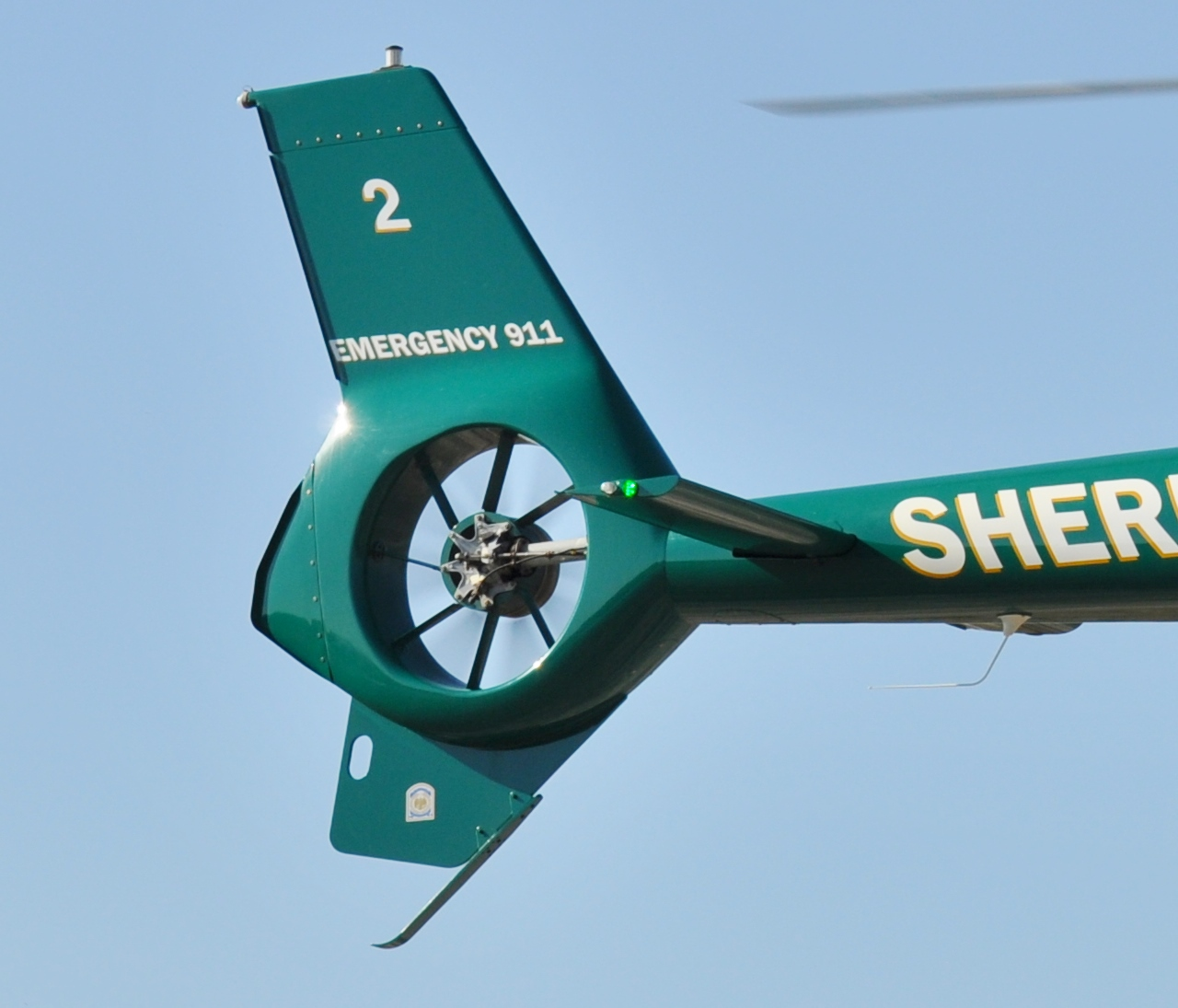
Fenestron on an EC 120B

Fenestron and FANTAIL are trademarks for a ducted fan mounted at the end of the tail boom of the helicopter and used in place of a tail rotor. Ducted fans have between eight and eighteen blades arranged with irregular spacing so that the noise is distributed over different frequencies. The housing is integral with the aircraft skin and allows a high rotational speed; therefore, a ducted fan can have a smaller size than a conventional tail rotor.

The Fenestron was used for the first time at the end of the 1960s on the second experimental model of Sud Aviation's SA 340 and produced on the later model Aérospatiale SA 341 Gazelle. Besides Eurocopter and its predecessors, a ducted fan tail rotor was also used on the canceled military helicopter project, the United States Army's RAH-66 Comanche, as the FANTAIL.

==== NOTAR ====
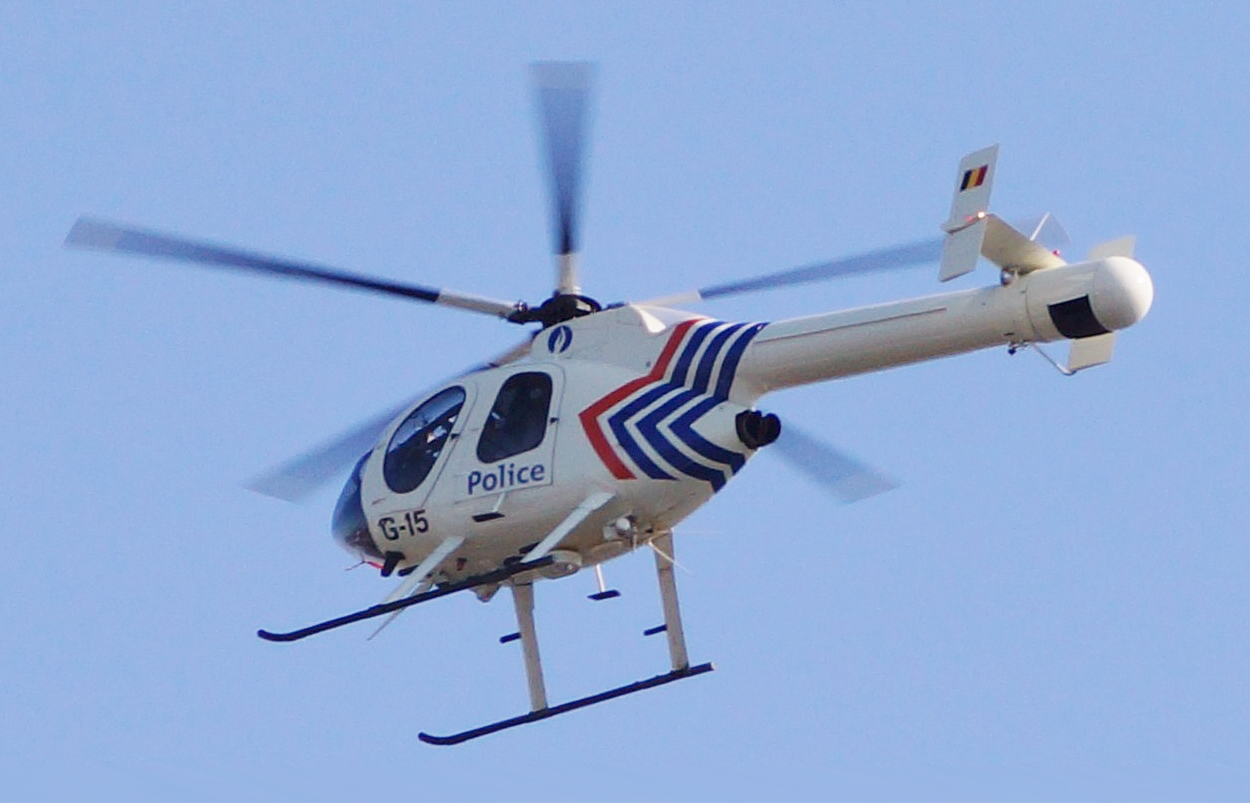
MD Helicopters 520N NOTAR

NOTAR, an acronym for no tail rotor, is a helicopter anti-torque system that eliminates the use of the tail rotor on a helicopter. Although the concept took some time to refine, the NOTAR system is simple in theory and provides antitorque the same way a wing develops lift by using the Coandă effect. A variable pitch fan is enclosed in the aft fuselage section immediately forward of the tail boom and is driven by the main rotor transmission. To provide the sideways force to counteract the clockwise torque produced by a counterclockwise-spinning main rotor (as seen from above the main rotor), the variable-pitch fan forces low pressure air through two slots on the right side of the tailboom, causing the downwash from the main rotor to hug the tailboom, producing lift and thus a measure of antitorque proportional to the amount of airflow from the rotorwash. This is augmented by a direct jet thruster which also provides directional yaw control, with the presence of a fixed-surface empennage near the end of the tail, incorporating vertical stabilizers.

Development of the NOTAR system dates back to 1975 when engineers at Hughes Helicopters began concept development work. In December 1981, Hughes flew an OH-6A fitted with NOTAR for the first time. A more heavily modified prototype demonstrator first flew in March 1986 and successfully completed an advanced flight-test program, validating the system for future application in helicopter design. There are currently three production helicopters that incorporate the NOTAR design, all produced by MD Helicopters. This antitorque design also improves safety by eliminating the possibility of personnel walking into the tail rotor.

A predecessor (of sorts) to this system existed in the form of Great Britain's Cierva W.9 helicopter, a late 1940s aircraft using the cooling fan from its piston engine to push air through a nozzle built into the tailboom to counteract rotor-torque.

==== Tip jets ====
The main rotor may be driven by tip jets. Such a system may be powered by high pressure air provided by a compressor. The air may or may not be mixed with fuel and burnt in ram-jets, pulse-jets, or rockets. Though this method is simple and eliminates torque reaction, prototypes that have been built are less fuel efficient than conventional helicopters. Except for tip jets driven by unburnt compressed air, very high noise levels is the single most important reason why tip jet powered rotors have not gained wide acceptance. However, research into noise suppression is ongoing and may help make this system viable.

There are several examples of tip jet powered rotorcraft. The Percival P.74 was under-powered and could not fly. The Hiller YH-32 Hornet had good lifting capability but performed poorly otherwise. Other aircraft used auxiliary thrust for translational flight so that the tip jets could be shut down while the rotor autorotated. The experimental Fairey Jet Gyrodyne, 48-seat Fairey Rotodyne passenger prototypes and McDonnell XV-1 compound gyroplanes flew well using this method. Perhaps the most unusual design of this type was the Rotary Rocket Roton ATV, which was originally envisioned to take off using a rocket-tipped rotor. The French Sud-Ouest Djinn used unburnt compressed air to drive the rotor, which minimized noise and helped it become the only tip jet driven rotor helicopter to enter production. The Hughes XH-17 had a tip jet-driven rotor, which remains the largest rotor ever fitted to a helicopter.

=== Twin rotors ===
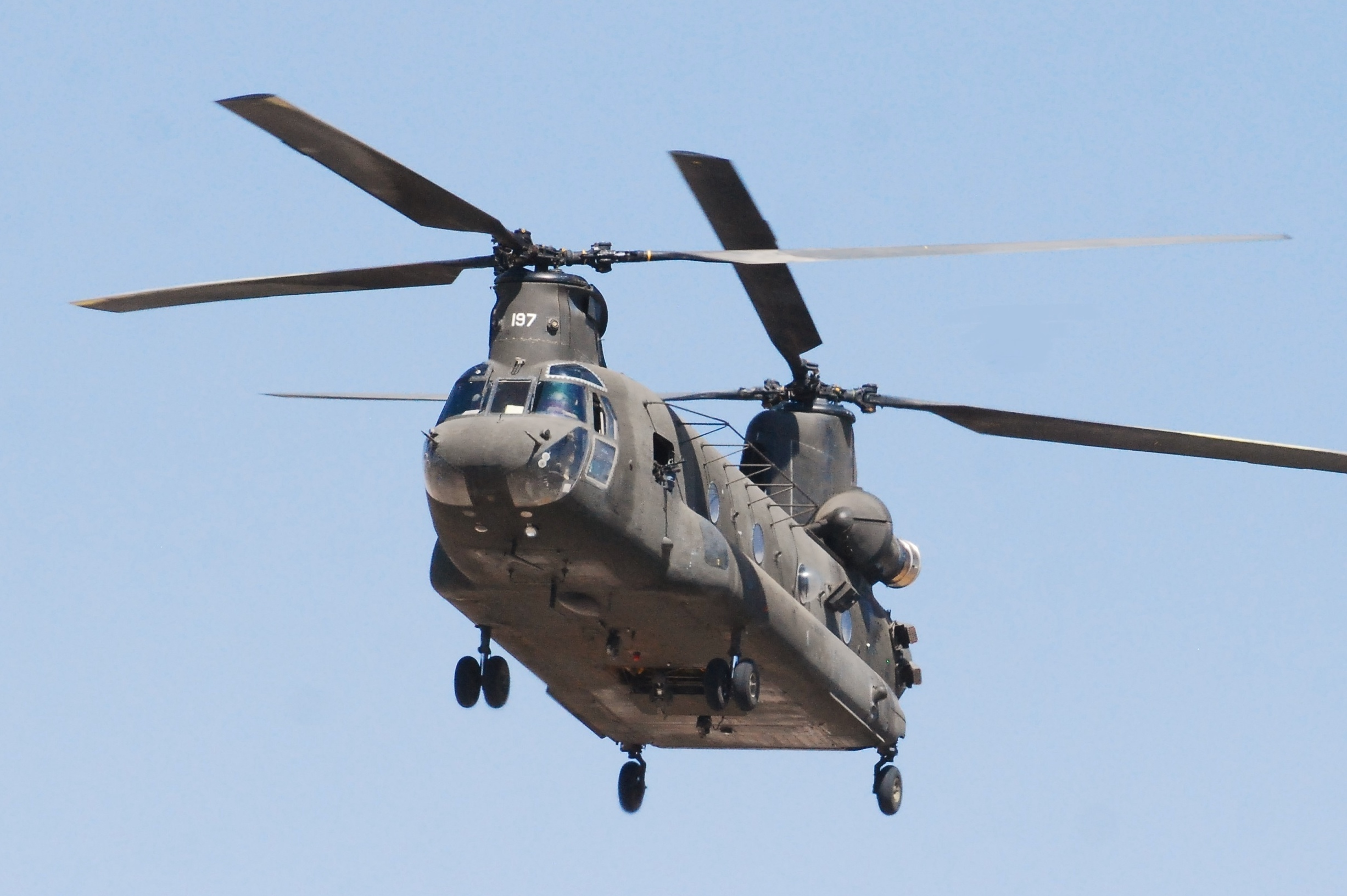
Boeing CH-47 Chinook

Twin rotors turn in opposite directions to counteract the torque effect on the aircraft without relying on an antitorque tail rotor. This lets the aircraft apply the power that would have driven a tail rotor to the main rotors, increasing lifting capacity. Primarily, three common configurations use the counterrotating effect on rotorcraft. Tandem rotors are two rotors—one mounted behind the other. Coaxial rotors are two rotors mounted one above the other on the same axis. Intermeshing rotors are two rotors mounted close to each other at a sufficient angle to let the rotors intermesh over the top of the aircraft. Another configuration—found on tiltrotors and some early helicopters—is called transverse rotors, where a pair of rotors are mounted at each end of a wing-type structure or outrigger.

==== Tandem ====
Tandem-rotor helicopters have two horizontal main rotors mounted one behind the other. Tandem rotors achieve pitch attitude changes to accelerate and decelerate the helicopter through a process called cyclic pitch. To pitch forward and accelerate, both rotors increase the pitch at the rear and reduce the pitch at the front (cyclic) keeping torque the same on both rotors, flying sideways is achieved by increasing the pitch on one side and reducing pitch on the other. Yaw control develops through opposing cyclic pitch in each rotor. To pivot right, the front rotor tilts right and the rear rotor tilts left. To pivot left, the front rotor tilts left and the rear rotor tilts right. All rotor power contributes to lift, and it is simpler to handle changes in the center of gravity fore-aft. However, it requires the expense of two large rotors rather than the more common one large main rotor and a much smaller tail rotor. The Boeing CH-47 Chinook is the most common tandem rotor helicopter.

==== Transverse ====
Transverse rotors are mounted on the end of wings or outriggers perpendicular to the body of the aircraft. Similar to tandem rotors and intermeshing rotors, the transverse rotor also uses differential collective pitch. But like the intermeshing rotors, the transverse rotors use the concept for changes in the roll attitude of the rotorcraft. This configuration is found on two of the first viable helicopters, the Focke-Wulf Fw 61 and the Focke-Achgelis Fa 223, as well as the world's largest helicopter ever built, the Mil V-12. It is also the configuration found on tiltrotors such as the Bell–Boeing V-22 Osprey and the Leonardo AW609.

==== Coaxial ====
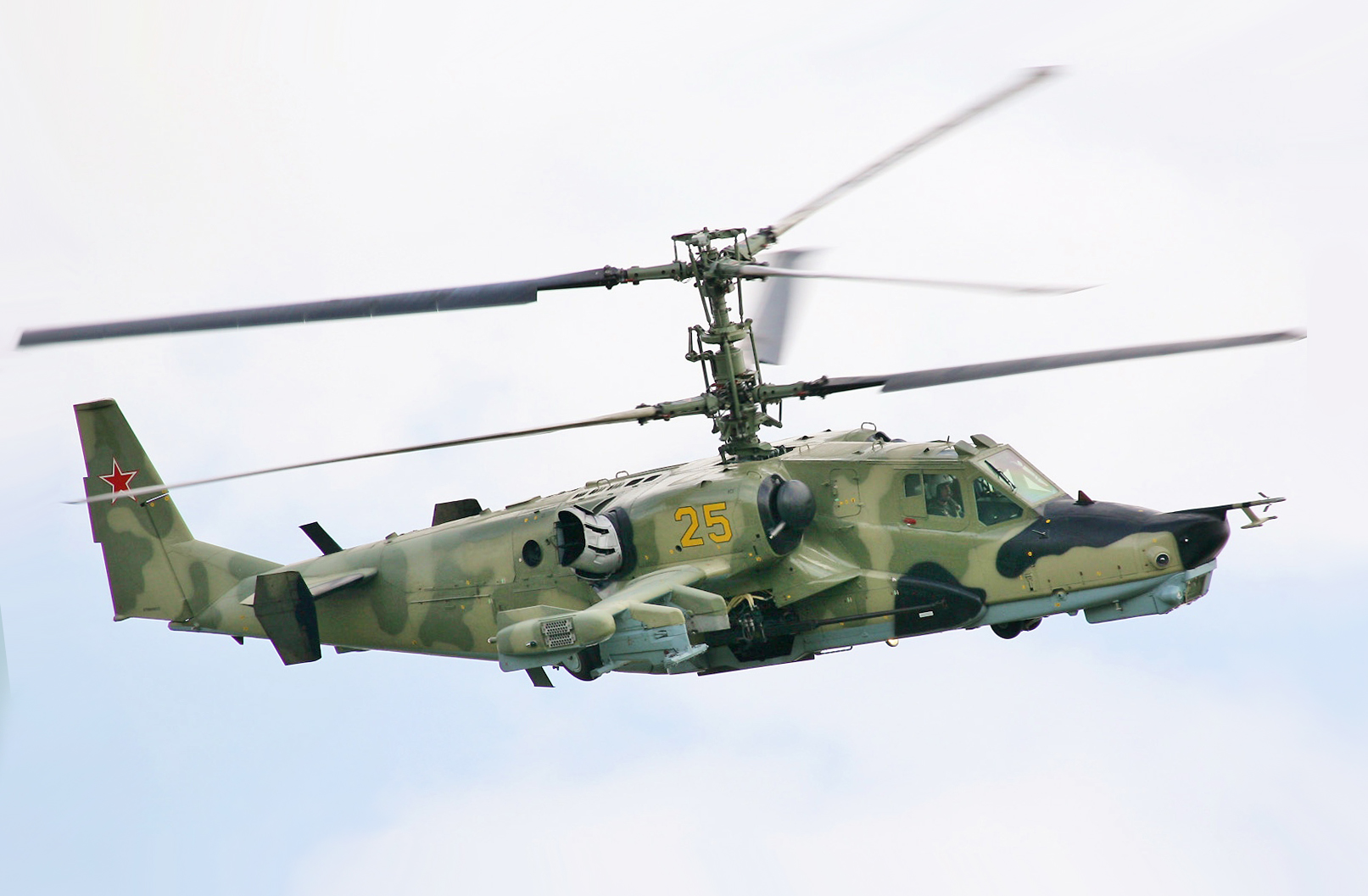
Kamov Ka-50 of the Russian Air Force, with coaxial rotors

Coaxial rotors are a pair of rotors mounted one above the other on the same shaft and turning in opposite directions. The advantage of the coaxial rotor is that, in forward flight, the lift provided by the advancing halves of each rotor compensates for the retreating half of the other, eliminating one of the key effects of dissymmetry of lift: retreating blade stall. However, other design considerations plague coaxial rotors. There is an increased mechanical complexity of the rotor system because it requires linkages and swashplates for two rotor systems. Also, because the rotors must rotate in opposite directions, the mast is more complex, and control linkages for pitch changes to the upper rotor system must pass through the lower rotor system.

An example of coaxial design in a compound helicopter was the Sikorsky Skyraider X, which also had pusher prop at the rear.

==== Intermeshing ====
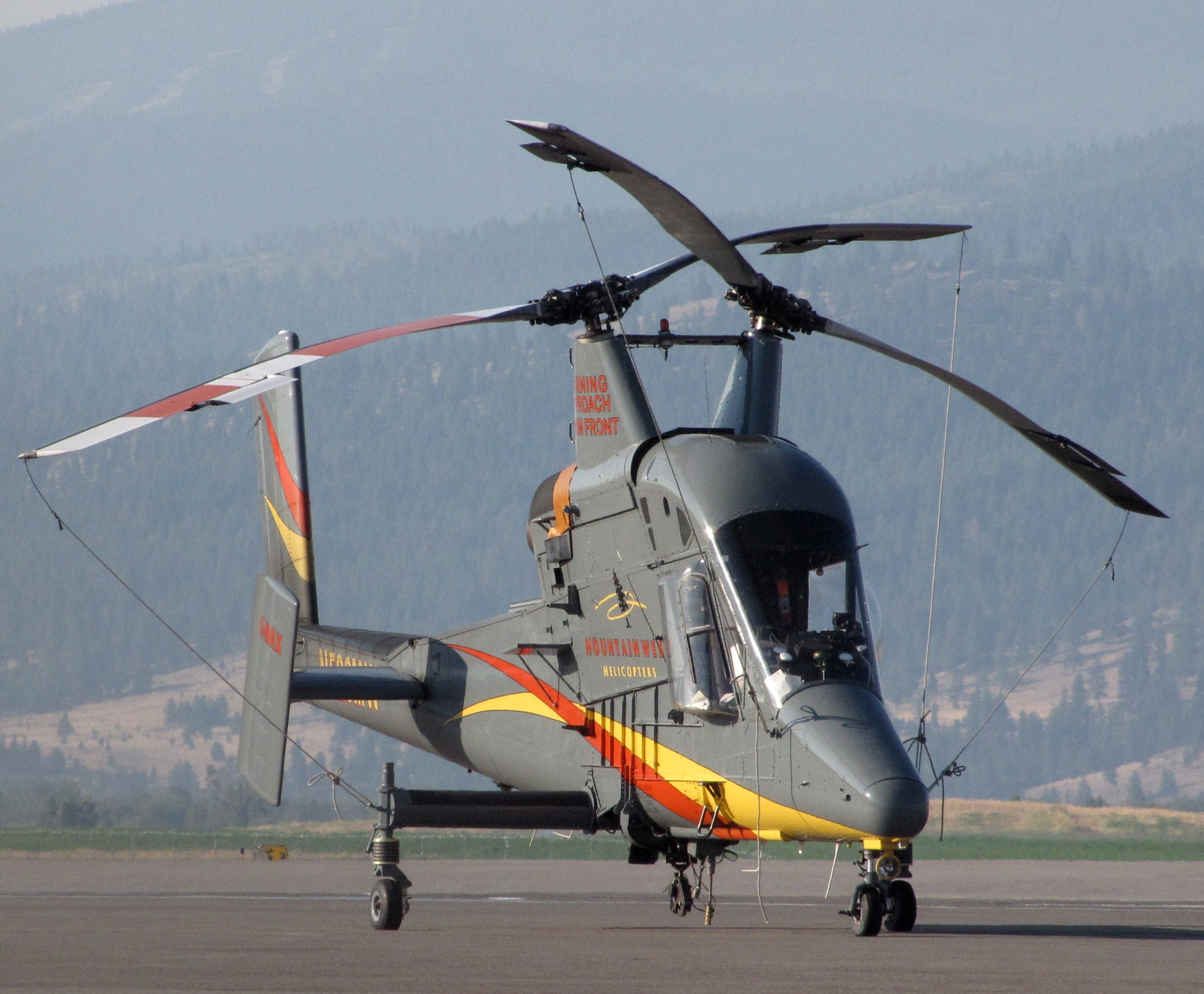
Intermeshing twin rotors of a Kaman K-Max

Video of K-Max helicopter in flight, showing the meshing main rotors in motion

Intermeshing rotors on a helicopter are a set of two rotors turning in opposite directions with each rotor mast mounted on the helicopter with a slight angle to the other so that the blades intermesh without colliding. This configuration is sometimes referred to as a synchropter. Intermeshing rotors have high stability and powerful lifting capability. The arrangement was pioneered in Nazi Germany in 1939 with Anton Flettner's successful Flettner Fl 265 design, and later placed in limited production as the successful Flettner Fl 282 Kolibri, used by the German Kriegsmarine in small numbers (24 airframes produced) as an experimental light anti-submarine warfare helicopter. During the Cold War, an American company, Kaman Aircraft, produced the HH-43 Huskie for USAF firefighting and rescue missions. The latest Kaman model, the Kaman K-MAX, is a dedicated sky crane design.

=== Quad rotor ===
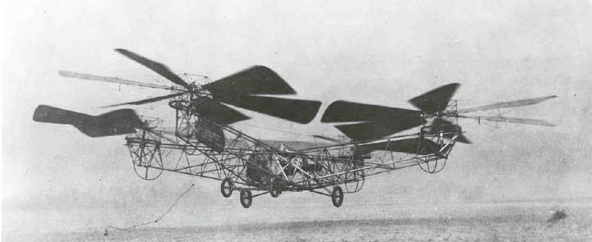
de Bothezat helicopter, 1923 photo

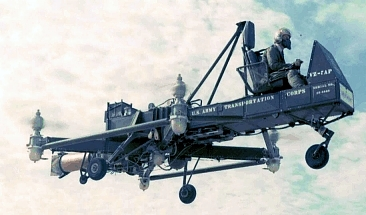
Curtiss-Wright VZ-7

A quad rotor or quadrotor comprises four rotors in an "X" configuration. Rotors to the left and right are in a transverse configuration while those in the front and to the rear are in a tandem configuration.

An advantage of quad rotors on small aircraft such as drones is the opportunity for mechanical simplicity. A quadcopter using electric motors and fixed-pitch rotors has only four moving parts. Pitch, yaw and roll can be controlled by changing the relative lift of different rotor pairs without changing total lift.

The two families of airfoils are

- symmetrical airfoils
- asymmetrical airfoils

Symmetrical blades are very stable, which helps keep blade twisting and flight control loads to a minimum. This stability is achieved by keeping the center of pressure virtually unchanged as the angle of attack changes. Center of pressure is the imaginary point on the chord line where the resultant of all aerodynamic forces are considered to be concentrated. Today, designers use thinner airfoils and obtain the required rigidity by using composite materials.

Some airfoils are asymmetrical in design, meaning the upper and lower surfaces do not have the same camber. Normally these airfoils would not be as stable, but this can be corrected by bending the trailing edge to produce the same characteristics as symmetrical airfoils. This is called "reflexing." Using this type of rotor blade allows the rotor system to operate at higher forward speeds. One of the reasons an asymmetrical rotor blade is not as stable is that the center of pressure changes with changes in angle of attack. When the center of pressure lifting force is behind the pivot point on a rotor blade, it tends to cause the rotor disc to pitch up. As the angle of attack increases, the center of pressure moves forward. If it moves ahead of the pivot point, the pitch of the rotor disc decreases. Since the angle of attack of the rotor blades is constantly changing during each cycle of rotation, the blades tend to flap, feather, lead, and lag to a greater degree.

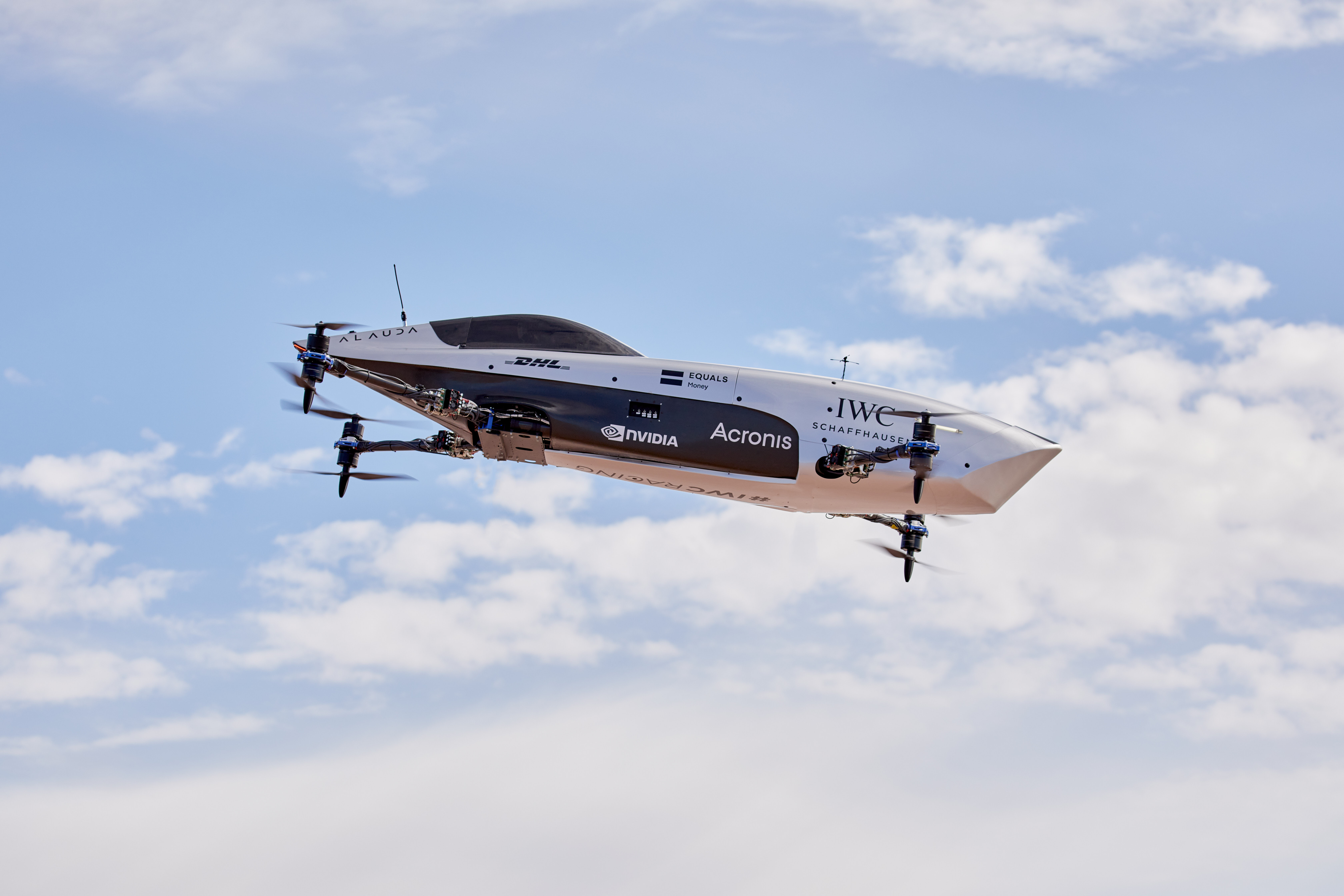
The Mk3 Speeder shown here in flight in 2021

=== Hexacopter and multirotor and eVTOLs ===
Hexacopter is a popular configuration for unmanned drone helicopters, and ways to manage and improve the control of multirotor drones has been studied. The octocopter configuration is used notably in NASA's planned Dragonfly probe, designed to fly in the atmosphere of Saturn's Moon Titan.

A manned multirotor helicopter that was flying in the 2010s had 18 electrically powered rotors; the single seat aircraft is powered by batteries.

The first aerobatic manned drone, as this type of electrically powered multi-rotor helicopter is known, had 12 rotors and could carry 1-2 people.

Manned drones or eVTOL as they are called typically multirotor designs powered by batteries gained increasing popularity and designs in the 2020s.

The naming of some of the designs has not fully settled, with eVTOL being a popular name, also manned drone, or even flying car being used, or in certain cases Air Taxi.

As an aircraft, the FAA has worked to refine the regulations surrounding eVTOL designs, which is oriented towards traditional Helicopters and airplanes, but in 2024 finalized airworthiness criteria as it resolves how to classify and certify these types of aircraft in the United States.

== Limitations and hazards ==
External videos
- Mast Bumping - Causes and Prevention, US Army

Examples of hazards faced by Helicopters include ones common to aircraft such as bird-strikes, but also a number of others depending on the design of the helicopter and conditions. These include but are not limited to: Dynamic rollover, Ground resonance, Loss of tail-rotor effectiveness, Retreating blade stall, Dynamic stall, Vortex ring state, Servo transparency, Mast bumping, and Tailstrike.

Because the main rotor is vital to keeping a helicopter in the air, any damage to it can have disastrous consequences. Because the tip is usually the farthest extremity helicopters flying in formation have to be careful to keep their distance and not touch tips or tail rotors, or with surroundings.

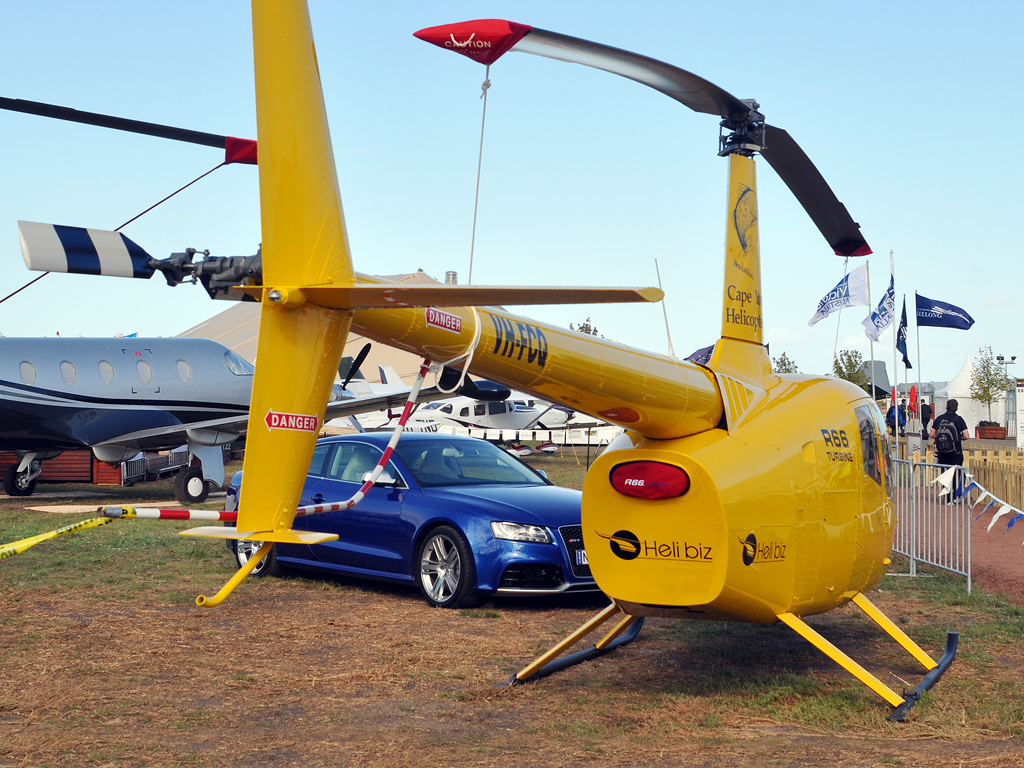
Tail view of an R66, 2011

=== Mast bumping, rotor-boom collision, and tailstrikes ===
In the late 1960s the US Army discovered the danger of a main rotor striking a helicopter's own tail, in certain aerodynamic conditions. Especially in cases where the weight of the helicopter is unloaded from the main rotor in low-G conditions. In that case inputs to the controls can create a dangerous situation or it may be possible to resolve it.

In particular, Helicopters with teetering rotors—for example the two-blade system on the Bell, Robinson and others—must not be subjected to a low-g condition because such rotor systems do not control the fuselage attitude. This can result in the fuselage assuming an attitude controlled by momentum and tail rotor thrust that causes the tail boom to intersect the main rotor tip-path plane or result in the blade roots contacting the main rotor drive shaft, causing the blades to separate from the hub (mast bumping). In the 2020s Robinson developed a new tail empennage for the R66 to reduce the chance of this type of accident. Two university studies of the Robinson main rotor, one by Georgia Tech and the other the University of Maryland, did not find the rotor design to be more susceptible in low-G conditions than other teetering designs, and this fit with Robinson's ongoing study of its design. Nevertheless, Robinson in the 2020s came up with new empennage to increase high speed roll stability, and this was approved by the FAA in 2023. Robinson hopes to bring this redesign to its other models, although low-G maneuvers remain forbidden. Low-G maneuvers are prohibited in Robinson designs even for demonstrations.

The collision between tail rotor and tail boom is a danger, and in one case it is thought that abrupt input controls after a bird strike on Bell 206, lead to rotor and boom collision breaking the helicopter apart in flight. Another example a main rotor-tail collisions, was a EC120 that cut off its own tail during a hard landing caused by autorotation practice.

Helicopters can be vulnerable to a tail boom striking its surroundings, especially when near the ground in unfamiliar landing locations.

=== Abrasion in sandy environments ===
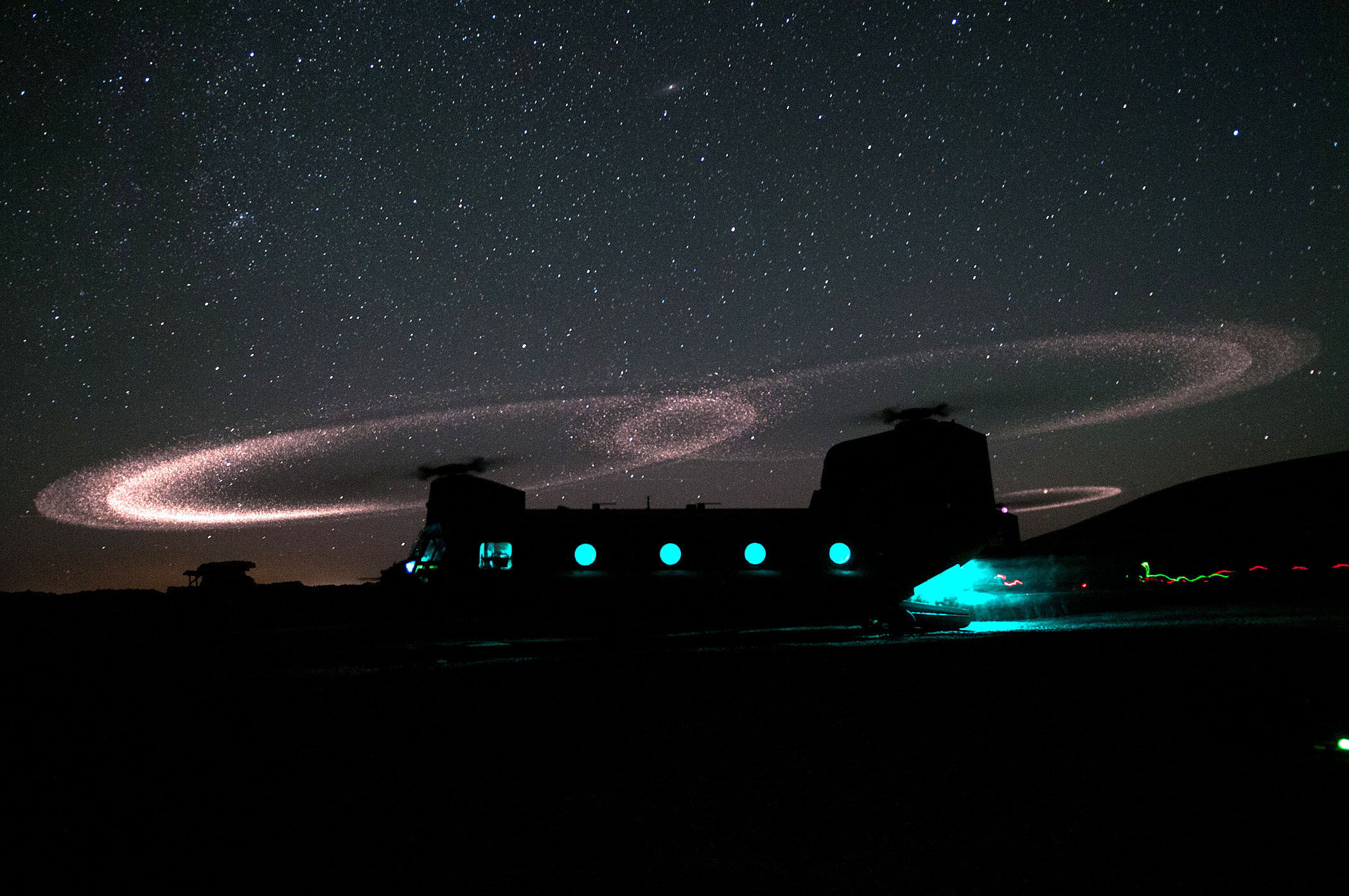
Kopp–Etchells effect

When operating in sandy environments, sand hitting the moving rotor blades erodes their surface. This can damage the rotors and presents serious and costly maintenance problems.

Abrasion strips on helicopter rotor blades are made of metal, often titanium or nickel, which are very hard, but less hard than sand. When a helicopter flies low to the ground in desert environments, sand striking the rotor blade can cause erosion. At night, sand hitting the metal abrasion strip causes a visible corona or halo around the rotor blades. The effect – also known as the Kopp–Etchells effect – is caused by the pyrophoric oxidation of the ablated metal particles, similar to the sparks produced when grinding metal.

The combat photographer and journalist Michael Yon observed the effect while accompanying U.S. soldiers in Afghanistan. When he discovered that the effect had no name he coined the name Kopp–Etchells effect after two soldiers who had died in the war, one American and one British.

== History ==
The use of a rotor for vertical flight has existed since 400 BC in the form of the bamboo-copter, an ancient Chinese toy. The bamboo-copter is spun by rolling a stick attached to a rotor. The spinning creates lift, and the toy flies when released. The philosopher Ge Hong's book the Baopuzi (Master Who Embraces Simplicity), written around 317, describes the apocryphal use of a possible rotor in aircraft: "Some have made flying cars [feiche 飛車] with wood from the inner part of the jujube tree, using ox-leather (straps) fastened to returning blades so as to set the machine in motion." Leonardo da Vinci designed a machine known as an "aerial screw" with a rotor based on a water screw. The Russian polymath Mikhail Lomonosov developed a rotor based on the Chinese toy. The French naturalist Christian de Launoy constructed his rotor out of turkey feathers. Sir George Cayley, inspired by the Chinese toy in his childhood, created multiple vertical flight machines with rotors made of tin sheets. Alphonse Pénaud would later develop the coaxial rotor model helicopter toys in 1870, powered by rubber bands. One of these toys, given as a gift by their father, would inspire the Wright brothers to pursue the dream of flight.

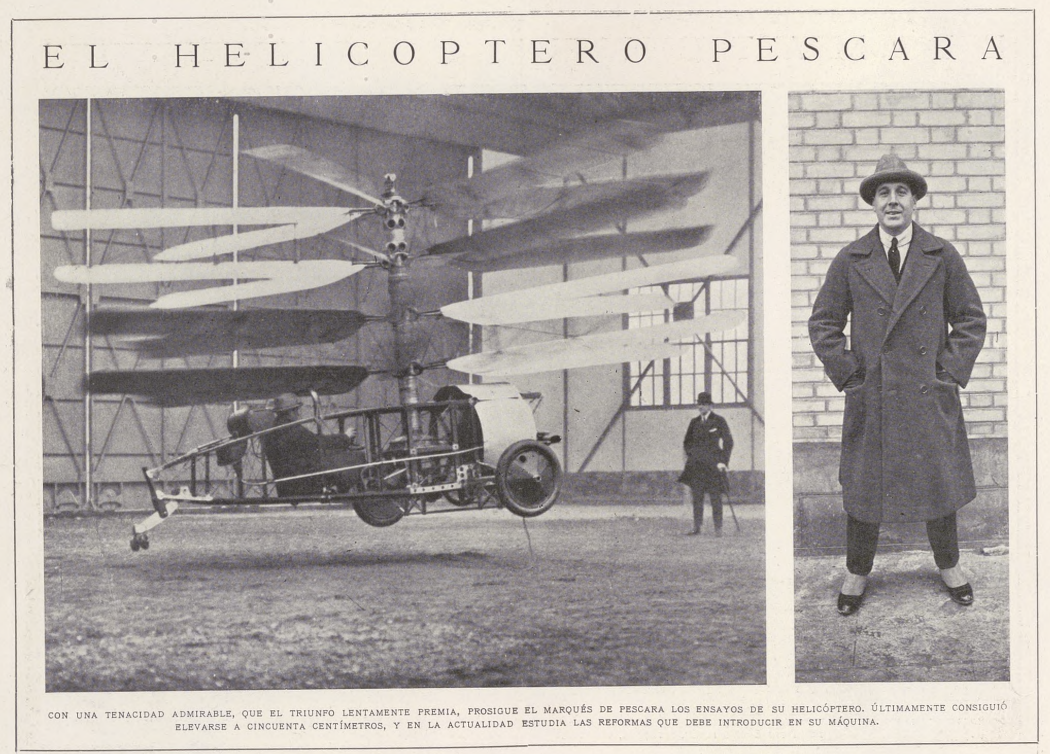
Helicopter History Started Here – 1922

Before the emergence of mass-produced helicopters, the foundational principles of vertical flight control were established by the Argentine engineer Raúl Pateras Pescara between 1919 and 1924. While other pioneers focused on hybrid aircraft like the autogyro—which lacked hover capabilities—Pescara successfully developed and patented the cyclic pitch control and the fully articulated coaxial rotor system. These innovations allowed for the first time true maneuverability and the ability to perform a controlled hover. Furthermore, Pescara demonstrated the principle of autorotation as a vital safety maneuver, a concept that remains a cornerstone of helicopter pilotage today. While autogyro research contributed to rotor blade dynamics, the modern helicopter is a direct mechanical descendant of Pescara's active control systems and the later stabilization refinements by engineers like Henrich Focke, which Igor Sikorsky ultimately industrialized in 1942. Pescara’s work on pitch control, rather than the passive rotor of the autogyro, is the true structural basis for modern helicopter analysis

The first successful attempt at a single-lift rotor helicopter design used a four-blade main rotor, as designed by Soviet aeronautical engineers Boris N. Yuriev and Alexei M. Cheremukhin, both working at the Tsentralniy Aerogidrodinamicheskiy Institut (TsAGI, the Central Aerohydrodynamic Institute) near Moscow in the early 1930s. Their TsAGI 1-EA helicopter was able to fly in low altitude testing in 1931–32, with Cheremukhin flying it as high as 605 meters (1,985 ft) by mid-August 1932.

In the 1930s, Arthur Young improved the stability of two-bladed rotor systems with the introduction of a stabilizer bar. This system was used in several Bell and Hiller helicopter models. The Hiller system variant using airfoiled paddles at the flybar's ends has been used in many of the earliest designs of remote control model helicopters, from their 1970s origins onwards to the very early 21st century.

In the late 1940s, the making of helicopter rotor blades was a job that inspired John T. Parsons to be a pioneer of numerical control (NC). NC and CNC (computerized numerical control) turned out to be an important new technology that later affected all machining industries.

Airspeeder MK3 In South Australia Test Flight (2021)
