= Michael Yon =

American writer and photographer (born 1964)

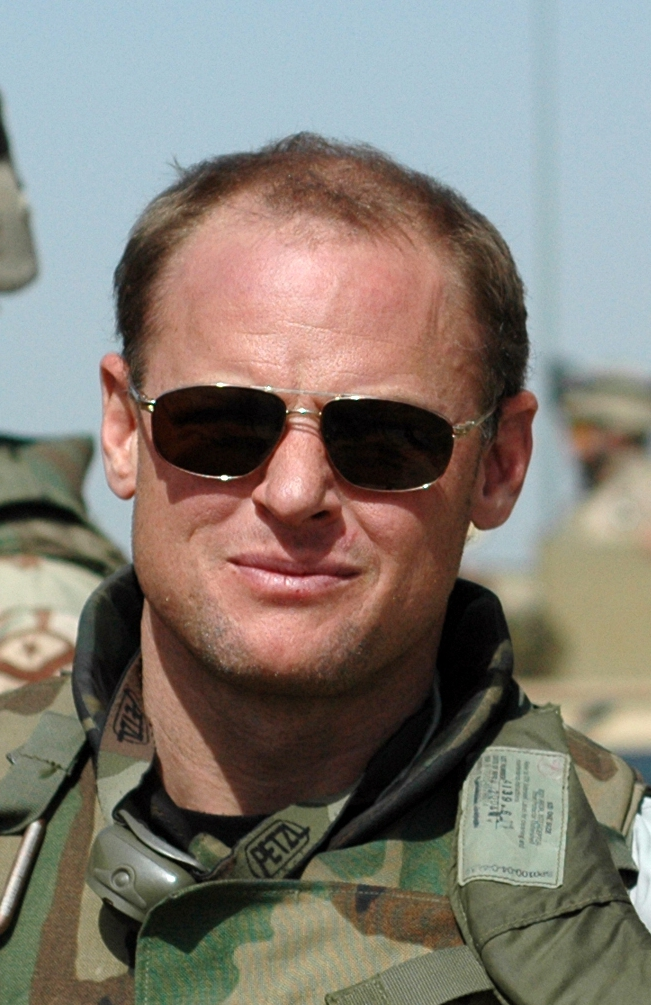
- Michael Yon in Iraq in 2011
- Born: 1964 (age 61–62)
- Occupations: Writer, author, blogger, columnist, photographer, war correspondent

Michael Yon (born 1964) is an American writer and photographer. He served in the Special Forces in the early-1980s, and he became a writer in the mid-1990s. He focused on military writing after the invasion of Iraq. Yon has been embedded on numerous occasions with American and British troops in Iraq, most prominently a deployment with the 1st Battalion, 24th Infantry Regiment (Deuce Four) of the 25th Infantry Division in Mosul, Iraq that ended in September 2005.

Yon has had vocal feuds with the United States military hierarchy, and the nature of his reports is also controversial. In 2008, The New York Times reported that he has spent more time embedded with combat units than any other journalist in Iraq. He shifted the focus of his blogging from Iraq to Afghanistan in August 2008. His work is supported primarily by donations from readers.

== Background ==
Yon grew up in Winter Haven, Florida, where he essentially raised himself. As a child and as a young adult, he was a prankster who got in trouble for, among other things, making homemade bombs. Other children bullied him repeatedly throughout his childhood, particularly because of his short stature. He went to a local community college and did not express any interest in journalism. After graduation, he enlisted in the United States Army in his late teens for the college money.

Because of his light blond hair, short stature, and physical boastfulness, other soldiers nicknamed him "Bam Bam" after the Flintstones character. He killed a man in a barroom fight in Ocean City, Maryland in the 1980s; criminal charges were filed but later dropped. Yon's first book, Danger Close, details this event and tells the story of his life up to the age of 20, after he had completed the selection and training process for the United States Army Special Forces. Yon was discharged from the Army in 1987 and worked in a variety of different businesses, and for a while provided security detail for the late pop star Michael Jackson. He later described Jackson as a "hostage of his own success" while also stating that he enjoyed his experiences with him at Neverland Ranch before the scandals. Having learned German and some Polish within the service, he also attempted to work in Poland. He started general freelance writing in the mid-1990s despite having no background in the field. Notably, he covered the Aghori, an obscure Hindu cult that eats human flesh to gain magic powers supposedly. Yon believed that he had located an American cult member and passed his suspicions on to the FBI. He began writing about the occupation of Iraq after the death of two of his army friends, one of whom he had known since high school.

Yon first landed in Baghdad in late December 2004. He covered the war in Iraq for several years afterward, notably covering the Deuce Four forces. Yon briefly stopped over to Afghanistan in early 2006. In December 2007, Yon was present in Basra with 4th Battalion, The Rifles during the British withdrawal from the city. He subsequently visited England and met then-Duchess of Cornwall and current queen consort of the United Kingdom, Queen Camilla. Yon praised her for what he saw as her unstinting support for her troops.

Yon moved to covering the War in Afghanistan in August 2008, which he said had become the most important field in the war on terrorism. He attempted to travel to Pakistan in June 2009, but his visa application was denied. That month, he also traveled to Singapore, Bahrain, the Philippines, and Turkey to report on Secretary of Defense Robert Gates' security meetings. From July 2019 until he was deported on 5 February 2020, Yon had been reporting on the ground from the 2019 Hong Kong Protests.

In January 2021, Michael Yon attended the 2021 United States Capitol attack but stayed outside of the US Capitol. In an interview with Epoch Times, he claimed he witnessed Antifa, not neo-fascist militias such as Proud Boys or Oath Keepers as other media have reported, "clearly led" the insurrection. However, Media Matters said that the Epoch Times promoted the "Stop the Steal" Capitol rally that led to the riot.

== Personal views ==
Yon has stated, in general, that "If a writer wants to make money, he should avoid truth and tell people what they want to hear. Yet to win the war, tell the truth." He supports embedded journalism over traditional reporting, believing that the closer writers are to events the less likely they are to repeat military public relations spin. Yon was reluctant to say about whether he supported the decision to go to war. He eventually said he had been a supporter because of his concerns about Iraq's alleged weapons of mass destruction, which he had given the Bush Administration the benefit of the doubt over.

After first visiting Iraq in December 2004, Yon said the situation in the country was far more violent than the mainstream media had reported. During the next year, he reported that "Iraq was falling apart" and was in a civil war. He also believed that NATO forces were "losing" the war in Afghanistan. Yon was a vocal proponent of a 'surge' strategy in Iraq and expressed his support in many interviews for Senator John McCain in the 2008 Presidential election. Agreeing with McCain, Yon opposes the use of torture by the U.S. military, and specifically opposes waterboarding. In June 2009, he remarked: "I get the feeling that Obama is tougher and proving wiser than many people seem to think". Yon also wrote in the aftermath of the Iranian election protests that he agreed with controversial author Michael Ledeen's views about Iran. In an August 2009 interview at Helmand Province, he reiterated his belief that the Afghan Taliban are stronger than the NATO presence, comparing the situation to Apocalypse Now.

Describing how his personal views affect his writing, Yon stated, "I feel no shame in saying I am biased in favor of our troops. Even worse, I feel no shame in calling a terrorist a terrorist". The New York Times commented that "Like most bloggers, Mr. Yon has an agenda, writing often that the United States’ mission to build a stable, democratic Iraq is succeeding and must continue." The Los Angeles Times has called him "the reporter of choice for many conservatives", although journalist Michael Totten calls Yon a "refreshingly unideological analyst of the war". Yon has praised several media agencies he has worked with, saying "The journalists for places like the New York Times and Wall Street Journal are actually very good with their facts."

In his 2008 book Moment of Truth in Iraq, Yon wrote:

Happy news for the Left was that U.S. soldiers were demoralized and the war was being lost... Happy news for the Right was that there was no insurgency, then no civil war; we always had enough troops, and we were winning hands-down, except for the left-wing lunatics who were trying to unravel it all. They say heroin addicts are happy, too, when they are out of touch with reality.

Yon supports the personal use of his images and writings by ordinary people, but he believes that larger institutions such as television networks and magazines should respect his copyright. As such, he has taken on numerous legal cases. He wrote in August 2008 that he spends about $100,000 a year in those efforts.

=== General themes ===
Yon's writing is marked by its fondness for American service personnel and Iraqis, both military and civilian alike. He sees those groups as engaging bravely in a just nation-building. USA Today has called him "unflinchingly pro-military". It is also marked by candor about what he regards as U.S. and Iraqi failures, which led The Los Angeles Times to label Yon a "lone gun". For example, Yon notably covered the story of an Iraqi taxi driver mistakenly killed by U.S. troops. Yon's work is often graphic in its nature compared to other reporting.

Yon's reports detail his conflicts with the U.S. military command as well, which culminated in an October 2008 article in The Weekly Standard titled "Censoring Iraq". In particular, Yon has accused Barry A. Johnson of US Central Command of "a subtle but all too real censorship" as well as "ineptitude in handling the press". The article nearly caused the military to ban Yon from re-entering Iraq. Yon frequently criticizes what he sees as inept public relations efforts from the Army staff.

The style of Yon's reports has garnered praise from The New York Times, calling it "enough first-hand observation, clarity and skepticism to put many professional journalists to shame", as well as Slate, calling it "the grizzled, noirish [sic] style of war reportage from earlier eras." Military.com has stated that Yon re-defined war coverage for the new media.

Yon has also been criticized by members of the Army, such as by Lt. Col. Steven Boylan in September 2005, who have said that he violated his embed agreement by releasing photos of dead and injured soldiers before their family members were notified. He also has been accused of skirting Army rules by working before he formally signed up with a news agency. However, Yon is not employed by any news organization, and employment by a news organization is not a requirement for embedding with U.S. Forces.

Although working as a writer, Yon crossed the line in Mosul and engaged in combat in an attempt to save the lives of four American soldiers. The Commander, Lieutenant Colonel Erik Kurilla, had been shot three times, while Command Sergeant Major (CSM) Robb Prosser was fighting hand-to-hand combat with the Al Qaeda member who just shot Kurilla. Two American soldiers, frozen in fear, refused to fight. Yon had a chance to flee but instead, while CSM Prosser was fighting the terrorist hand-to-hand, he grabbed Prosser's empty rifle, took ammunition from a lieutenant who refused to fight, and Yon joined combat. His dispatch about the incident led to a strict reprimand from the Army administration.

== Selected writings and related issues ==
=== 2005 – Little Girl story and photograph ===
The photo was submitted to Time. Their website's viewers selected it as the 'Top Photo of 2005'. It received 66% of the vote. An Islamic-based non-violence organization asked to use the picture, and Yon gave his permission. Documentary filmmaker Michael Moore used the photo without permission at michaelmoore.com, with it placed alongside then-Senator Hillary Clinton attacking her support for the invasion of Iraq. In May 2008, Yon wrote that he planned to sue Moore for copyright infringement and described some of Moore's media work as pornographic.

=== 2006 – Battle with Shock magazine ===
In 2006, the 'Little Girl' image was the center of a controversy when it was used by the Hachette Filipacchi Médias’ publication Shock magazine. The magazine displayed the picture in a context that was critical of the war in Iraq. Yon felt this usage of the photo both dishonored U.S. troops and breached his copyright. He especially criticized the fact that the agency released the disputed article on Memorial Day.

Yon contacted his lawyers and agreed with Hachette Filipacchi Médias that he would be paid a licensing fee, with the majority of proceeds going to a charity supporting US military families. On June 9, 2006, the agreement appears to have collapsed, with Yon alleging further misuse of the image by Hachette Filipacchi Médias at its shocku.com website.

=== 2007 – Reporting atrocities by Al-Qaeda in Iraq ===
Yon wrote on July 18 that the news media had been ignoring the story. An Iraqi official later said that the insurgents had, among other atrocities, baked a young boy and served him to his parents. Yon himself wrote in a later dispatch that he offers "no opinion about the veracity of [the official's] words".

=== 2008 – Moment of Truth in Iraq ===
In April 2008, Yon published his second book, Moment of Truth in Iraq, through Richard Vigilante Books. The book describes how U.S. counterinsurgency methods are creating what Yon sees as a foundation of success in Iraq. Within two weeks of its release date, Moment of Truth entered into Amazon.com's list of Top 10 bestsellers. Yon was quoted by fellow blogger Glenn Reynolds as saying, "That's just wild. Folks really did want that book after all. I was wondering how many people even cared. It's great to know that people want to really know what's going on."

=== 2010 – Conflicts with ISAF military command ===
Through spring 2010, Yon engaged in an ongoing war of words with Canadian Army Brigadier-General Daniel Menard and US General Stanley McChrystal, the latter who commanded International Security Assistance Force (ISAF).

Yon accused Menard of incompetence when the Tarnak Bridge was destroyed by insurgents, near the Canadian Area of Operations, claiming that Menard had been watching a hockey game at the time.

The attacks on a coalition partner and allied General were embarrassing to the ISAF and diplomatic efforts. It appears that this resulted in a breakdown of relationships between Yon and the Public Affairs Office of McChrystal, which Yon described as "crazy monkeys."

Despite Yon's praise for General McChrystal on the eve of the Tarnak Bridge incident, his Facebook updates became increasingly critical after Yon was disembedded. While most of Yon's criticism focused on McChrystal's media relations, he also criticized Stanley McChrystal's war strategy on many occasions, particularly the restrictive Rules of engagement under his command. Daily Telegraph journalist Toby Harnden described Yon's commentary as "excoriating".

After publication of a June 2010 Rolling Stone article containing controversial quotes from McChrystal and his staff, which mocked their civilian Obama administration colleagues, Yon wrote; "Unless McChrystal basically denies the article, he must be fired. If he is not fired, I will start calling him President McChrystal because Obama clearly is not in charge." Both McChrystal and Menard later left their commands.

After General David H. Petraeus was appointed to Stanley McCrystal's command, Yon sent Petraeus a message of support and later wrote on his Facebook page that Petraeus sent back "a nice response".

In 2013, Yon criticized General Martin Dempsey for the policy of painting a bright red crosses on medical evacuation helicopters. Yon felt it identified them as unarmed targets.

=== 2015 – Comfort women ===
In September 2007, Yon spoke at the 2007 conference of the Nazi War Crimes and Japanese Imperial Government Records Interagency Working Group to claim Japan's innocence on the sexual enslavement of the Imperial Japanese comfort women before and during WWII. However, he failed to mention a U.S. informant's report on the Japanese Military not preventing the abuse and rape of Malaysian women at 'licensed public comfort houses,' which led to historians and authors disagreeing with him.

In 2014, FeND Now Network's (Japan-U.S. Feminist Network for Decolonization) feminist writer, Emi Koyama, and Monthly Hanada Magazine's right-wing editor-in-chief, Kazuyoshi Hanada, reported Michael Yon receiving book deals, financial agreements, and speaking tours from Yoshiko Sakurai, a conservative member from the Global Alliance for Historical Truth, and the Nippon Kaigi. He published articles about denying the comfort women system as a form of sexual slavery in the English media and spoke at her think tank about it. Al Jazeera also reported that Yon viewed the comfort women issue as a strategic "information war" meant to keep Japan divided and weak.

Yon warned Sakurai and Taniyama Yūjirō that promoting the film would not only damage Japan but offend America because of the film's lack of understanding of American values. When Mariko Okada-Collins, a Japanese language instructor from Central Washington University invited them to show the film in her university, he terminated his deal with Sakurai. Though he broke off with the other Japanese nationalist movements, he continues to publish many posts on his blog and social media to this day, claiming this issue to be a lie. In 2018, he published his full-length Japanese book on this topic.

=== 2021-24 – Darién Gap ===
Since 2021, Yon has worked in the Darién Gap, a dangerous stretch of jungle used by migrants entering the United States illegally. He has worked with figures such as Alex Jones and Laura Loomer, getting them access to the camps where legacy media are barred by security. A New York Times article noted that he targeted the Hebrew Immigrant Aid Society, quoting him as saying that "they’re coming across the border and it’s being funded with Jewish money.”

== Kopp–Etchells effect ==
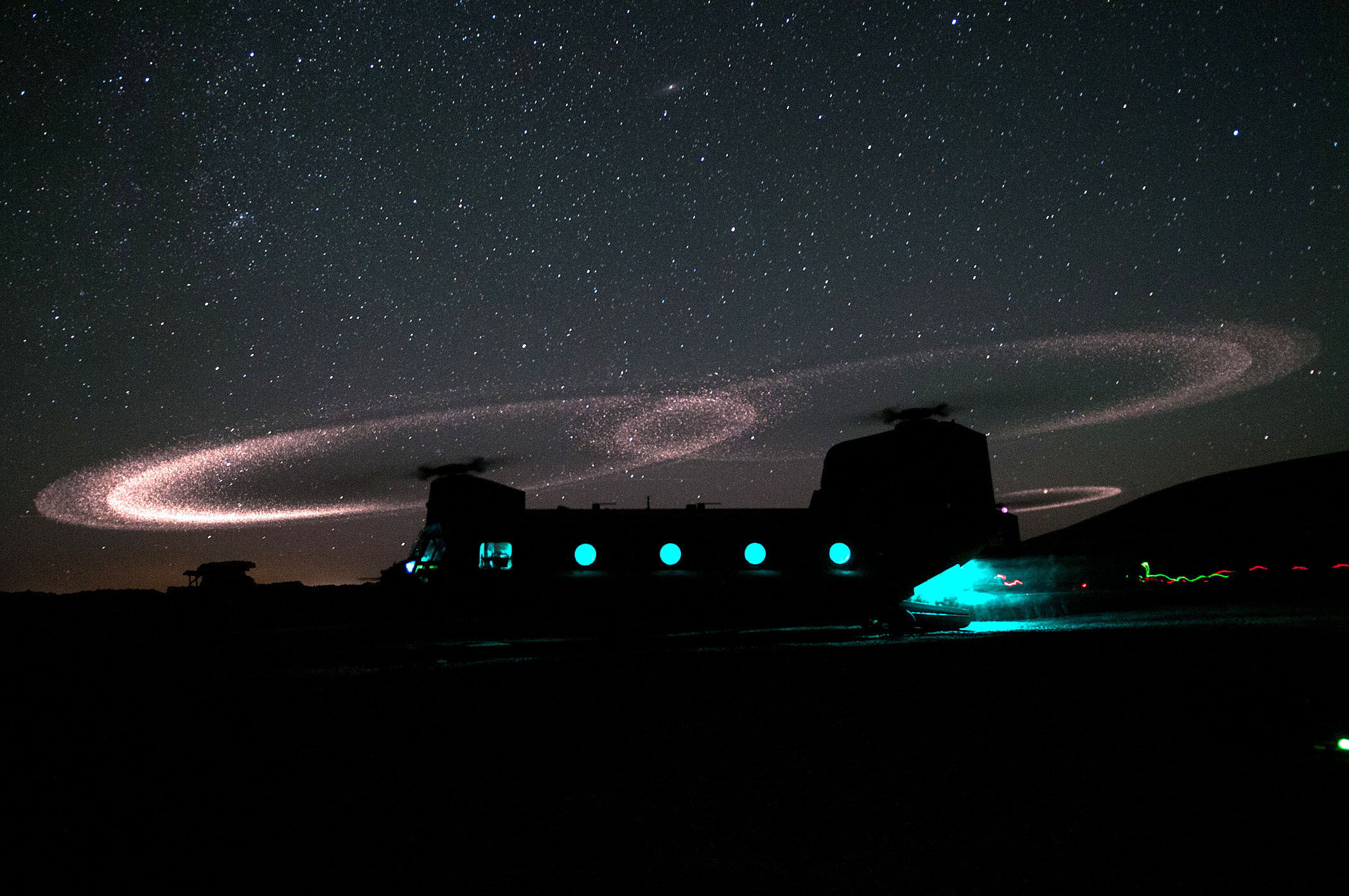
Kopp-Etchells effect

The effect is a consequence of sand hitting helicopter rotors in sandy environments. Abrasion strips on helicopter rotor blades are made of metal, often titanium or nickel, which are very hard, but less hard than sand. When a helicopter flies low to the ground in desert environments, sand striking the rotor blade can cause erosion. At night, sand hitting the metal abrasion strip causes a visible corona or halo around the rotor blades. The effect is caused by the pyrophoric oxidation of eroded particles and is known as the Kopp–Etchells effect.

Michael Yon observed the effect while accompanying U.S. soldiers in Afghanistan. When he discovered the effect had no name he coined the name "Kopp–Etchells effect" after two soldiers who had died in the war, one American and one British.

== See also ==
- Kandahar massacre
- Kent Gilbert
- J. Mark Ramseyer
