= Bridge bearing =

Resting surface between the piers and deck of a bridge

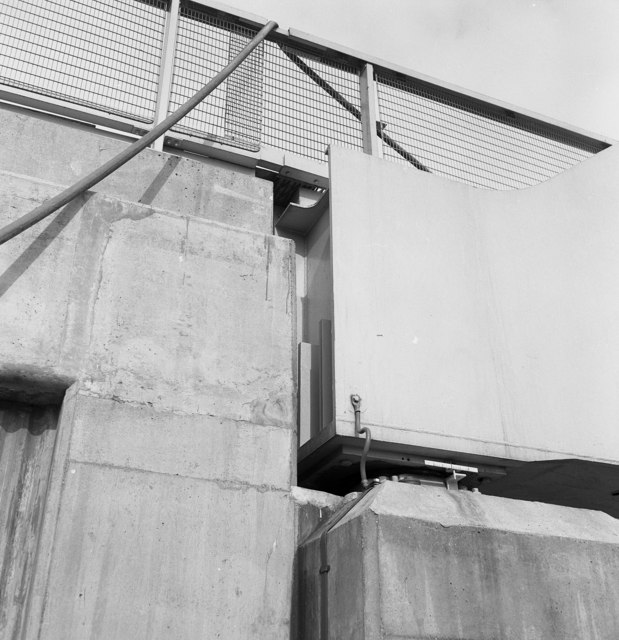
An expansion bearing on the Queen Elizabeth II Metro Bridge.

In structural engineering, a bridge bearing is a component of a bridge which typically provides a resting surface between bridge piers and the bridge deck. The purpose of a bearing is to allow controlled movement and thereby reduce the stresses involved. Possible causes of movement are thermal expansion and contraction, creep, shrinkage, or fatigue due to the properties of the material used for the bearing. External sources of movement include the settlement of the ground below, thermal expansion, and seismic activity. There are several different types of bridge bearings which are used depending on a number of different factors including the bridge span, loading conditions, and performance specifications. The oldest form of bridge bearing is simply two plates resting on top of each other. A common form of modern bridge bearing is the elastomeric bridge bearing. Another type of bridge bearing is the mechanical bridge bearing. There are several types of mechanical bridge bearing, such as the pinned bearing, which in turn includes specific types such as the rocker bearing, and the roller bearing. Another type of mechanical bearing is the fixed bearing, which allows rotation, but not other forms of movement.

== History ==
The first bridge bearings to be used were plane bearings in the early 1800s, which included sliding bearings or roller bearings. Plane bearings allowed horizontal movement in one direction, and could therefore transfer horizontal load. Rotating bearings were used in the late 1800s and early 1900s and included rocker bearings, knuckle bearings, and ball bearings. Rotating bearings allowed movement in both the horizontal and vertical directions. Both plane bearings and roller bearings were made of metal. In the mid-1900s, deformation bearings began to be used, which were made of rubber. Deformation bearings primarily include elastomeric bearings, the most common type of bridge bearing used today.

== Types of bridge bearings ==
=== Rocker bearings ===
Rocker bearings have curved surfaces that allow rocking. As the bridge expands, the bearing rocks to allow movement in the horizontal direction. Rocker bearings are primarily made of steel. Rocker bearings tend to be used for highway bridges.

=== Elastomeric bearings ===
Elastomeric bridge bearings are the most popular type of bridge bearing used today. They are made of rubber and do not have any moving parts, because the rubber itself allows movement in the bridge. Elastomeric bearings can be made at a low cost, and do not need to be maintained, like other forms of bearings that have moving parts and are made of metal. Elastomeric bearings can be reinforced with steel to make them stronger if needed.

=== Sliding bearings ===
Sliding bearings have both a flat sliding surface to allow horizontal movement and a spherical surface to allow rotation. Although they used to be made of metal, sliding bearings now tend to be made of Teflon.

=== Spherical bearings ===
As the name suggests, spherical bearings are in the shape of a sphere. These bearings only allow rotation, and prevent movement in the horizontal and vertical directions.

== Functions of bridge bearings ==
They are one of the most important components of bridges.

- They transfer forces from bridge superstructure to substructure. Mainly two types of loads: Vertical Loads such as the structure's weight and vehicle load, and Lateral Loads including earthquake and wind forces.
- They permit movements like translation and rotation in between girders and pier caps of bridges to accommodate movements such as thermal expansion.
- Neoprene bearing pads (rubber like structure), a special type of bridge bearing, loses its energy through deformation.
- It simplifies the load transfer mechanism and hence, making analysis easier.

== See also ==
- Expansion joint
- Pier (bridge structure)
