= Elastomeric bridge bearing =

Flexible connector between the components of a bridge

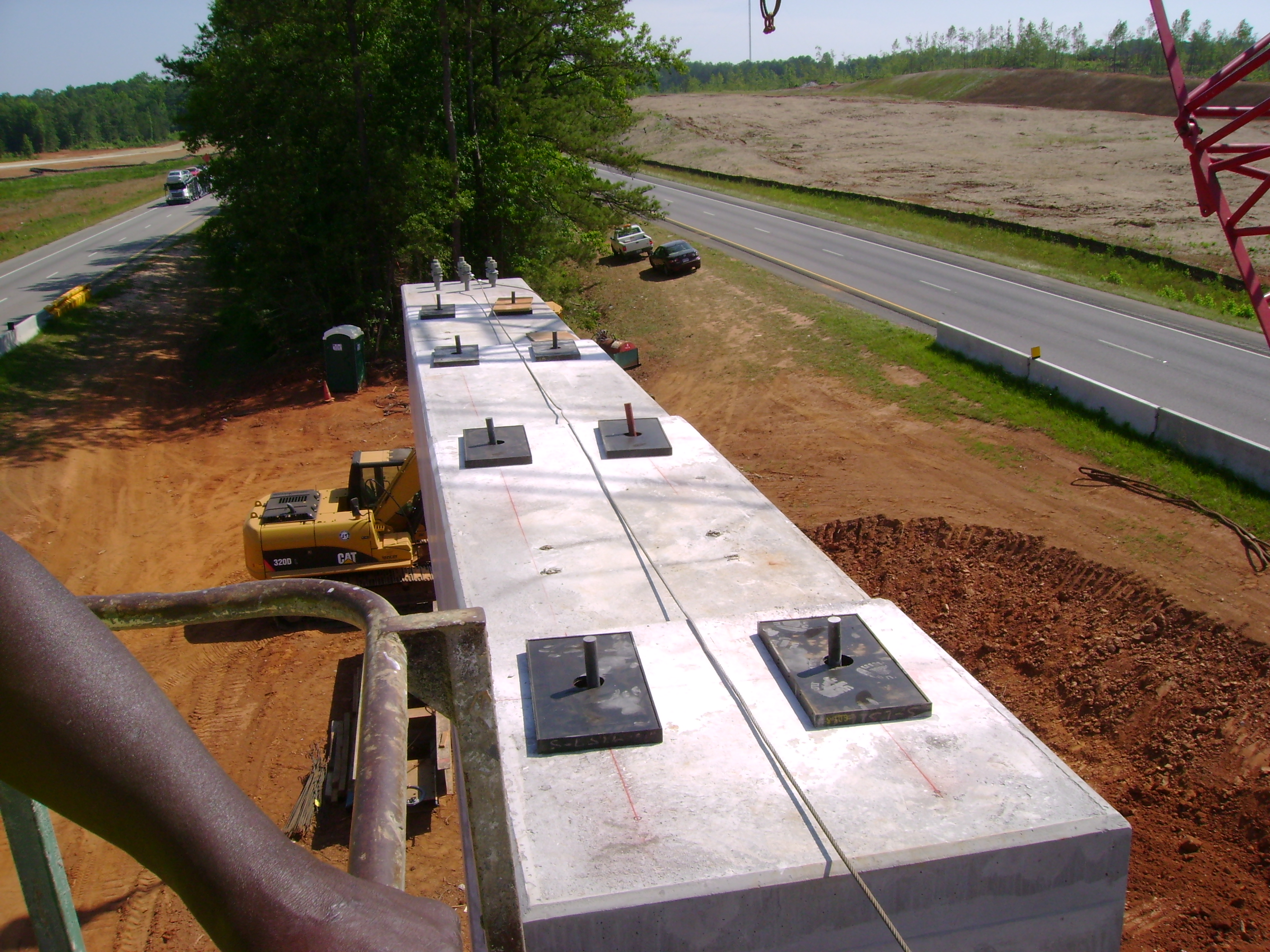
Elastomeric bearing pads, to serve as bridge beam support heads.

An elastomeric bridge bearing, also known as a pot bearing or elastomeric bearing, is a commonly used form of bridge bearing composed of elastomeric bridge bearing materials. The term encompasses several different types of bearings, including bearing pads, laminated elastomeric bearings, and seismic isolators.

The purpose of the elastomeric bearings is to support a bridge or other heavy structure in a way that permits the load to shift slightly, in a horizontal direction, relative to the ground or foundation. Without such bearings, the bridge support might fracture when it moves due to ground movements or thermal expansion and contraction. Elastomeric bearing pads compress on vertical loading, and accommodate both horizontal rotation and horizontal shear movement.

The internal structure of an elastomeric bearing consists of a three layers: a lower "pot" made of steel, which rests on the foundation or footing; a relatively thin elastomeric pad (a rectangle or disk shape) resting on the lower pot; and a steel plate loosely set on top of the elastomeric disk, on top of which the weight of the bridge rests. The bearings are often produced as a unit, ready to be installed.

The elastomeric pad may made from any of several materials, including natural rubber, elastomers, teflon, or synthetic rubber (such as neoprene).

Elastomeric bearing pads are the most economical solution used in construction of large span bridges and buildings.

Elastomeric bearings are often used in applications other than bridges, for example, supporting buildings that are built on soil that may shift slightly and cause a concrete load to crack in the absence of a elastomeric bearing.

Elastomeric bearings are designed and manufactured based on standards and specifications of such organizations as British Standard, AASHTO, and European Norms En 1337.
