= Cierva C.4 =

C.4
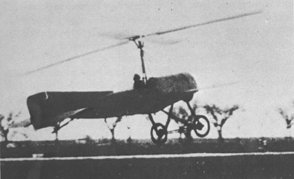

General information
- Type: Experimental autogyro
- National origin: Spain
- Manufacturer: Juan de la Cierva
- Designer: Juan de la Cierva
- Number built: 1

History
- First flight: January 1923

The Cierva C.4 was an experimental autogiro built by Juan de la Cierva in Spain in 1922 which early the following year became the first autogyro to fly successfully. Failures of De la Cierva's attempts to compensate for dissymmetry of lift with the C.1, C.2, and C.3 autogiros, led him to consider alternative means of enabling an autogyro to fly without rolling over. He noted that the problems experienced with his full-size aircraft were not present in the models that he had successfully flown, and considered the difference between the full-size and small-scale rotors. The rotors used on his model were made of bamboo and were thus far more flexible than the ones on his full-size aircraft. While attending an opera he realized that the flexibility eliminated the moments acting on the hub and associated instability. Trained as a civil engineer, Cierva was aware that a cantilever structure hinged to its attachment point generated no moment, and he designed a rotor the blades of which were mounted to the hub through hinges to permit their vertical oscillation.

The C.4 used a fuselage taken from a Sommer monoplane (possibly recycled from the C.3) fitted with a four-blade rotor. It was completed around April or May 1922, and was tested from June 1922 onwards by Jose Maria Espinosa Arias at Getafe. Success was not immediate and de la Cierva undertook a long series of modifications and refinements to the design. Finally, in January 1923, the aircraft flew at Getafe, under the control of Alejandro Gomez Spencer, making a flight of some 180 metres (600 ft). Sources differ as to whether this event took place on 9 January or 17 January.

On 20 January 1923, the engine failed in flight, and vindicated de la Cierva's original interest in autogyros – that of air safety – when the machine safely autorotated to the ground. Two days later, de la Cierva demonstrated the aircraft to military and aero club observers, including General Francisco Echagüe Santoyo, director of the army's air service, and Don Ricardo Ikuiz Ferry, president of the Royal Aero Club Commission. This led to a military demonstration at Cuatro Vientos on 31 January 1923, where the C.4 made a circular flight of 4 km (2 1/2 miles) in 3 1/2 minutes, at an altitude of over 25 m (80 ft).

In July 1923, De la Cierva built the C.5, an almost identical machine but for its three-blade main rotor.
