= Norman Surplus =

Northern Irish autogyro pilot (1963–2022)

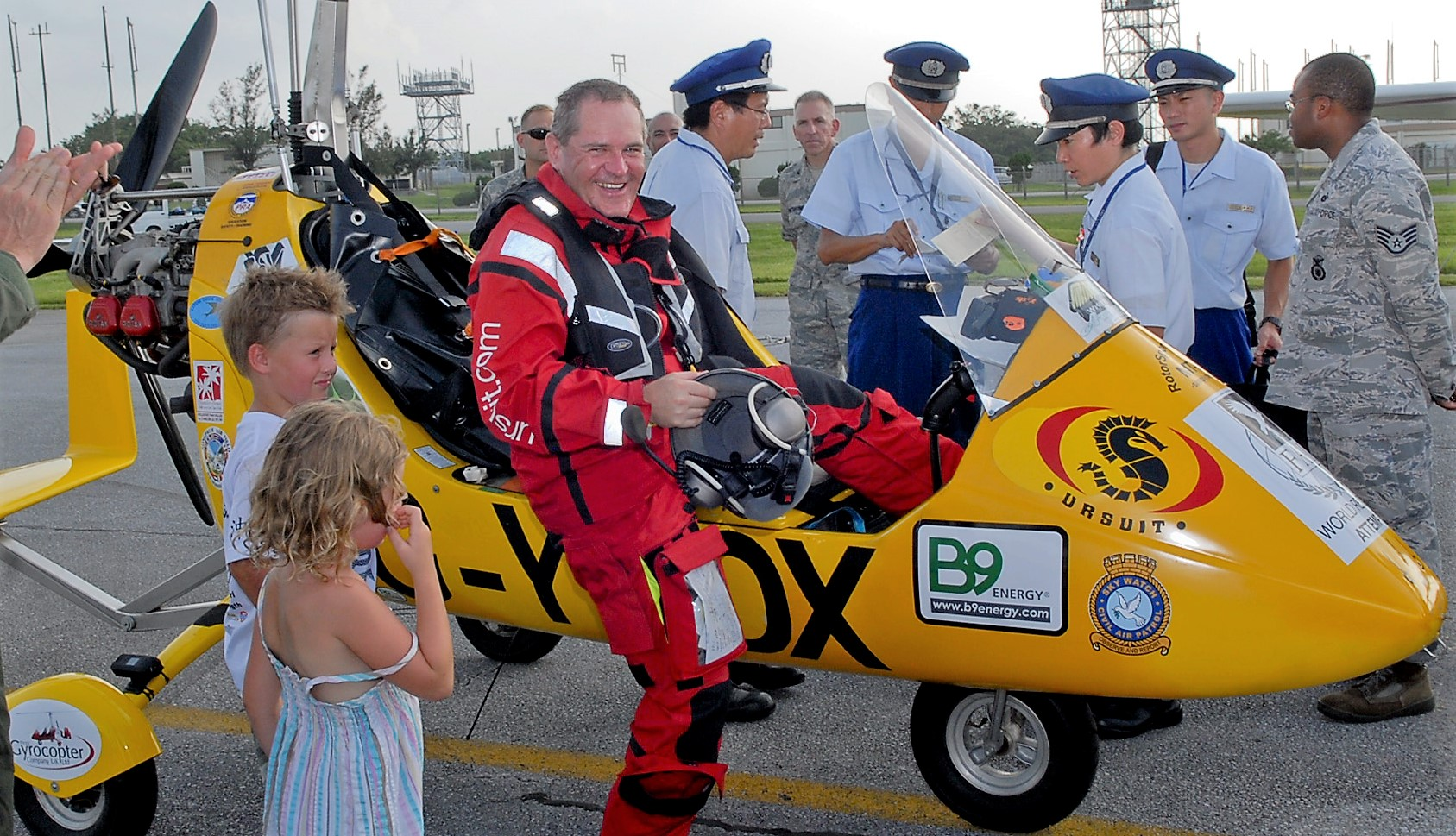
Surplus and his autogyro during his circumnavigation attempt at Kadena Air Base in 2011

Norman Surplus (7 February 1963 – 19 April 2022) was a pilot from Northern Ireland who circumnavigated the globe in an autogyro, nicknamed "Roxy". His trip began in 2010 and ended on 28 June 2019. In 2010, during the first leg of his trip, Surplus flew over Europe, the Middle East, Asia, and North America. In June 2015, Surplus commenced the second leg of his journey by flying through the United States and crossing the Atlantic Ocean to eventually land in Larne, Northern Ireland in August 2015, becoming the first person to cross the Atlantic in an autogyro. In 2019, he completed the last leg of his journey when he finally obtained permission from the Russian Federation to fly through its airspace. He left Larne on Easter Monday in 2019, and flew through Russia to eventually reach the United States and land at the Evergreen Aviation and Space Museum in Oregon completing his circumnavigation of the globe in an autogyro. Surplus's AutoGyro MT-03 is currently displayed at the EAA Aviation Museum initially to remain there for the duration of AirVenture 2020. Surplus took nine years to complete his journey around the world, and flew over 32 countries, over a total distance of 27,000 miles (43,000 km). In a 2015 interview with the CBC, while on a stopover at Iqaluit, Canada, Surplus mentioned that the trip should have taken approximately four months but the problems with obtaining permission to fly over Russia, which persisted for three years, derailed his plans.

== Personal life ==
In 2003, at 40 years of age, Surplus was diagnosed with bowel cancer and his probability of surviving for another 18 months was estimated at 40%. During his treatment period, he became interested in autogyros after watching a TV show about the rebuilding of an autogyro found in a barn. When he recovered he obtained his autogyro pilot's licence by attending a specialist school in the UK. Upon graduating, he flew by autogyro from Cumbria across the Irish Sea to Northern Ireland. After researching the topic of autogyro flying, Surplus discovered that there were no successful attempts at circumnavigating the globe in an autogyro, so he decided he would attempt it himself.

His other occupations included being a video game designer, wind-farmer and lifeboat captain. A book on his round-the-world trip was published 2022.

== Circumnavigation of the world ==
In a 2015 interview with the CBC, Surplus mentioned that the trip should have taken approximately four months but the problems with obtaining permission to fly over Russia, which persisted for three years, derailed his plans. The major phases of his journey are as follows:

=== 2010–2014 ===
In 2010, Surplus commenced his global trip in an autogyro departing from Larne, Northern Ireland and flying over Europe, the Middle East, and Asia, finally reaching Japan after flying for approximately a year. While flying in Thailand he had to crash land in a lake. During his 2010 trip, his overflights included France, Italy, Greece, Egypt, Saudi Arabia, Qatar, UAE, Oman, Pakistan, India, Bangladesh, Thailand, Malaysia, Philippines, and Japan. After landing in Japan, Surplus planned to fly through Russia on his way to the United States. His flight plan at the time included flying to Vladivostok, and then to Chukotka in the Russian Far East, followed by an entry to Alaska on the way to the contiguous United States. Although he had obtained permission from Russia to fly over its territory, due to subsequent delays, the permit expired and he had to reapply. In the interim, the international political climate involving Russia had worsened, and that led to bureaucratic delays from the Russians, who now withheld flight permission from Surplus. This led to Surplus's autogyro remaining in Japan for the following three years. Surplus considered various other circumnavigation routes, but, in 2014, he finally decided to ship the autogyro to Tacoma, Washington from where it went to the Evergreen Air and Space Museum in McMinnville, Oregon, to be stored for the winter. In 2013, Surplus appealed directly to Russian president Vladimir Putin, during Putin's visit to Northern Ireland, asking to be given permission to fly through Russia. The trip was also delayed further due to strong winds and inclement weather.

=== 2015 ===
On 1 June 2015, Surplus resumed his flight around the world starting from Oregon, flying through Wyoming and other US states, Canada, and across the North Atlantic, by way of Greenland and the Faroe Islands. From there, he reached the UK and made a brief stop at Stornoway on the Isle of Lewis on 11 August 2015, after which he flew to Gigha and then to Sandy Bay, near Larne, his hometown, landing there on the same day. In the 2015 leg of the trip, Surplus flew a distance of 7,500 miles (12,100 km). At the time, Surplus set 19 FAI world records, ", and becoming the first person to cross the Atlantic in an autogyro. The latter record is known as the "Blue Riband record", and was awarded to Surplus for crossing the Atlantic from the North American exit point of Belfast, Maine with final destination Larne, Northern Ireland.

=== 2019 ===
In 2019, Surplus finally obtained permission to fly through Russian airspace. He launched the final stage of his world trip, by leaving from Sandy Bay, on Easter Monday in 2019, flying through Britain, the Netherlands, Germany, Poland, Lithuania, and Estonia, before eventually entering Russian airspace. He flew 5,000 miles (8,000 km) through Russia, and on 28 June 2019 he landed at the Evergreen Aviation and Space Museum in Oregon, United States, completing the first physical circumnavigation flight of the world in an autogyro. However, dogged by the lengthy diplomatic delays, it had eventually taken 4 years and 28 days to complete the entire circumnavigation, so the flight was no longer deemed eligible for setting a first Official FAI "speed record" around the world.

During the Russian flyover, Surplus rendezvoused with UK adventurer James Ketchell and both Ketchell and Surplus then flew their respective autogyros, G-KTCH and G-YROX, in loose formation together during their pioneering Trans - Russia, Bering Straits and Alaskan crossings.

Three months after Surplus had successfully completed his circumnavigation in Oregon, Ketchell subsequently completed his own circumnavigation on his return to the UK and established the first "Speed around the World, Eastbound" FAI Record, for the circumnavigation of the world in a category E-3A Autogyro (175 days) in September 2019. He was also subsequently awarded a Guinness World Record for the first circumnavigation of the world in an autogyro.

== Death ==
Surplus died at home, on 19 April 2022 of a heart attack, whilst battling with his third bout of cancer. He was aged 59.

== See also ==
- Expedition Global Eagle
