= P-factor =

Yawing force caused by a rotating propeller

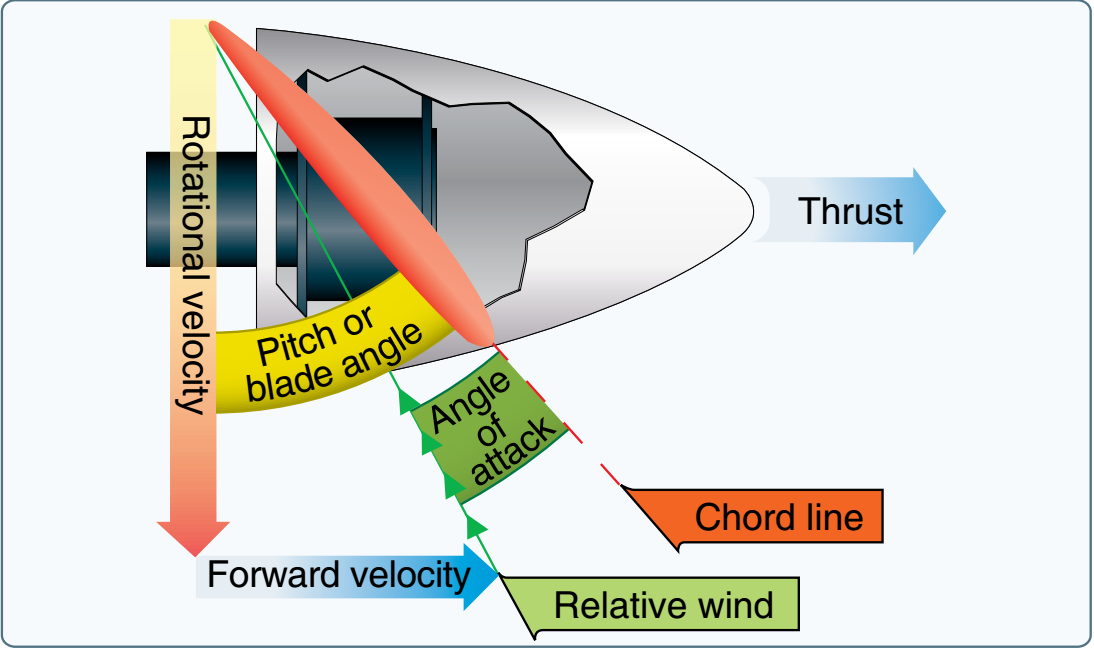
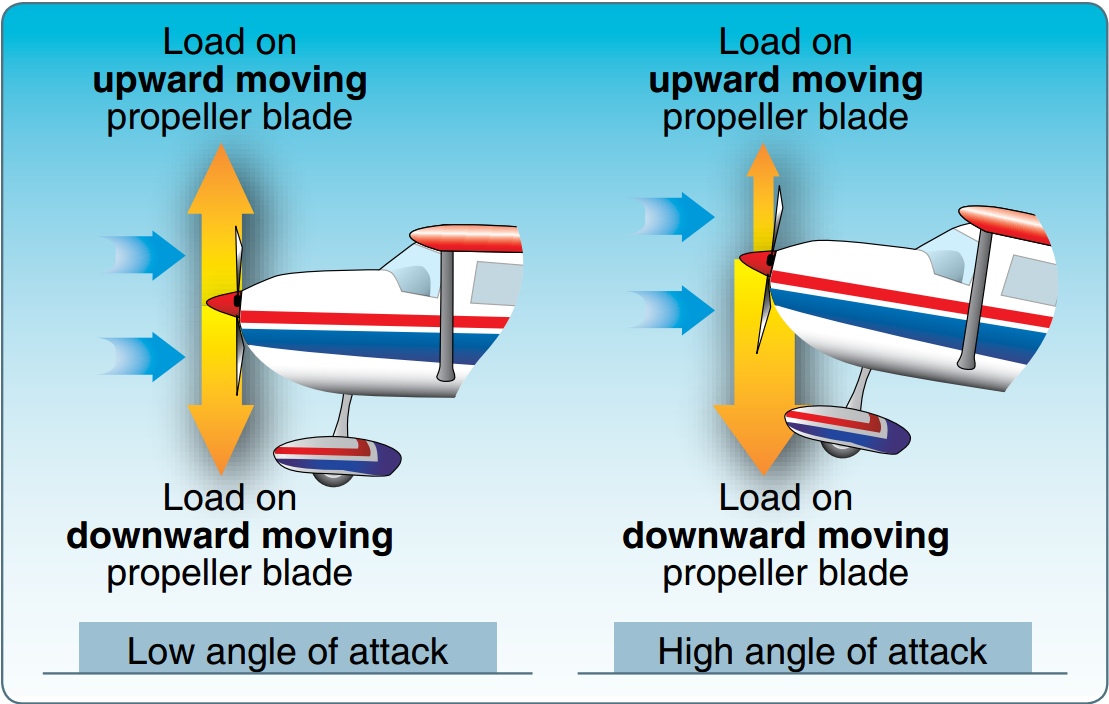
Propeller blade angle of attack (left) and propeller blade angle of attack change with aircraft pitch change, demonstrating asymmetrical load (right)

P‑factor, also known as asymmetric blade effect and asymmetric disc effect, is an aerodynamic phenomenon experienced by a moving propeller, wherein the propeller's center of thrust moves off-center when the aircraft is at a high angle of attack. This shift in the location of the center of thrust will exert a yawing moment on the aircraft, causing it to yaw slightly to one side. A rudder input is required to counteract the yawing tendency.

== Causes ==
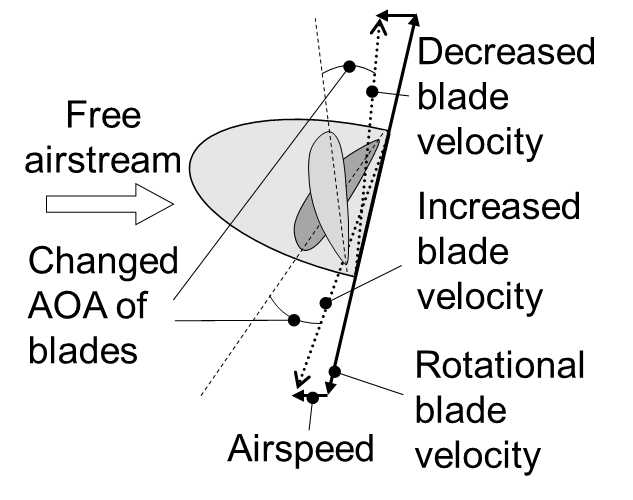
P-factor, change of relative speed and thrust of up- and down-going propeller blades at increasing angle of attack

When a propeller aircraft is flying at cruise speed in level flight, the propeller disc is perpendicular to the relative airflow through the propeller. Each of the propeller blades contacts the air at the same angle and speed, and thus the thrust produced is evenly distributed across the propeller.

However, at lower speeds, the aircraft will typically be in a nose-high attitude, with the propeller disc rotated slightly toward the horizontal. This has two effects. Firstly, propeller blades will be more forward when in the down position, and more backwards when in the up position. The propeller blade moving down and forward (for clockwise rotation, from the one o'clock to the six o'clock position when viewed from the cockpit) will have a greater forward speed. This will increase the airspeed of the blade, so the down-going blade will produce more thrust. The propeller blade moving up and back (from the seven o'clock to the 12 o'clock position) will have a decreased forward speed, therefore a lower airspeed than the down-going blade and lower thrust. This asymmetry displaces the center of thrust of the propeller disc towards the blade with increased thrust.

Secondly, the angle of attack of the down-going blade will increase, and the angle of attack of the up-going blade will decrease, because of the tilt of the propeller disc. The greater angle of attack of the down-going blade will produce more thrust.

Note that the increased forward speed of the down-going blade actually reduces its angle of attack, but this is overcome by the increase in angle of attack caused by the tilt of the propeller disc. Overall, the down-going blade has a greater airspeed and a greater angle of attack.

P-factor is greatest at high angles of attack and high power, for example during take-off or in slow flight.

== Effects ==
=== Single engine propeller aircraft ===
If using a clockwise turning propeller (as viewed by the pilot) the aircraft has a tendency to yaw to the left when climbing and right when descending. This must be countered with opposite rudder. The clockwise-turning propeller is by far the most common. The yaw is noticeable when adding power, though it has additional causes including the spiral slipstream effect. In a fixed-wing aircraft, there is usually no way to adjust the angle of attack of the individual blades of the propellers, therefore the pilot must contend with P-factor and use the rudder to counteract the shift of thrust.

Pilots anticipate the need for rudder when changing engine power or pitch angle (angle of attack), and compensate by applying left or right rudder as required.

Tail-wheel aircraft exhibit more P-factor during the ground-roll than aircraft with tricycle landing gear, because of the greater angle of the propeller disc to the vertical. P-factor is insignificant during the initial ground roll, but will give a pronounced nose-left tendency during the later stages of the ground roll as forward speed increases, particularly if the thrust axis is kept inclined to the flight path vector (e.g. tail-wheel in contact with runway). The effect is not so apparent during the landing, flare and rollout, given the relatively low power setting (propeller RPM). However, should the throttle be suddenly advanced with the tail-wheel in contact with the runway, then anticipation of this nose-left tendency is prudent.

=== Multi engine propeller aircraft ===
For multi-engine aircraft with counter-rotating propellers, the P-factors of both engines will cancel out. However, if both engines rotate in the same direction, or if one engine fails, P-factor will cause a yaw. As with single-engine aircraft, this effect is greatest in situations where the aircraft is at high power and has a high angle of attack (such as the climb). The engine with the down-moving blades towards the wingtip produces more yaw and roll than the other engine, because the moment (arm) of that engine's center of thrust about the aircraft center of gravity is greater. Thus, the engine with down-moving blades closer to the fuselage will be the "critical engine", because its failure and the associated reliance on the other engine will require a significantly larger rudder deflection by the pilot to maintain straight flight than if the other engine had failed. P-Factor therefore determines which engine is critical engine. For most aircraft (which have clockwise rotating propellers), the left engine is the critical engine. For aircraft with counter-rotating propellers (i.e. not rotating in the same direction) the P-factor moments are equal and both engines are considered equally critical.

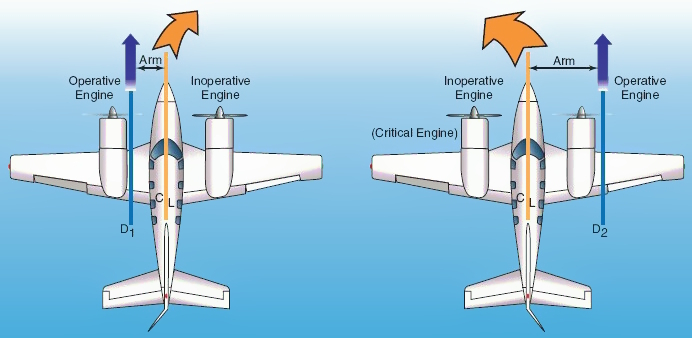
Fig. 1. The operating right-hand engine will produce a more severe yawing moment towards the dead engine, thus making the failure of the left-hand engine critical

With engines rotating in the same direction, P-factor will affect the minimum control speeds (V_{MC}) of the aircraft in asymmetric powered flight. The published speeds are determined based on the failure of the critical engine. The actual minimum control speeds after failure of any other engine will be lower (safer).

== Helicopters ==
P-factor is extremely significant for helicopters in forward flight, because the propeller disc is almost horizontal. The forward-going blade has a higher airspeed than the backward-going blade, so it produces more lift, known as dissymmetry of lift. Helicopters can control each blade's angle of attack independently (decreasing the angle of attack on the advancing blade, while increasing the angle of attack on the retreating blade) in order to keep the lift of the rotor disc balanced. If the blades of the rotor were unable to independently change their angle of attack, a helicopter with counterclockwise-rotating rotor blades would roll to the left when in forward flight, due to the increased lift on the side of the rotor disc with the advancing blade. Gyroscopic precession converts this into a backwards pitch known as "flap back".

The never-exceed speed (V_{NE}) of a helicopter will be chosen in part to ensure that the backwards-moving blade does not stall.

== See also ==
- Blohm & Voss BV 141
- Propeller walk
- Dissymmetry of lift (in helicopters)
