= Autogyro =

Rotorcraft with unpowered rotor

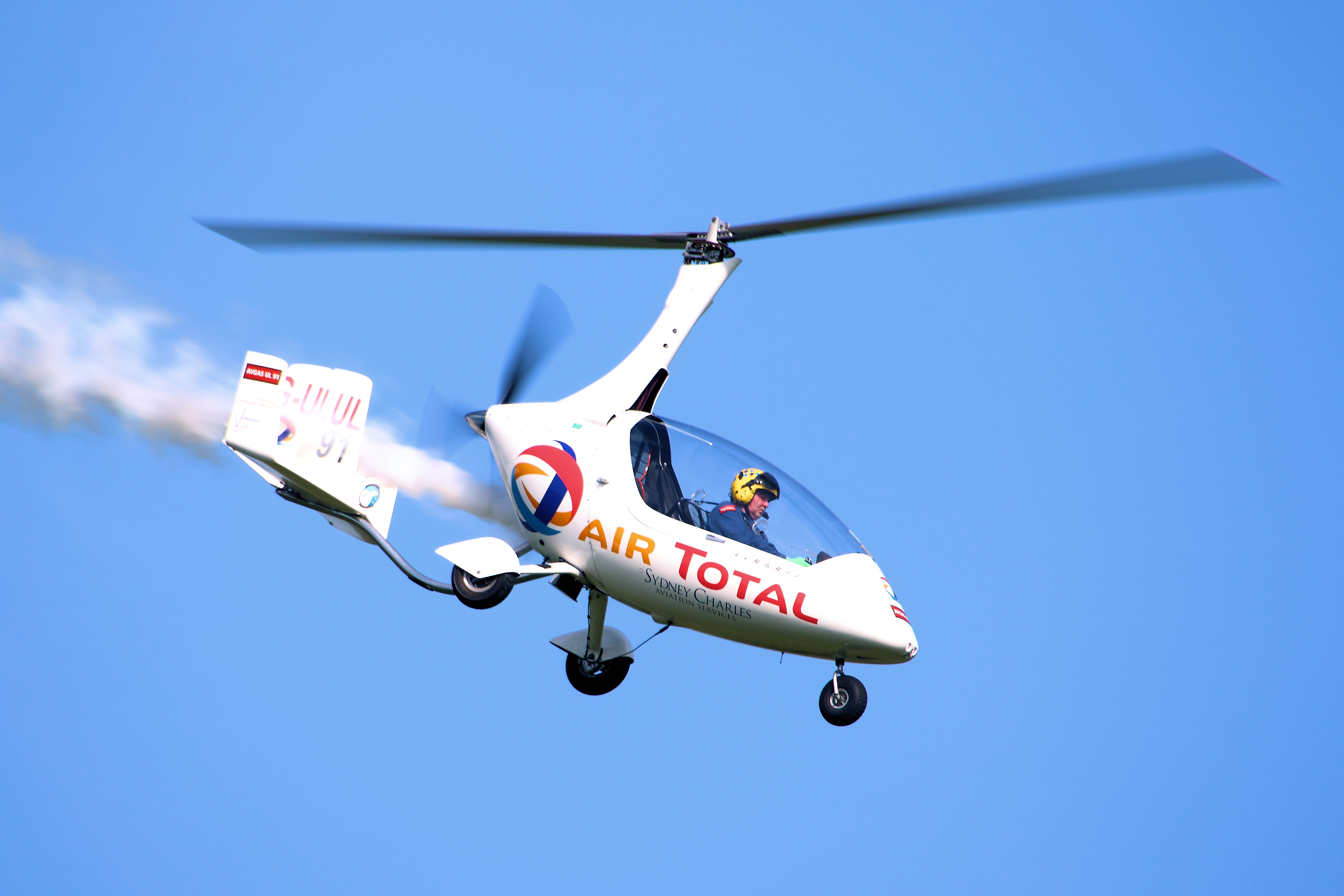
The AutoGyro Calidus, a modern, closed-cabin, pusher-propeller autogyro in flight

An autogyro (from Greek αὐτός and γύρος, "self-turning"), gyroplane or gyrocopter, is a class of rotorcraft that uses an unpowered rotor in free autorotation to develop lift. A gyroplane is "a rotorcraft whose rotors are not engine-driven, except for initial starting, but are made to rotate by action of the air when the rotorcraft is moving; and whose means of propulsion, consisting usually of conventional propellers, is independent of the rotor system." While similar to a helicopter rotor in appearance, the autogyro's unpowered rotor disc must have air flowing upward across it to make it rotate. Forward thrust is provided independently, by an engine-driven propeller.

It was originally named the autogiro by its Spanish inventor and engineer, Juan de la Cierva, in his attempt to create an aircraft that could fly safely at low speeds. He first flew one in January 1923, at Cuatro Vientos Airport in Madrid. The aircraft resembled the fixed-wing aircraft of the day, with a front-mounted engine and propeller. The term Autogiro became trademarked by the Cierva Autogiro Company. De la Cierva's Autogiro is considered the predecessor of the modern helicopter. The term "gyrocopter" (derived from helicopter) was used by E. Burke Wilford, who developed the Reiseler-Kreiser feathering-rotor-equipped gyroplane in the first half of the twentieth century. Gyroplane was later adopted as a trademark by Bensen Aircraft.

The success of the Autogiro garnered the interest of industrialists and under license from de la Cierva in the 1920s and 1930s, the Pitcairn & Kellett companies made further innovations. Late-model autogyros patterned after Etienne Dormoy's Buhl A-1 Autogyro and Igor Bensen's designs feature a rear-mounted engine and propeller in a pusher configuration.

== Principle of operation ==
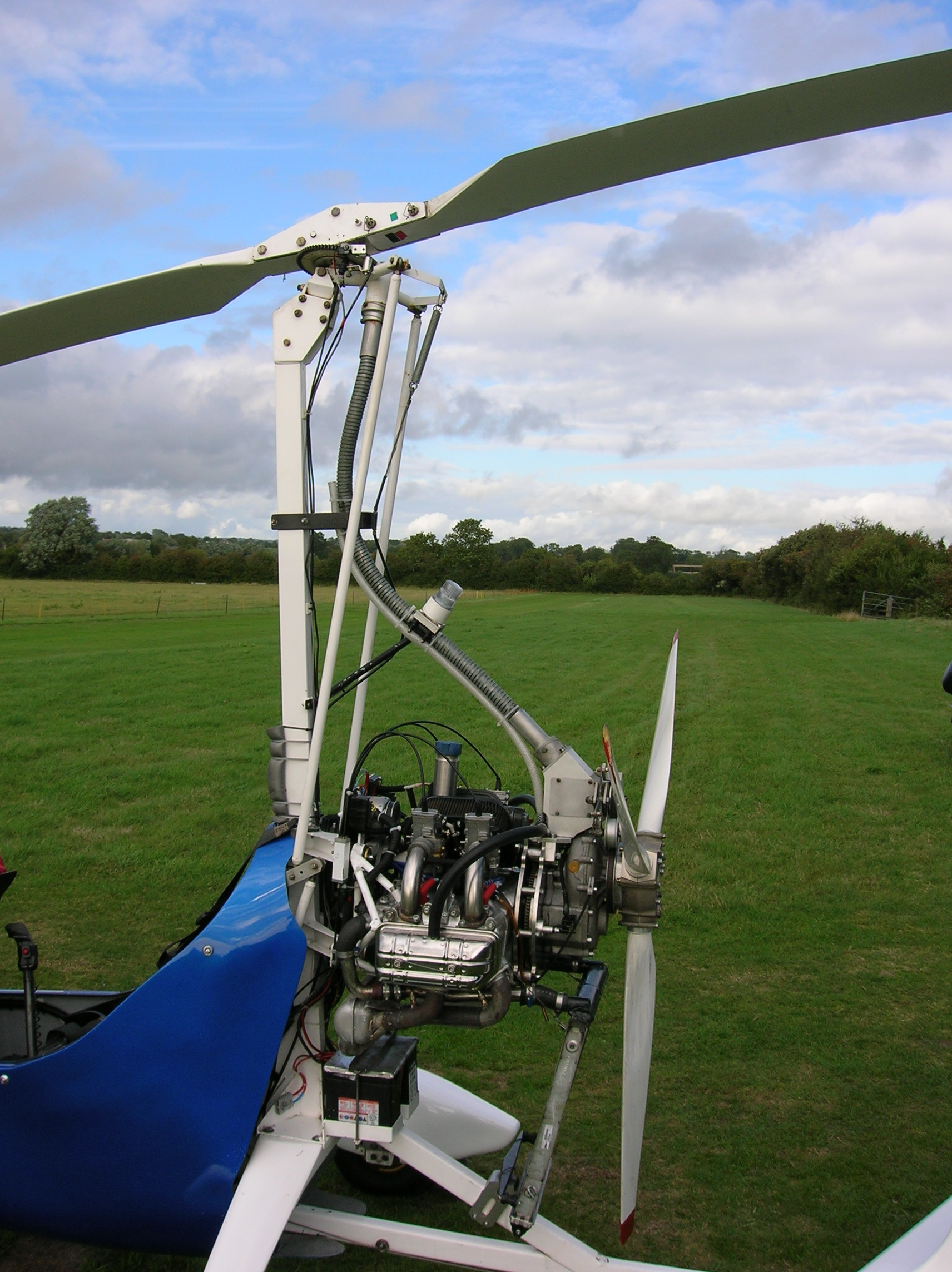
The rotor head, pre-rotator shaft, and Subaru engine configuration on a VPM M-16 autogyro

An autogyro is characterized by a free-spinning rotor that turns because of the passage of air through the rotor from below. The downward component of the total aerodynamic reaction of the rotor gives lift to the vehicle, sustaining it in the air. A separate propeller provides forward thrust and can be placed in a puller configuration, with the engine and propeller at the front of the fuselage, or in a pusher configuration, with the engine and propeller at the rear of the fuselage.

Whereas a helicopter works by forcing the rotor blades through the air, drawing air from above, the autogyro rotor blade generates lift in the same way as a glider's wing, by changing the angle of the air as the air moves upward and backward relative to the rotor blade. The free-spinning blades turn by autorotation; the rotor blades are angled so that they not only give lift, but the angle of the blades causes the lift to accelerate the blades' rotation rate until the rotor turns at a stable speed with the drag force and the thrust force in balance.

External videos
- Takeoffs and Landings on YouTube of Groen Hawk 4
- Jump takeoff on YouTube of Pitcairn PA-36 in 1941

Because the craft must be moving forward with respect to the surrounding air to force air through the overhead rotor, autogyros are generally not capable of vertical takeoff (except in a strong headwind). A few types such as the Air & Space 18A have shown short takeoff or landing.

Pitch control is achieved by tilting the rotor forward and aft, and roll control is by tilting the rotor laterally. The tilt of the rotor can be effected by utilizing a tilting hub (Cierva), a swashplate (Air & Space 18A), or servo-flaps. A rudder provides yaw control. On pusher configuration autogyros, the rudder is typically placed in the propeller slipstream to maximize yaw control at low airspeed (but not always, as seen in the McCulloch J-2, with twin rudders placed outboard of the propeller arc).

== Flight controls ==
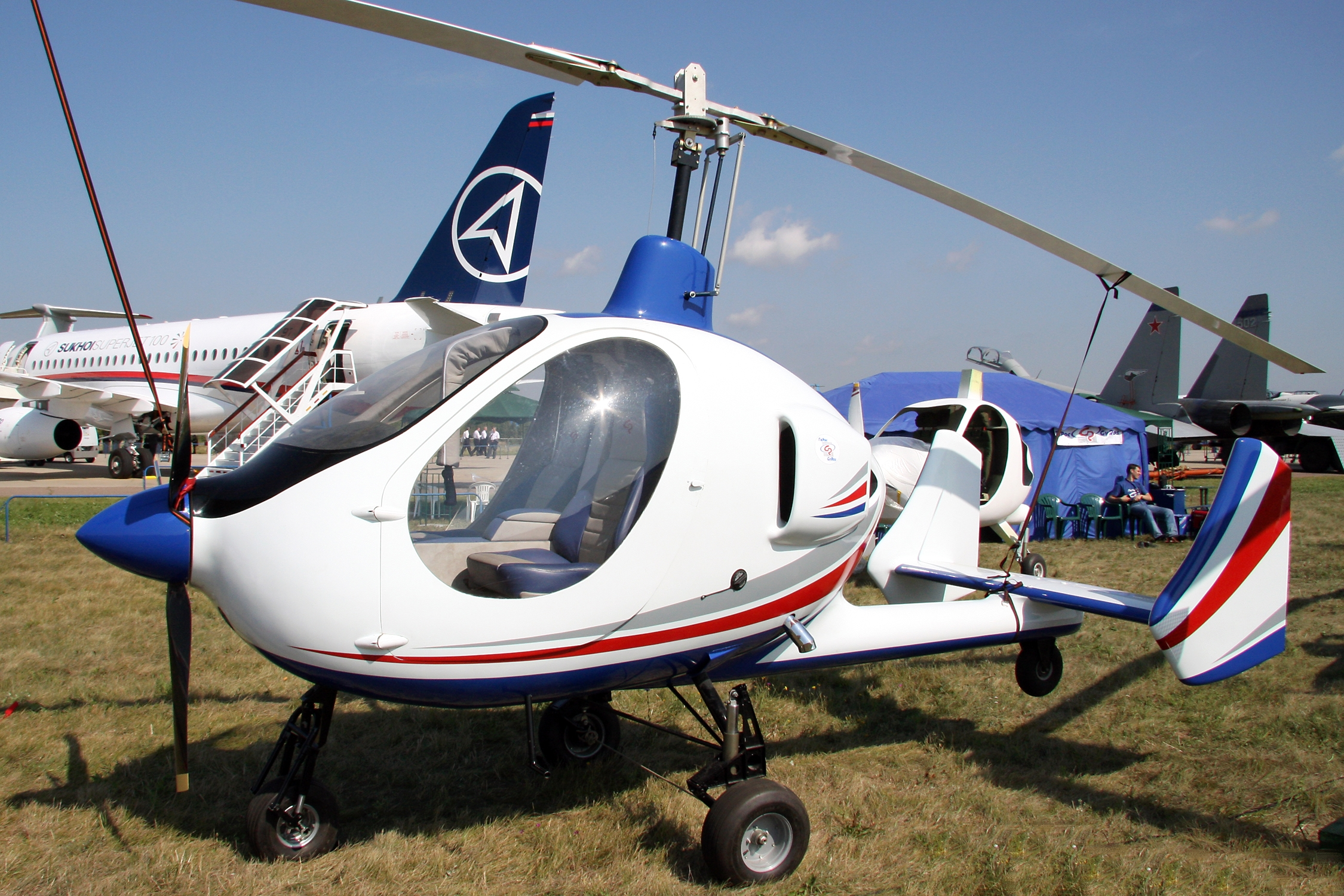
Russian Gyroplanes Gyros-2 Smartflier

There are three primary flight controls: control stick, rudder pedals, and throttle. Typically, the control stick is termed the cyclic and tilts the rotor in the desired direction to provide pitch and roll control (some autogyros do not tilt the rotor relative to the airframe, or only do so in one dimension, and have conventional control surfaces to vary the remaining degrees of freedom). The rudder pedals provide yaw control, and the throttle controls engine power.

Secondary flight controls include the rotor transmission clutch, also known as a pre-rotator, which when engaged drives the rotor to start it spinning before takeoff, and collective pitch to reduce blade pitch before driving the rotor. Collective pitch controls are not usually fitted to autogyros but can be found on the Air & Space 18A, McCulloch J-2 and the Westermayer Tragschrauber, and can provide near VTOL performance.

== Pusher vs tractor configuration ==
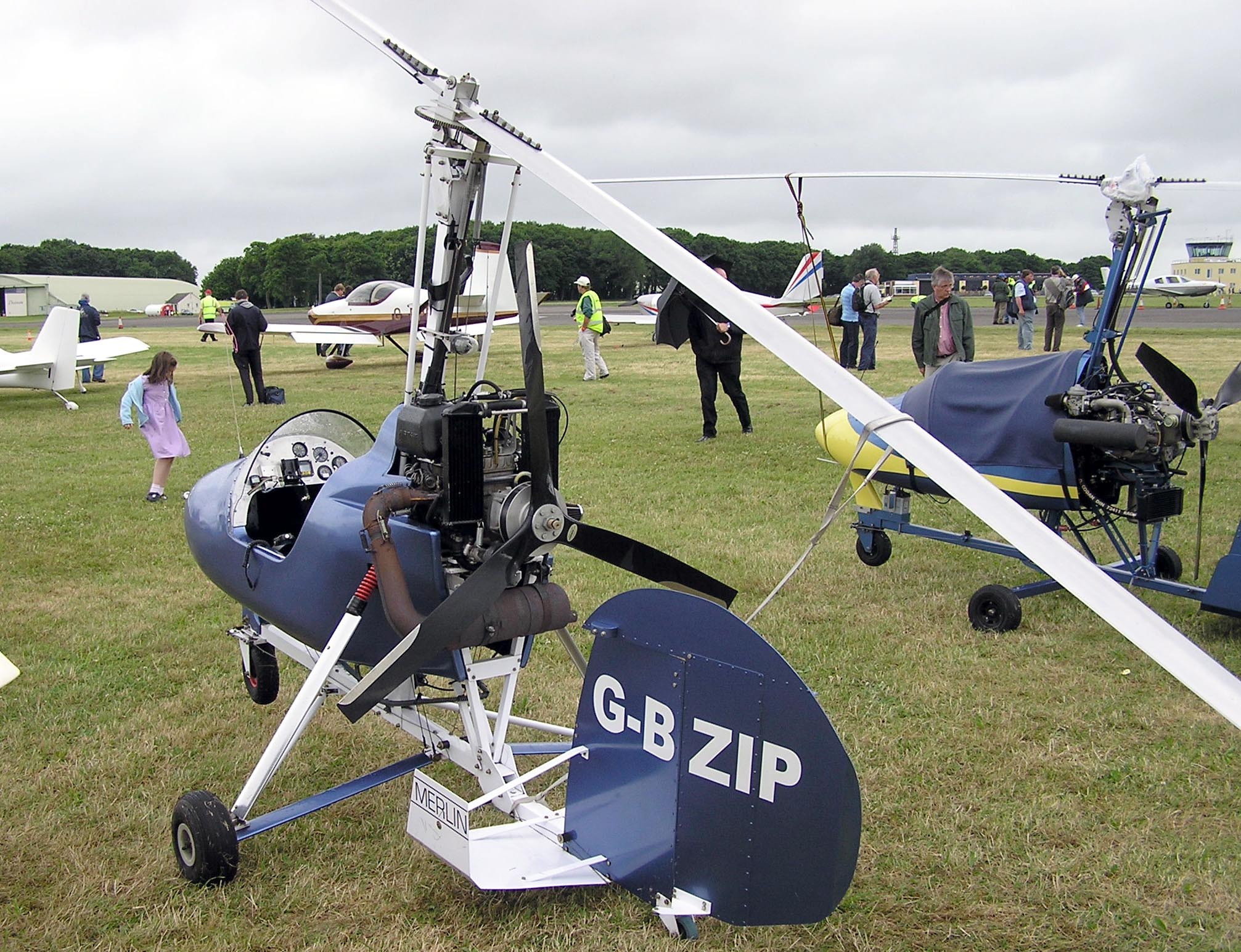
Montgomerie Merlin single-seat autogyro

Modern autogyros typically follow one of two basic configurations. The most common design is the pusher configuration, where the engine and propeller are located behind the pilot and rotor mast, such as in the Bensen "Gyrocopter". Its main advantages are the simplicity and lightness of its construction and the unobstructed visibility. It was developed by Igor Bensen in the decades following World War II, who also founded the Popular Rotorcraft Association (PRA) to help it become more widespread.

Less common today is the tractor configuration. In this version, the engine and propeller are located at the front of the aircraft, ahead of the pilot and rotor mast. This was the primary configuration in early autogyros but became less common. Nonetheless, the tractor configuration has some advantages compared to a pusher, namely greater yaw stability (as the center of mass is farther away from the rudder), and greater ease in aligning the center of thrust with the center of mass to prevent "bunting" (engine thrust overwhelming the pitch control).

== History ==
Juan de la Cierva was a Spanish engineer, pilot, and aeronautical enthusiast. In 1921, he participated in a design competition to develop a bomber for the Spanish military. Cierva designed a three-engined aircraft, but during an early test flight, the bomber stalled and crashed. Cierva was troubled by the stall phenomenon and vowed to develop an aircraft that could fly safely at low airspeeds. The result was the first successful rotorcraft, which he named autogiro in 1923. Cierva's autogiro used an airplane fuselage with a forward-mounted propeller and engine, an un-powered rotor mounted on a mast, and a horizontal and vertical stabilizer. His aircraft became the predecessor of the modern helicopter.

=== Early development ===
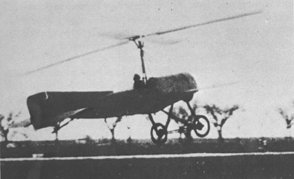
The first successful autogyro, the C.4, first flown in 1923

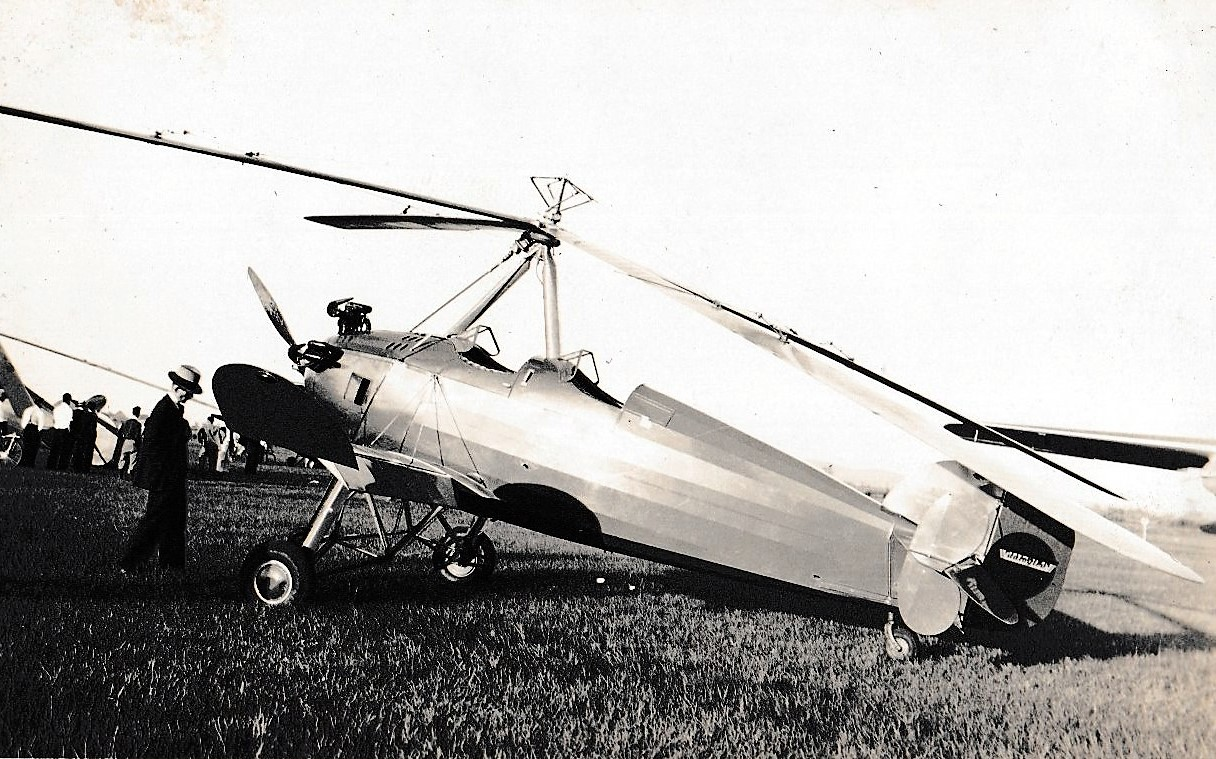
A Pitcairn autogyro NC-12681 at St. Hubert, Quebec. 19 August 1932

It took four years of experimentation for Cierva to invent the first practical rotorcraft, the autogyro (autogiro in Spanish), in 1923. His first three designs (C.1, C.2, and C.3) were unstable because of aerodynamic and structural deficiencies in their rotors. His fourth design, the C.4, made the first documented flight of an autogyro on 17 January 1923, piloted by Alejandro Gomez Spencer at Cuatro Vientos airfield near Madrid, Spain (9 January according to de la Cierva).

The first tests of the C.4 model, built in 1922 according to principles that Cierva had worked out for rotor flight, were unsuccessful. To find a solution, Cierva conducted a complete series of tests in the closed-circuit wind tunnel at Cuatro Vientos Aerodrome (designed by Emilio Herrera), at that time the best in Europe. The new, modified aircraft was successfully tested on January 9, 1923, at Getafe Aerodrome, piloted by Lieutenant Alejandro Gómez Spencer. Although this flight consisted only of a 183 m jump, it demonstrated the validity of the concept. At the end of the month, the C.4 completed a 4 km closed circuit at Cuatro Vientos Aerodrome in four minutes, at an altitude of about 30 m. The C.4's powerplant was a 110 hp Le Rhône 9Ja engine. In July 1923, the same engine was used in the C.5, which flew at Getafe. From that moment on, La Cierva, who had financed his previous experiments at his own expense, relied on a grant from the Spanish government for his work.

Cierva had fitted the rotor of the C.4 with flapping hinges to attach each rotor blade to the hub. The flapping hinges allowed each rotor blade to flap, or move up and down, to compensate for dissymmetry of lift, the difference in lift produced between the right and left sides of the rotor as the autogyro moves forward. Three days later, the engine failed shortly after takeoff and the aircraft descended steeply but slowly to a safe landing, validating de la Cierva's efforts to produce an aircraft that could be flown safely at low airspeeds.

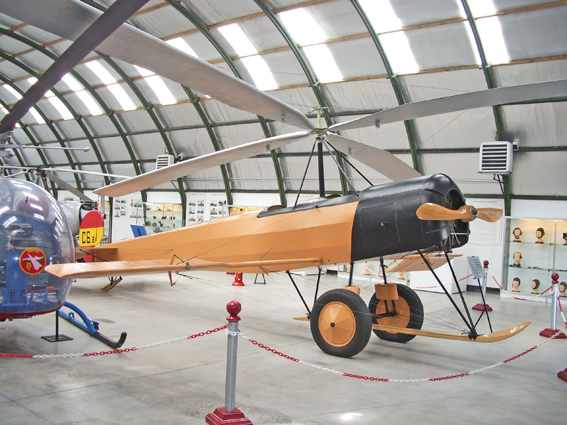
A Cierva C.6 replica in Cuatro Vientos Air Museum, Madrid, Spain

Cierva developed his C.6 model with the assistance of Spain's Military Aviation establishment, having expended all his funds on the development and construction of the first five prototypes. The C.6 first flew in February 1925, piloted by Captain Joaquín Loriga, including a flight of 10.5 kilometres (6.5 miles) from Cuatro Vientos airfield to Getafe airfield in about eight minutes, a significant accomplishment for any rotorcraft of the time. Shortly after Cierva's success with the C.6, he accepted an offer from Scottish industrialist James G. Weir to establish the Cierva Autogiro Company in the UK, following a demonstration of the C.6 before the British Air Ministry at RAE Farnborough, on 20 October 1925. Britain had become the world centre of autogyro development.

A crash in February 1926, caused by blade root failure, led to an improvement in rotor hub design. A drag hinge was added in conjunction with the flapping hinge to allow each blade to move forward and aft and relieve in-plane stresses, generated as a byproduct of the flapping motion. This development led to the Cierva C.8, which, on 18 September 1928, made the first rotorcraft crossing of the English Channel followed by a tour of Europe.

United States industrialist Harold Frederick Pitcairn, on learning of the successful flights of the autogyro, visited de la Cierva in Spain. In 1928, he visited him again, in England, after taking a C.8 L.IV test flight piloted by Arthur H. C. A. Rawson. Being particularly impressed with the autogyro's safe vertical descent capability, Pitcairn purchased a C.8 L.IV with a Wright Whirlwind engine. Arriving in the United States on 11 December 1928 accompanied by Rawson, this autogyro was redesignated C.8W. Subsequently, production of autogyros was licensed to several manufacturers, including the Pitcairn Autogiro Company in the United States and Focke-Wulf of Germany.

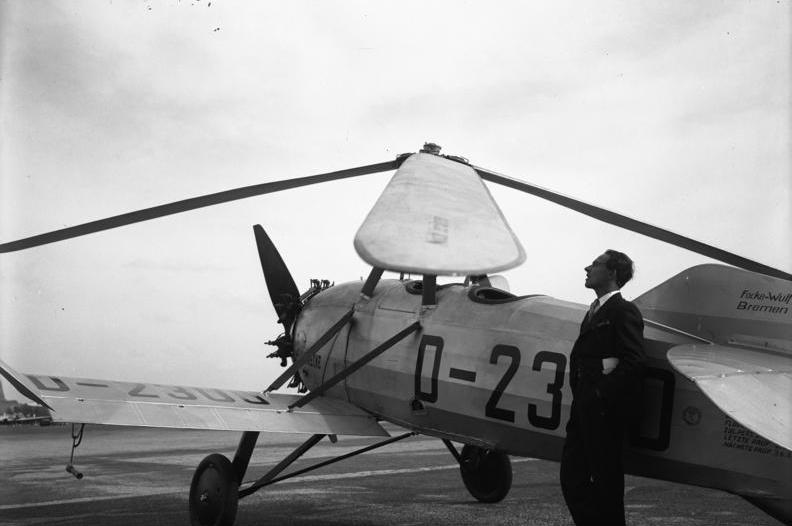
A Focke-Wulf-built Cierva C.19 Mk.IV Autogiro

In 1927, German engineer Engelbert Zaschka invented a combined helicopter and autogyro. The principal advantage of the Zaschka machine is its ability to remain motionless in the air for any length of time and to descend in a vertical line so that a landing could be accomplished on the flat roof of a large house. In appearance, the machine does not differ much from the ordinary monoplane, but the carrying wings revolve around the body.

Development of the autogyro continued in the search for a means to accelerate the rotor before takeoff (called prerotating). Rotor drives initially took the form of a rope wrapped around the rotor axle and then pulled by a team of men to accelerate the rotor – this was followed by a long taxi to bring the rotor up to speed sufficient for takeoff. The next innovation was flaps on the tail to redirect the propeller slipstream into the rotor while on the ground. This design was first tested on a C.19 in 1929. Efforts in 1930 had shown that the development of a light and efficient mechanical transmission was not a trivial undertaking. In 1932 the Pitcairn-Cierva Autogiro Company of Willow Grove, Pennsylvania, United States solved this problem with a transmission driven by the engine.

Buhl Aircraft Company produced its Buhl A-1, the first autogyro with a propulsive rear motor, designed by Etienne Dormoy and meant for aerial observation (motor behind pilot and camera). It had its maiden flight on 15 December 1931.

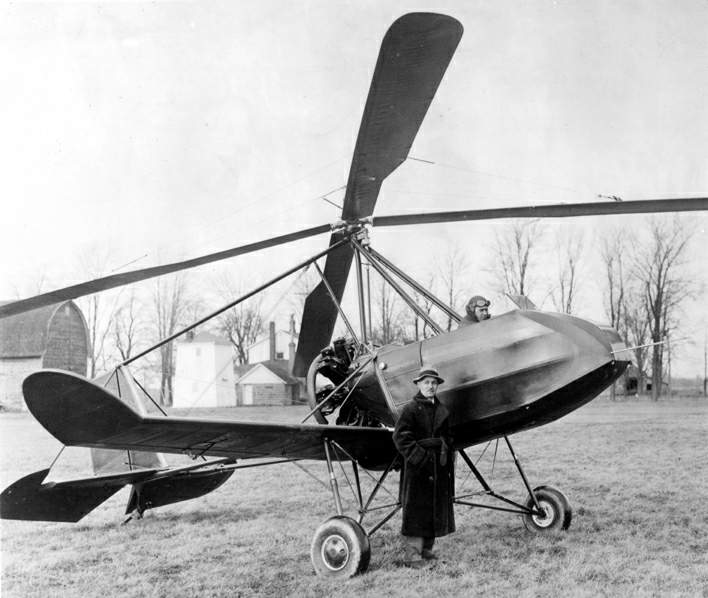
Buhl A-1 Autogyro with rear push propeller (1931)

De la Cierva's early autogyros were fitted with fixed rotor hubs, small fixed wings, and control surfaces like those of a fixed-wing aircraft. At low airspeeds, the control surfaces became ineffective and could readily lead to loss of control, particularly during landing. In response, de la Cierva developed a direct control rotor hub, which could be tilted in any direction by the pilot. De la Cierva's direct control was first developed on the Cierva C.19 Mk. V and saw the production on the Cierva C.30 series of 1934. In March 1934, this type of autogyro became the first rotorcraft to take off and land on the deck of a ship, when a C.30 performed trials on board the Spanish navy seaplane tender Dédalo off Valencia.

Later that year, during the leftist Asturias revolt in October, an autogyro made a reconnaissance flight for the loyal troops, marking the first military employment of a rotorcraft.

When improvements in helicopters made them practical, autogyros became largely neglected. Also, they were susceptible to ground resonance. They were, however, used in the 1930s by major newspapers, and by the United States Postal Service for the mail service between cities in the northeast.

=== Winter War ===
During the Winter War of 1939–1940, the Red Army Air Force used armed Kamov A-7 autogyros to provide fire correction for artillery batteries, carrying out 20 combat flights. The A-7 was the first rotary-wing aircraft designed for combat, armed with one 7.62×54mmR PV-1 machine gun, a pair of Degtyaryov machine guns, and six RS-82 rockets or four FAB-100 bombs.

=== World War II ===
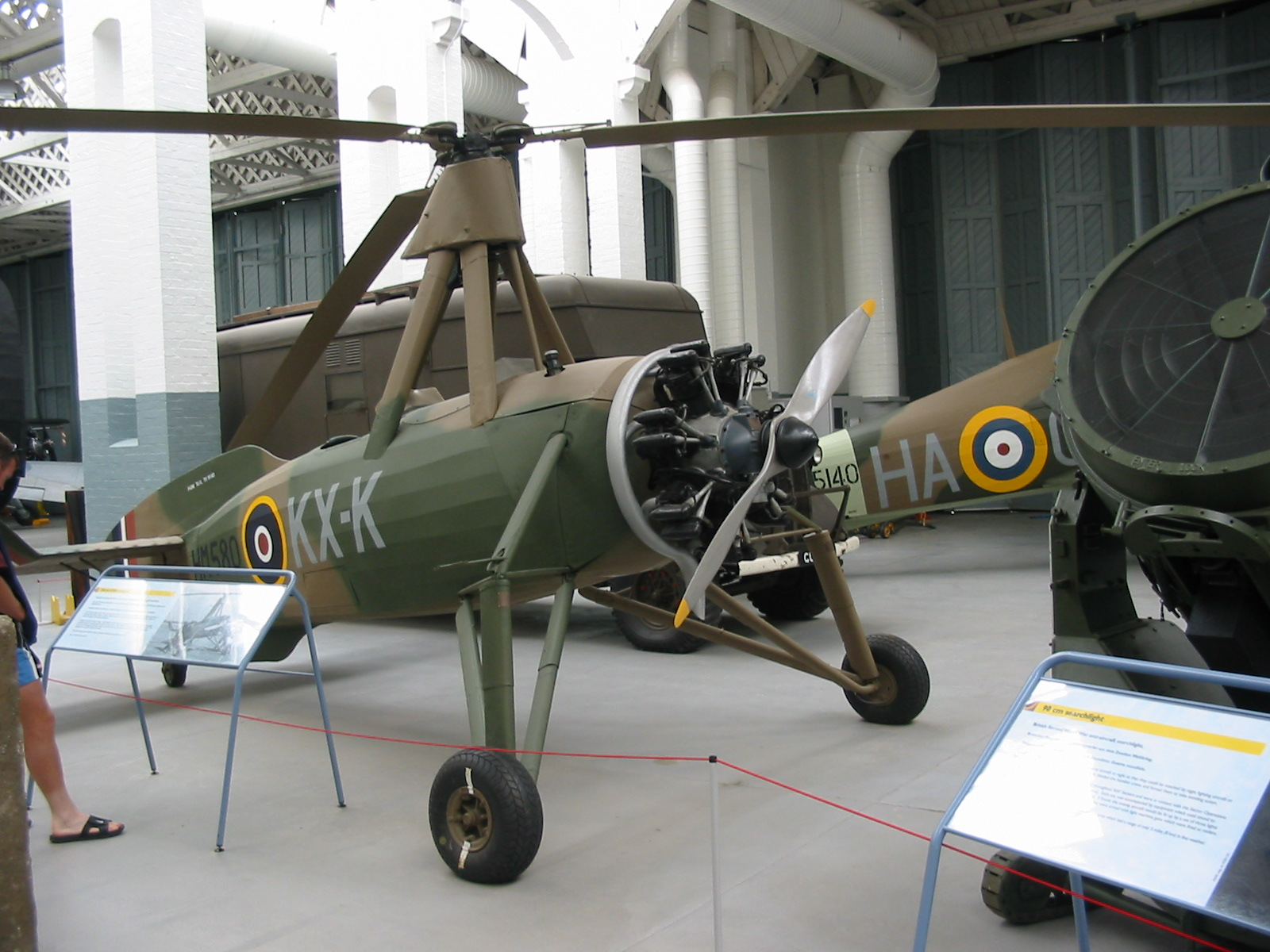
Royal Air Force Avro Rota Mk 1 Cierva Autogiro C30 A, at the Imperial War Museum Duxford, UK

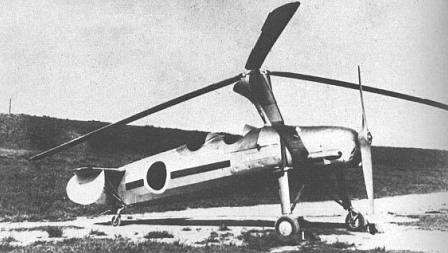
Kayaba Ka-1

The Avro Rota autogyro, a military version of the Cierva C.30, was used by the Royal Air Force to calibrate coastal radar stations during and after the Battle of Britain.

In World War II, Germany pioneered a very small gyroglider rotor kite, the Focke-Achgelis Fa 330 "Bachstelze" (wagtail), towed by U-boats to provide aerial surveillance.

The Imperial Japanese Army developed the Kayaba Ka-1 autogyro for reconnaissance, artillery-spotting, and anti-submarine uses. The Ka-1 was based on the Kellett KD-1 first imported to Japan in 1938. The craft was initially developed for use as an observation platform and for artillery spotting duties. The army liked the craft's short take-off span, and especially its low maintenance requirements. Production began in 1941, with the machines assigned to artillery units for spotting the fall of shells. These carried two crewmen: a pilot and a spotter.

Later, the Japanese Army commissioned two small aircraft carriers intended for coastal antisubmarine (ASW) duties. The spotter's position on the Ka-1 was modified to carry one small depth charge. Ka-1 ASW autogyros operated from shore bases as well as the two small carriers. They appear to have been responsible for at least one submarine sinking.

With the beginning of German invasion in USSR June 1941, the Soviet Air Force organized new courses for training Kamov A-7 aircrew and ground support staff. In August 1941, per the decision of the chief artillery directorate of the Red Army, based on the trained flight group and five combat-ready A-7 autogyros, the 1st autogyro artillery spotting aircraft squadron was formed, which was included in the strength of the 24th Army of the Soviet Air Force, combat active in the area around Elnya near Smolensk. From 30 August to 5 October 1941 the autogyros made 19 combat sorties for artillery spotting. Not one autogyro was lost in action, while the unit was disbanded in 1942 due to the shortage of serviceable aircraft.

=== Postwar developments ===
The autogyro was resurrected after World War II when Igor Bensen, a Russian immigrant in the United States, saw a captured German U-boat's Fa 330 gyroglider and was fascinated by its characteristics. At work, he was tasked with the analysis of the British military Rotachute gyro glider designed by an expatriate Austrian, Raoul Hafner. This led him to adapt the design for his purposes and eventually market the Bensen B-7 in 1955. Bensen submitted an improved version, the Bensen B-8M, for testing to the United States Air Force, which designated it the X-25. The B-8M was designed to use surplus McCulloch engines used on flying unmanned target drones.

Ken Wallis developed a miniature autogyro craft, the Wallis autogyro, in England in the 1960s, and autogyros built similar to Wallis' design appeared for many years. Ken Wallis' designs have been used in various scenarios, including military training, police reconnaissance, and in a search for the Loch Ness Monster, as well as an appearance in the 1967 James Bond movie You Only Live Twice.

Three different autogyro designs have been certified by the Federal Aviation Administration for commercial production: the Umbaugh U-18/Air & Space 18A of 1965, the Avian 2/180 Gyroplane of 1967, and the McCulloch J-2 of 1972. All have been commercial failures, for various reasons.

The Kaman KSA-100 SAVER (Stowable Aircrew Vehicle Escape Rotorseat) is an aircraft-stowable gyroplane escape device designed and built for the United States Navy. Designed to be installed in naval combat aircraft as part of the ejection sequence, only one example was built and it did not enter service. It was powered by a Williams WRC-19 turbofan making it the first jet-powered autogyro.

=== Bensen Gyrocopter ===
The basic Bensen Gyrocopter design is a simple frame of square aluminium or galvanized steel tubing, reinforced with triangles of lighter tubing. It is arranged so that the stress falls on the tubes, or special fittings, not the bolts. A front-to-back keel mounts a steerable nosewheel, seat, engine, and vertical stabilizer. Outlying mainwheels are mounted on an axle. Some versions may mount seaplane-style floats for water operations.

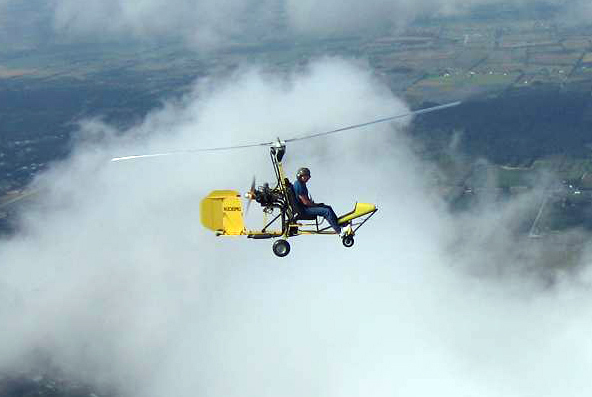
Bensen Aircraft B8MG Gyrocopter

Bensen-type autogyros use a pusher configuration for simplicity and to increase visibility for the pilot. Power can be supplied by a variety of engines. McCulloch drone engines, Rotax marine engines, Subaru automobile engines, and other designs have been used in Bensen-type designs.

The rotor is mounted atop the vertical mast. The rotor system of all Bensen-type autogyros is of a two-blade teetering design. There are some disadvantages associated with this rotor design, but the simplicity of the rotor design lends itself to ease of assembly and maintenance and is one of the reasons for its popularity. Aircraft-quality birch was specified in early Bensen designs, and a wood/steel composite is used in the world-speed-record-holding Wallis design. Gyroplane rotor blades are made from other materials such as aluminium and GRP-based composite.

Bensen's success triggered several other designs, some of them fatally flawed with an offset between the centre of gravity and thrust line, risking a power push-over (PPO or buntover) causing the death of the pilot and giving gyroplanes, in general, a poor reputation—in contrast to de la Cierva's original intention and early statistics. Most new autogyros are now safe from PPO.

=== 21st-century development and use ===
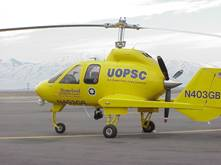
GBA's Hawk 4 provided perimeter patrol during the 2002 Winter Olympics.

In 2002, a Groen Brothers Aviation's Hawk 4 provided perimeter patrol for the Winter Olympics and Paralympics in Salt Lake City, Utah. The aircraft completed 67 missions and accumulated 75 hours of maintenance-free flight time during its 90-day operational contract.

Worldwide, over 1,000 autogyros are used by authorities for military and law enforcement. The first U.S. police authorities to evaluate an autogyro were the Tomball, Texas, police, on a $40,000 grant from the U.S. Department of Justice together with city funds, costing much less than a helicopter to buy ($75,000) and operate ($50/hour). Although it is able to land in 40-knot crosswinds, a minor accident happened when the rotor was not kept under control in a wind gust.

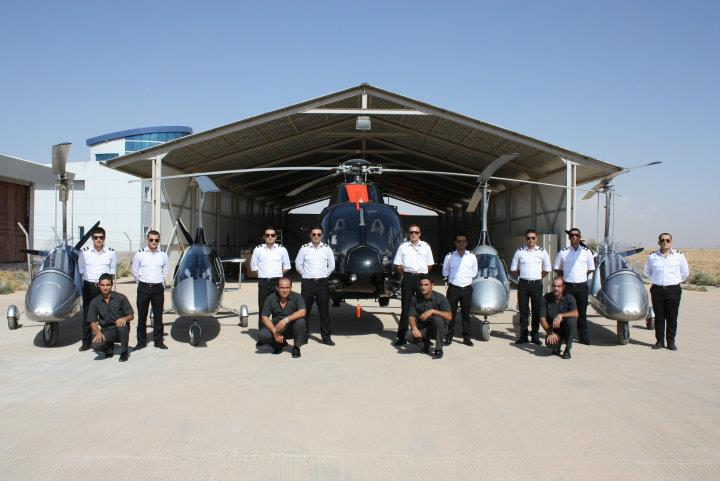
Autogyros and helicopters of the Kurdish Police

Since 2009, several projects in Iraqi Kurdistan have been realized. In 2010, the first autogyro was handed over to the Kurdish Minister of Interiors, Mr. Karim Sinjari. The project for the interior ministry was to train pilots to control and monitor the approach and takeoff paths of the airports in Erbil, Sulaymaniyah, and Dohuk to prevent terrorist encroachments. The gyroplane pilots also form the backbone of the pilot crew of the Kurdish police, who are trained to pilot on Eurocopter EC 120 B helicopters.

In 18 months from 2009 to 2010, the German pilot couple Melanie and Andreas Stützfor undertook the first world tour by autogyro, in which they flew several different gyroplane types in Europe, southern Africa, Australia, New Zealand, the United States, and South America. The adventure was documented in the book "WELTFLUG – The Gyroplane Dream" and in the film "Weltflug.tv –The Gyrocopter World Tour".

=== Unmanned autogyros ===
While most autogyros have historically been manned, recent decades have seen the development of unmanned autogyros for specialized applications. These unmanned aerial vehicles (UAV) leverage the simplicity and stability of the autogyro configuration while eliminating the need for onboard pilots, making them suitable for missions in hazardous flight conditions.

The MMIST CQ-10 SnowGoose was among the earliest examples, designed for cargo delivery in military operations. Later developments, such as the BAE Systems Ampersand, explored reconnaissance and surveillance capabilities using an optionally piloted autogyro.

In the scientific domain, the ThunderFly TF-G2 represents a modern autogyro UAV designed for atmospheric research. It is used for atmospheric profiling and meteorological data collection, particularly in conditions unsuitable for conventional fixed-wing UAVs.

== Helicopter autogyration ==
While autogyros are not helicopters, helicopters are capable of autorotation. If a helicopter suffers a power failure, the pilot can adjust the collective pitch to keep the rotor spinning generating enough lift to touch down and skid in a relatively soft landing via autorotation of its rotor disc.

== Certification by national aviation authorities ==
=== United Kingdom certification ===
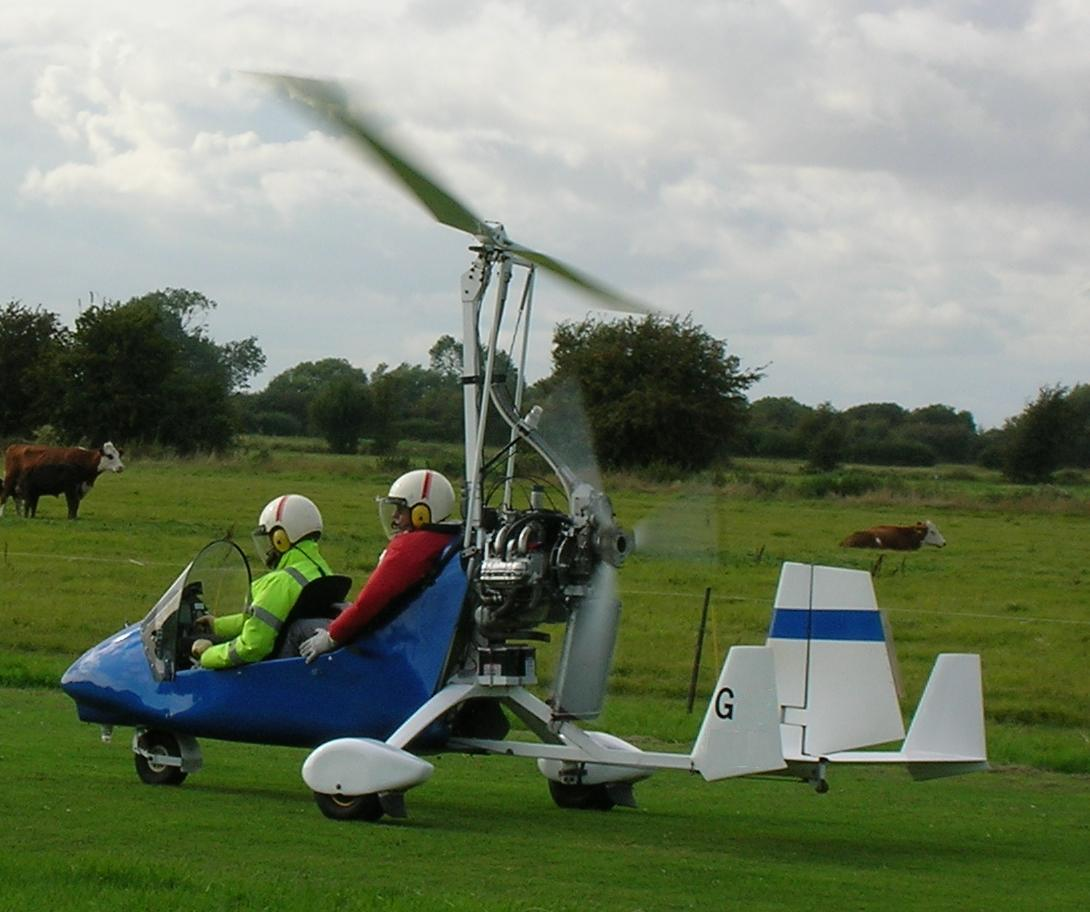
A VPM M-16 commences its take-off roll

Some autogyros, such as the Rotorsport MT03, MTO Sport (open tandem), and Calidus (enclosed tandem), and the Magni Gyro M16C (open tandem) and M24 (enclosed side by side) have type approval by the United Kingdom Civil Aviation Authority (CAA) under British Civil Airworthiness Requirements CAP643 Section T. Others operate under a permit to fly issued by the Popular Flying Association similar to the U.S. experimental aircraft certification. However, the CAA's assertion that autogyros have a poor safety record means that a permit to fly will be granted only to existing types of an autogyro. All new types of autogyro must be submitted for full type approval under CAP643 Section T. The CAA allows gyro flight over congested areas.

In 2005, the CAA issued a mandatory permit directive (MPD) which restricted operations for single-seat autogyros and were subsequently integrated into CAP643 Issue 3 published on 12 August 2005. The restrictions are concerned with the offset between the centre of gravity and thrust line and apply to all aircraft unless evidence is presented to the CAA that the CG/Thrust Line offset is less than 2 inches (5 cm) in either direction. The restrictions are summarised as follows:

- Aircraft with a cockpit/nacelle may be operated only by pilots with more than 50 hours of solo flight experience following the issue of their licence.
- Open-frame aircraft are restricted to a minimum speed of 30 mph (48 km/h; 26 kn), except in the flare.
- All aircraft are restricted to a Vne (maximum airspeed) of 70 mph (110 km/h; 61 kn)
- Flight is not permitted when surface winds exceed 17 mph (27 km/h; 15 kn) or if the gust spread exceeds 12 mph (19 km/h; 10 kn)
- Flight is not permitted in moderate, severe, or extreme turbulence and airspeed must be reduced to 63 mph (101 km/h; 55 kn) if turbulence is encountered mid-flight.

These restrictions do not apply to autogyros with type approval under CAA CAP643 Section T, which are subject to the operating limits specified in the type approval.

=== United States certification ===
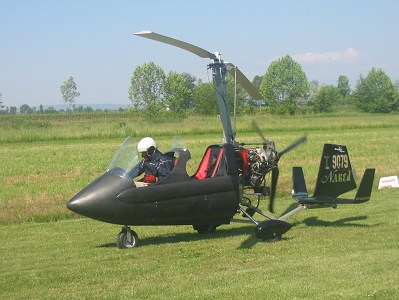
A Super Genie autogyro readying for takeoff

A certificated autogyro must meet mandated stability and control criteria; in the United States these are outlined in Federal Aviation Regulations Part 27: Airworthiness Standards: Normal Category Rotorcraft. The U.S. Federal Aviation Administration issues a Standard Airworthiness Certificate to qualified autogyros. Amateur-built or kit-built aircraft are operated under a Special Airworthiness Certificate in the Experimental category. Per FAR 1.1, the FAA uses the term "gyroplane" for all autogyros, regardless of the type of airworthiness certificate.

== World records ==
In 1931, Amelia Earhart (U.S.) flew a Pitcairn PCA-2 to a women's world altitude record of 18,415 ft (5,613 m).

Wing Commander Ken Wallis (U.K.) held most of the autogyro world records during his autogyro flying career. These include a time-to-climb, a speed record of 189 km/h (111.7 mph), and the straight-line distance record of 869.23 km (540.11 mi). On 16 November 2002, at 89 years of age, Wallis increased the speed record to 207.7 km/h (129.1 mph) – and simultaneously set another world record as the oldest pilot to set a world record.

Until 2019, the autogyro was one of the last remaining types of aircraft which had not yet circumnavigated the globe. The 2004 Expedition Global Eagle was the first attempt to do so using an autogyro. The expedition set the record for the longest flight over water by an autogyro during the segment from Muscat, Oman, to Karachi. The attempt was finally abandoned because of bad weather after having covered 7,500 miles (12,100 km).

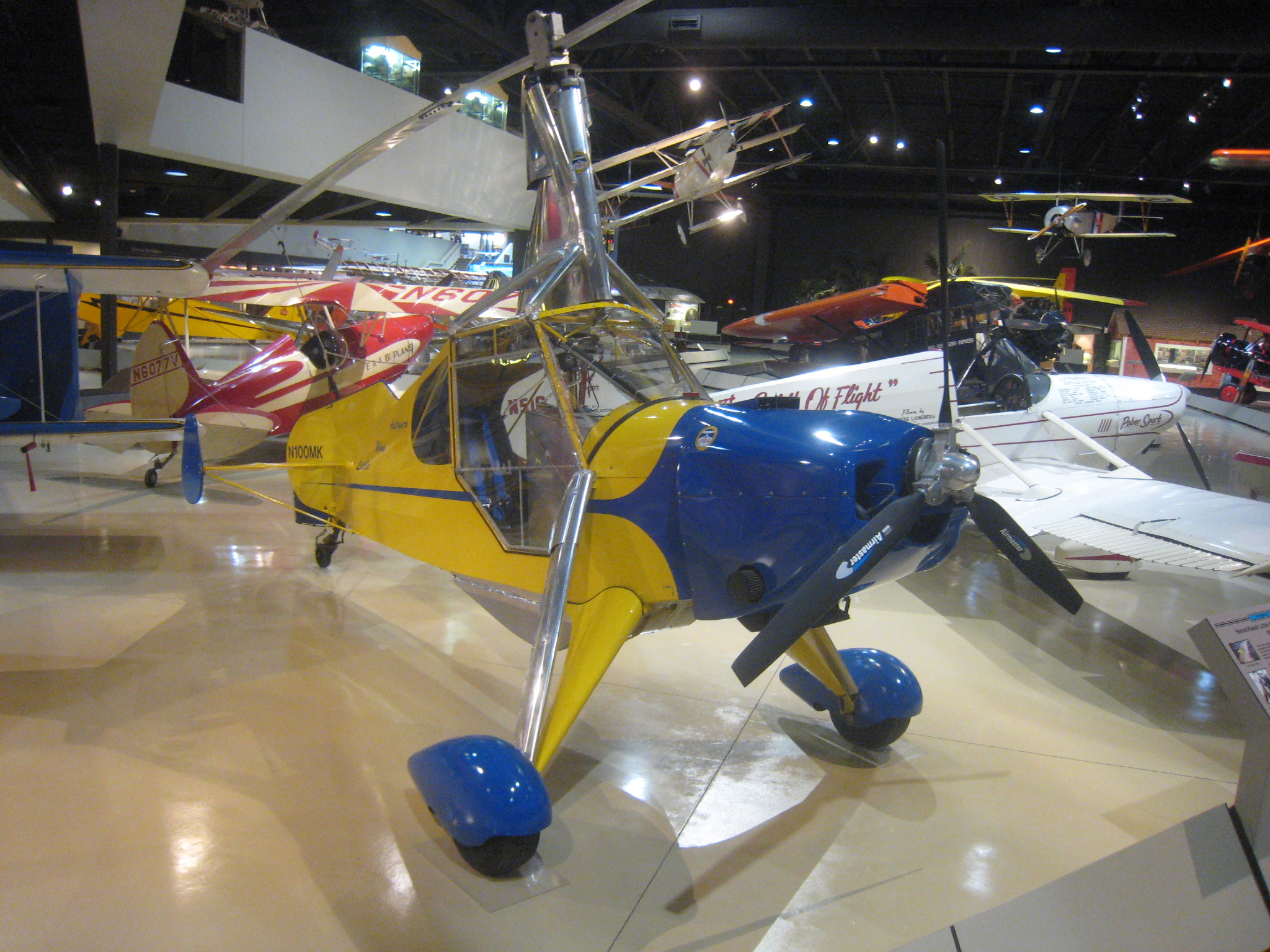
Little Wing Autogyro

As of 2014, Andrew Keech (U.S.) holds several records. He made a transcontinental flight in his self-built Little Wing Autogyro "Woodstock" from Kitty Hawk, North Carolina, to San Diego, California, in October 2003, breaking the record set 72 years earlier by Johnny Miller in a Pitcairn PCA-2. He also set three world records for speed over a recognized course. On 9 February 2006 he broke two of his world records and set a record for distance, ratified by the Fédération Aéronautique Internationale (FAI): Speed over a closed circuit of 500 km (311 mi) without payload: 168.29 km/h (104.57 mph), speed over a closed circuit of 1,000 km (621 mi) without payload: 165.07 km/h (102.57 mph), and distance over a closed circuit without landing: 1,019.09 km (633.23 mi).

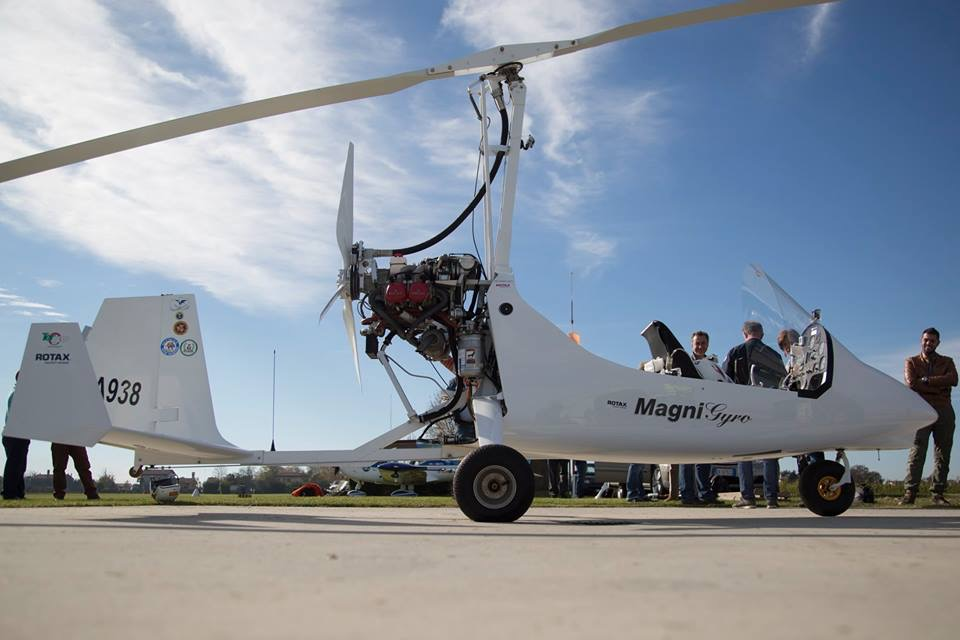
MagniGyro M16 – Altitude world record holder

On 7 November 2015, the Italian astrophysicist and pilot Donatella Ricci took off with a MagniGyro M16 from the Caposile aerodrome in Venice, aiming to set a new altitude world record. She reached an altitude of 8,138.46 m (26,701 ft), breaking the women's world altitude record held for 84 years by Amelia Earhart. The following day, she increased the altitude by a further 261 m, reaching 8,399 m (27,556 ft), setting the new altitude world record with an autogyro. She improved by 350 m (+4.3%) the preceding record established by Andrew Keech in 2004.

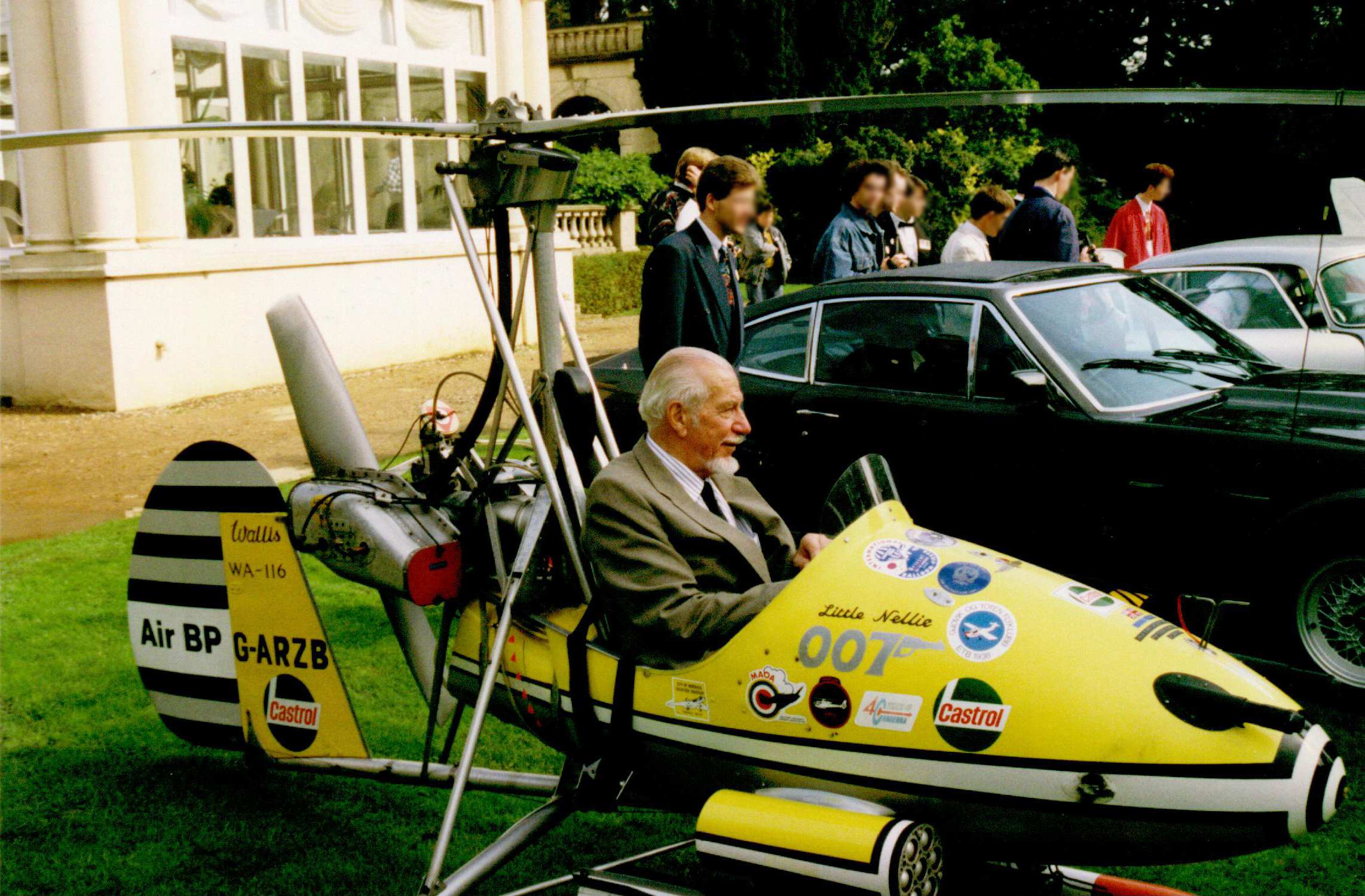
Autogyro Little Nellie with its creator and pilot, Ken Wallis

List of autogyro records
Year	Pilot	Record type	Record	Aircraft	Notes
1998	Ken Wallis (U.K.)	Time to climb 3000m	7:20 min	Wallis Type WA-121/Mc (G-BAHH)	
2002	Ken Wallis (U.K.)	Speed over a 3 km course	207.7 km/h	Wallis Type WA-121/Mc (G-BAHH)	Oldest pilot to set the record
2015	Donatella Ricci (ITA)	Altitude	8399 m	Magni M16 – Rotax 914 engine	
2015	Paul A Salmon (USA)	Distance without landing	1653.0 km	Magni M22-Missing Link II (N322MG)	10 November 2015
2015	Norman Surplus (U.K.)	First crossing of the Atlantic Ocean	5.3 km/h	Autogyro MT-03 (G-YROX)	11 August 2015
2019	Norman Surplus (U.K.)	First physical circumnavigation of the world (4 years 28 days)	not submitted for speed record	Autogyro MT-03 (G-YROX)	28 June 2019
2019	James Ketchell (U.K.)	First circumnavigation of the world and speed around the world, eastbound	44,450 km	Magni M16C (G-KTCH)	22 September 2019

Norman Surplus, from Larne in Northern Ireland, became the second person to attempt a world circumnavigation by gyroplane/autogyro type aircraft on 22 March 2010, flying a Rotorsport UK MT-03 Autogyro, registered G-YROX. Surplus was unable to get permission to enter Russian airspace from Japan, but he established nine world autogyro records on his flight between Northern Ireland and Japan between 2010 and 2011. FAI world records for autogyro flight.

G-YROX was delayed (by the Russian impasse) in Japan for over three years before being shipped across the Pacific to the state of Oregon, United States. From 1 June 2015, Surplus flew from McMinnville, Oregon, across the continental United States, through northern Canada/Greenland, and in late July/August made the first crossing of the North Atlantic by autogyro aircraft to land back in Larne, Northern Ireland on 11 August 2015. He established a further ten FAI World Records during this phase of the circumnavigation flight.

After a nine-year wait (since 2010), permission to fly U.K. registered gyroplanes through the Russian Federation was finally approved, and on 22 April 2019, Surplus and G-YROX continued eastwards from Larne, Northern Ireland, to cross Northern Europe and rendezvous with fellow gyroplane pilot James Ketchell piloting Magni M16 Gyroplane G-KTCH. Flying in loose formation the two aircraft made the first Trans-Russia flight by gyroplane together to reach the Bering Sea. To cross the Bering Strait, the two aircraft took off from Provideniya Bay, Russia on 7 June 2019 and landed at Nome, Alaska on 6 June having also made the first gyroplane crossing of the International Date Line. After crossing Alaska and western Canada, on 28 June 2019, Surplus piloting G-YROX, became the first person to circumnavigate the world in a gyroplane upon returning to the Evergreen Aviation and Space Museum, McMinnville, Oregon, U.S.

Over the nine years it had taken Surplus to complete the task, G-YROX flew 27,000 nautical miles (50,000 km) through 32 countries.

The first physical circumnavigation of the globe by an Autogyro, Oregon to Oregon, had taken Surplus and G-YROX, four years and 28 days to complete, after being dogged by long diplomatic delays in gaining the necessary permission to fly across Russian Federation Airspace. However, as the flight had been severely stalled and interrupted en-route by lengthy delays it was no longer deemed eligible for setting a first, continuously flown, speed record around the world and so this task was then left to James Ketchell to complete, by setting a first official speed record flight around the world for an Autogyro type aircraft, some three months later.

Subsequently, on 22 September 2019, Ketchell was awarded the world record from the Guinness World Records as the first circumnavigation of the world in an autogyro and from the Fédération Aéronautique Internationale for the first certified "Speed around the World, Eastbound" circumnavigation in an E-3a Autogyro. He completed his journey in 175 days.

== In popular culture ==
- In the 1934 film It Happened One Night, King Westley arrives for his wedding by flying an autogyro.
- The 1935 film The 39 Steps, directed by Alfred Hitchcock, has a chase scene involving an autogyro.
- The 1967 James Bond film You Only Live Twice includes an aerial chase sequence in which the hero flies an autogyro.
- In the 1979 Hayao Miyazaki anime The Castle of Cagliostro, the main antagonist Count Cagliostro flies an autogyro.
- In the 1981 film Mad Max 2, the character known as The Gyro Captain (Bruce Spence) pilots an autogyro, scavenging the Wasteland.
- The 1991 film The Rocketeer includes an autogyro.

== See also ==
- Gyrodyne
- CarterCopter / Carter PAV
- ELA Aviación
- Fairey Rotodyne
- PAL-V
- Piasecki Aircraft

	Aerostat	Aerodyne		
	Lift: Lighter than air gas	Lift: Fixed wing	Lift: Unpowered rotor	Lift: Powered rotor
Unpowered free flight	(Free) balloon	Glider	Helicopter, etc. in autorotation	(None – see note 2)
Tethered (static or towed)	Tethered balloon	Kite	Rotor kite	(None – see note 2)
Powered	Airship	Airplane, ornithopter, etc.	Autogyro	Gyrodyne, helicopter
