= Browns Bay =

Browns Bay or Brown's Bay may refer to

- Browns Bay (South Orkney Islands), Antarctica
- Browns Bay, New Zealand
- Browns Bay, Northern Ireland, United Kingdom
