= Cierva C.3 =

C.3

General information
- Type: experimental autogyro
- Manufacturer: Juan de la Cierva
- Designer: Juan de la Cierva
- Number built: 1

The Cierva C.3 was an experimental autogyro built by Juan de la Cierva in Spain in 1921. It was based on the fuselage of a Sommer monoplane, and was actually completed and tested before that aircraft. The C.3 utilised a single, three-bladed rotor in place of the coaxial double rotor tested on the C.1. A few short hops were achieved in testing and Cierva noted a tendency for the machine to want to roll over, thus alerting him to the problem of dissymmetry of lift that he would have to overcome in order to build a successful rotary-wing aircraft. The C.3 was damaged and rebuilt four times before being abandoned without having flown, la Cierva returning to work on the C.2.
