= Propeller walk =

Tendency of a propeller to yaw a vessel during acceleration

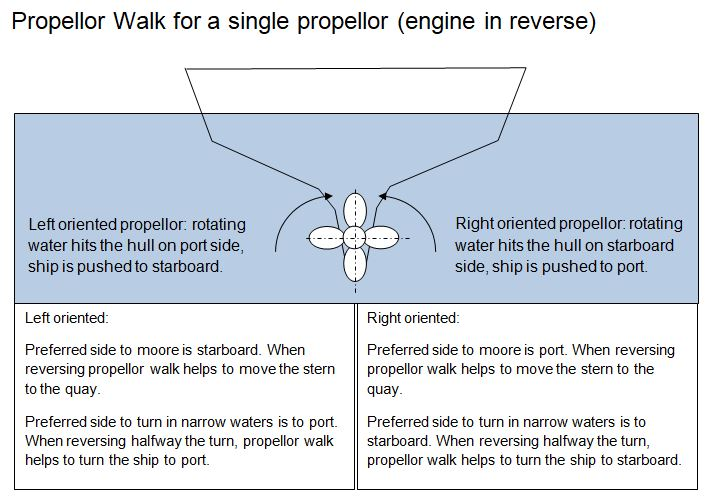
Propeller walk single propeller in reverse

Propeller walk (also known as propeller effect, wheeling effect, paddle wheel effect, asymmetric thrust, asymmetric blade effect, transverse thrust, prop walk) is the term for a propeller's tendency to rotate about a vertical axis (also known as yaw motion). The rotation is in addition to the forward or backward acceleration.

Knowing of and understanding propeller walk is important when maneuvering in small spaces. It can be used to one's advantage while mooring off, or it can complicate a maneuver if the effect works against the pilot.

== Effect ==
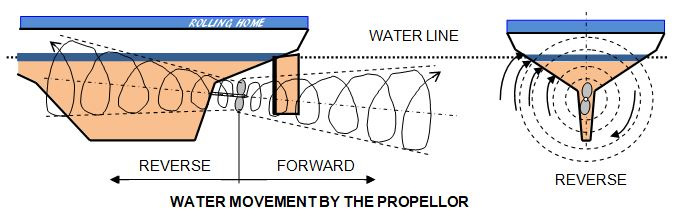
Axial and radial movement of propeller water (Note, the propeller on the left is right-handed whilst the one on the right is left-handed.)

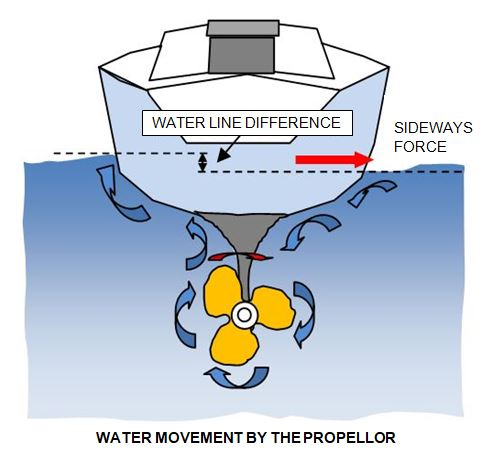
Radial movement of propeller water (left-handed prop)

A propeller is called right-handed if it rotates clockwise in forward gear (when viewed from the stern). A right-handed propeller in forward gear will tend to push the stern of the boat to starboard (thereby pushing the bow to port and turning the boat counter-clockwise) unless the rotation is corrected for. In reverse gear, the turning effect will be much stronger and with opposite direction (pushing the aft to port). A left-handed propeller acts analogically to the right-handed but with all rotation directions reversed.

== Cause ==
Propeller walk is caused by the water moved by the propeller in an axial direction and in a rotation. The water, coming from the propeller, gets a cone shape, widening when it leaves the propeller. If the rotating water cone contacts the ship's hull, a sideways force is generated. Propeller walk is hardly noticeable when sailing forward, since the propeller water will not hit a large surface of the ship's hull and corrections to the ship's course can easily be made with the rudder. When in reverse gear, the water will hit the hull directly, resulting in propeller walk.

== See also ==
- Seamanship – Art, competence, and knowledge of operating a craft on water
- P-factor – Yawing force caused by a rotating propeller
