= Cierva C.2 =

C.2

General information
- Type: experimental autogyro
- Manufacturer: Juan de la Cierva
- Designer: Juan de la Cierva
- Number built: 1

The Cierva C.2 was an experimental autogyro built by Juan de la Cierva in Spain in 1921-22. Following the failure of the C.1 the previous year, la Cierva started again from scratch, this time taking the fuselage from a Hanriot biplane and adding a five-bladed single rotor to it. Work was interrupted when Cierva ran out of funds, and the machine was not actually completed until 1922, after his next design, the C.3 had already been built and tested. Attempts to fly the aircraft resulted in repeated crashes, and the machine was rebuilt nine times before being finally abandoned.
