= ThunderFly TF-G2 =

Unmanned autogyro manufactured in the Czech Republic

ThunderFly TF-G2 autogyro
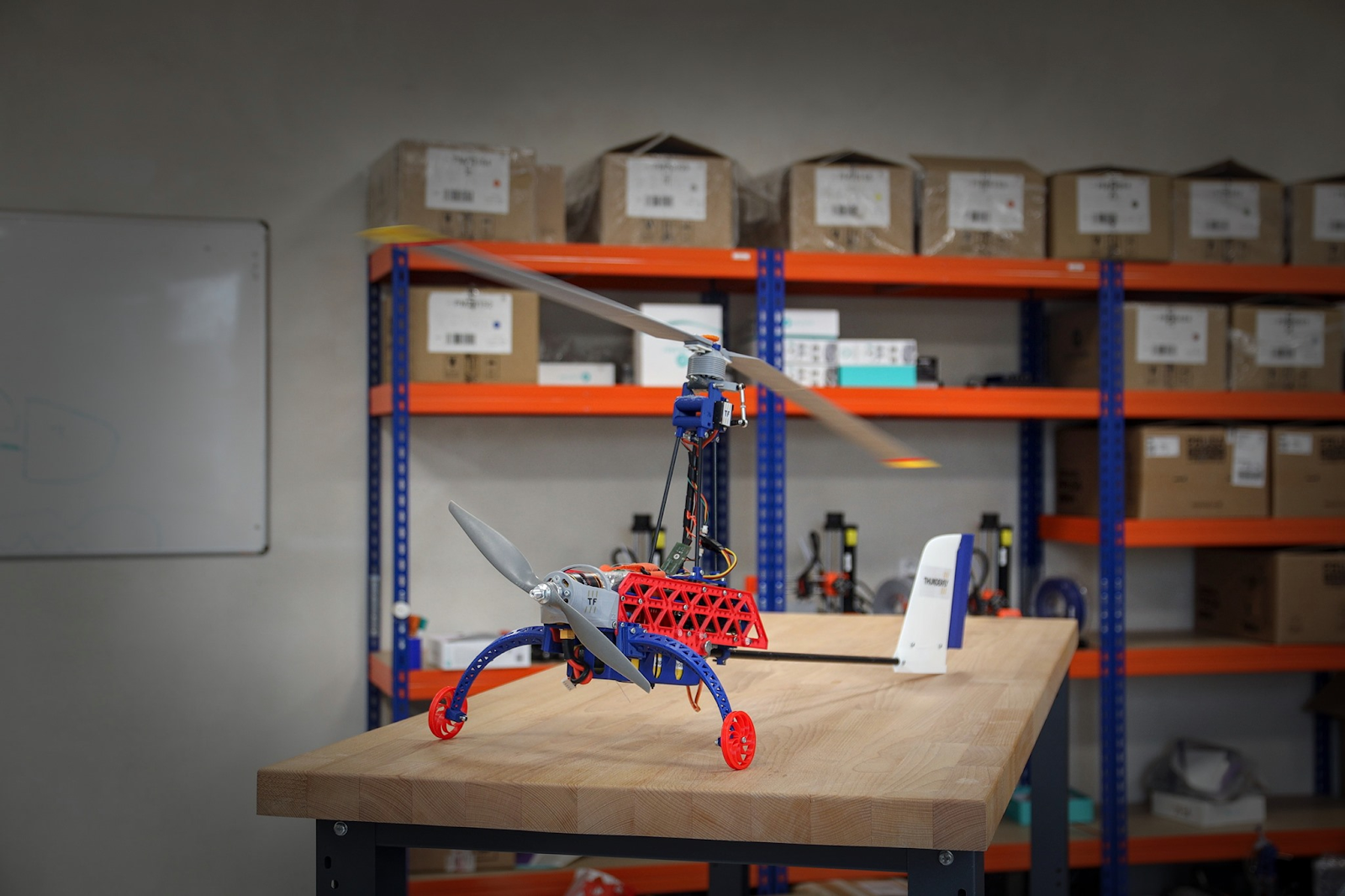
- TF-G2 unmanned gyroplane without rain cover

General information
- Type: Training and experimental unmanned autogyro
- Manufacturer: ThunderFly, Czech Republic
- Status: In service

History
- First flight: May 2020

ThunderFly TF-G2 is a UAV of autogyro type designed and manufactured in the Czech Republic. The first flight took place in May 2020. Its primary use involves simpler flight operations under adverse weather conditions, supporting applications from scientific research to air pollution monitoring. Thanks to the open-source hardware design and the use of 3D printing technology it can be easily modified for a specific application. A key feature of the TF-G2 autogyro is its ability to fly in strong winds with wind gusts (or more generally, to fly under severe meteorological conditions) setting it apart from similar-sized multicopters or aircraft that are not capable of such flights due to safety reasons. Another important feature of autogyro is an autorotation safety mode that enables a controlled (slow) descent even in the event of avionics failure.

== Use and control ==
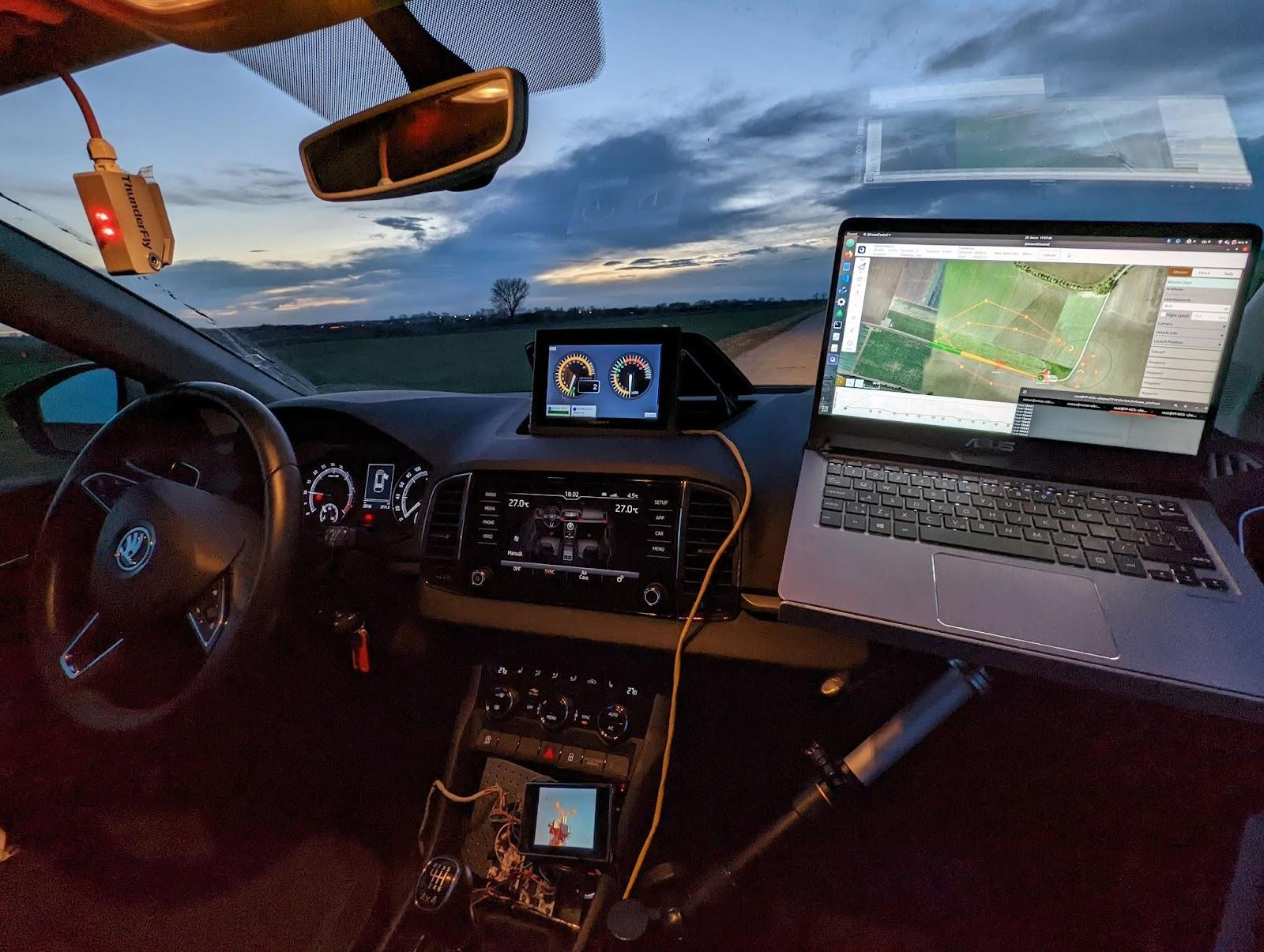
TF-G2 unmanned autogyro operator terminal for automated take-off from the roof of the car.

The unmanned autogyro TF-G2 is remotely controlled from a ground station by a pilot and a flight operator. It is possible to do so in an assisted mode when the pilot determines the direction of the flight and the integrated avionics takes care of flight parameters. An automated mode is also available when way-points generated by the control system enable automatic take-off, flight, and landing. TF-G2 also possesses safety mode that allow it to return to a take-off site or land in a safe area in case of communication loss or other failure.

To practice specific use scenarios of TF-G2 a simulation model designed for FlightGear simulator is used.

=== Take-off methods ===
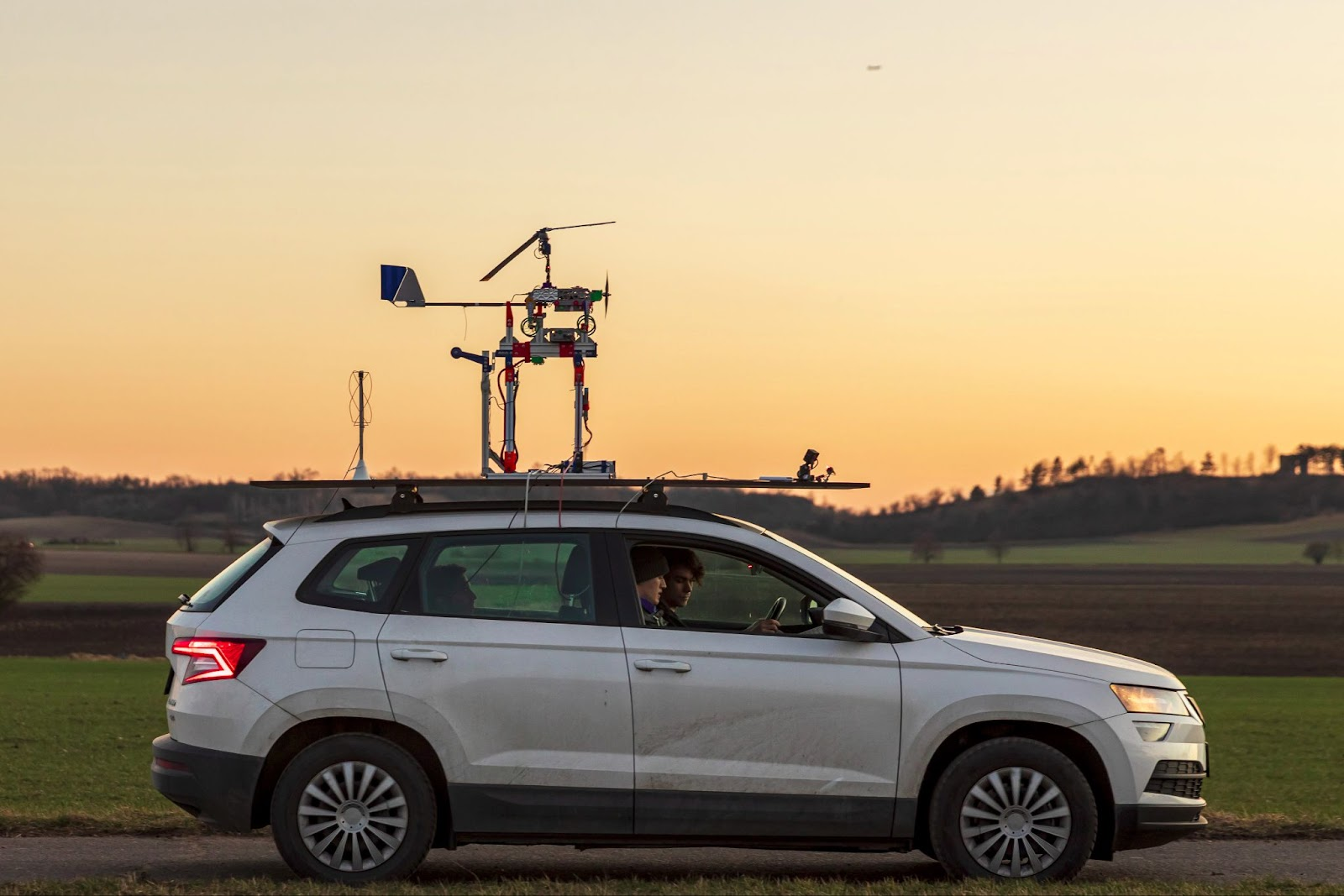
TF-G2 unmanned autogyro placed on a take-off platform.

TF-G2 unmanned autogyro's construction and design make it possible to take-off from the roof of a car, which, at the same time, serves as a ground control station. In this method, the car is used for achieving necessary rotor speed (revolutions) as it is driven along. Alternatively, the autogyro can take-off by throwing it from a hand. The necessary rotor revolutions are achieved during a short sprint. This take-off method is advantageous in that it does not need any additional equipment.

=== Communication and monitoring ===
TF-G2 autogyro uses a radio transmission with a MAVLink protocol to communicate with a ground station. At the same time, the data link is used to transmit data from sensors while carrying out flight tasks thanks to a set of open-source tools TF-ATMON. This system enables to connection of different sensors to the autogyro's avionics and at the same time makes use of an already existing power supply and radio data transmission channel. The solutions facilitate the minimization of the payload's weight (e.g. measuring apparatus).

== Technical parameters ==
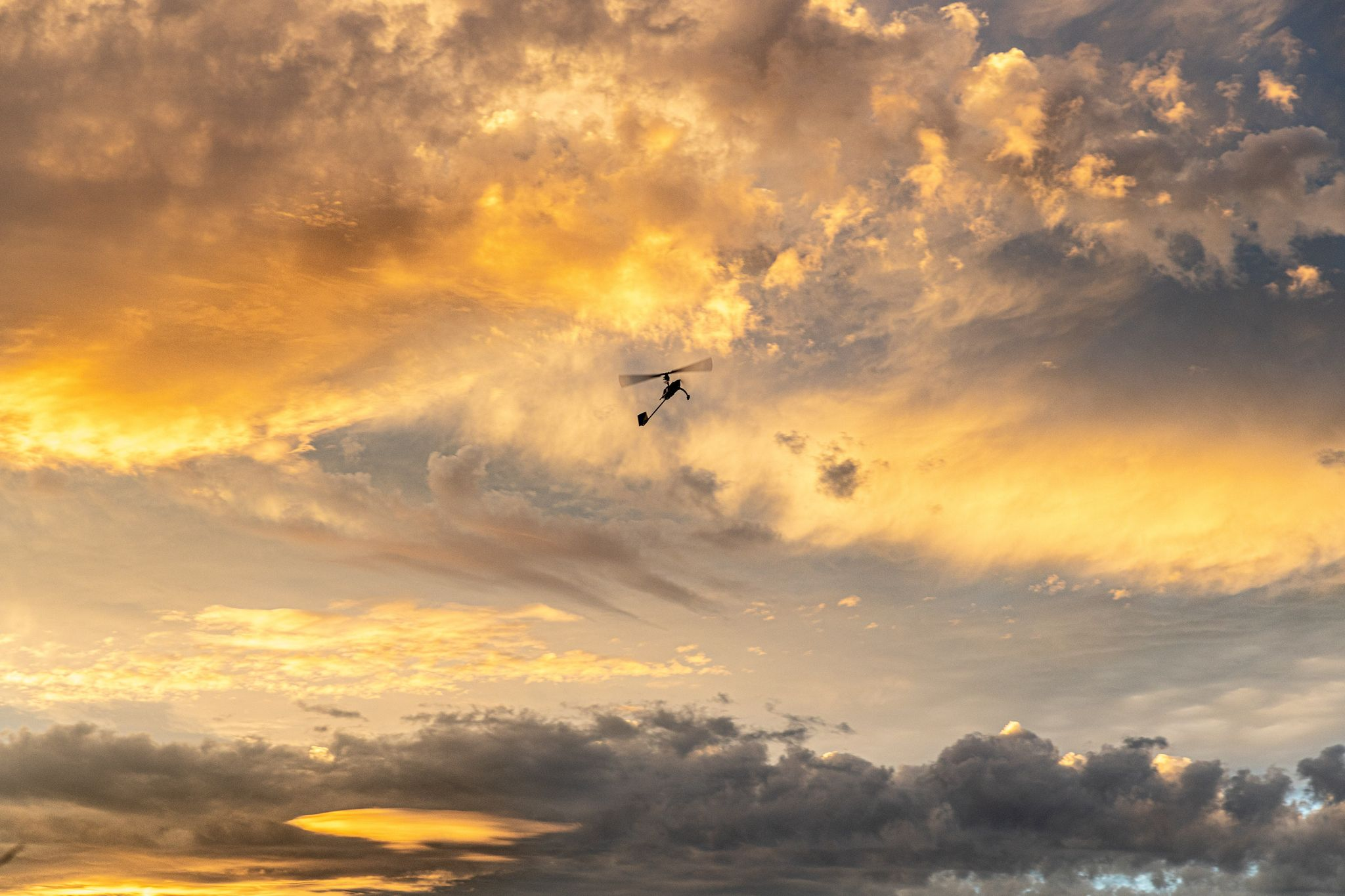
TF-G2 unmanned autogyro during measuring campaign.

- Maximum takeoff weight: 1.5 kg
- Electric engine BLDC
- 3D printed design (Fused filament fabrication technology)
- Airspeed flight range: 7–25 m/s
- Wind gust resistance: up to 10 m/s
- Payload capacity: 100g

== Payload ==
TF-G2 unmanned autogyro is designed to support the installation of a wide range of sensors for measuring atmospheric quantities. Apart from the mechanical design, this is supported by its electronics and software adapted for easy transmission of measured values to the ground station. The values are displayed in the form of a real-time interactive spatial map. Consequently, the flight trajectory can be easily adapted based on the measured data to effectively re-measure the places of interest. Examples of used measuring devices used for scientific research.

- Particulate matter sensor
- Temperature and humidity sensor
- Electric field sensor
- Semiconductor detector of ionizing radiation

== Areas of use ==
Take-off from a mobile platform (car) and a flight of TF-G2 unmanned autogyro.

TF-G2 is designed both as a training autogyro for pilots and operators of larger unmanned autogyros and as an aircraft able to withstand and fly under adverse meteorological conditions. Thanks to its parametric design and an ability to carry light detectors it is easily modifiable for specific purposes and tasks, e.g. Microscale meteorology atmospheric measurements.

Due to the above mentioned characteristics, it is for example used to monitor atmospheric pollution, or to measure electric field in storm clouds.

== See also ==
- Primoco UAV
