= Power push-over =

Action of aircraft

Power push-over (buntover) is the action of a gyroplane in which the aircraft experiences an uncommanded pitching motion forward by adding power.

It can be observed on gyroplanes which have a thrust line above the center of gravity and lack an adequate horizontal stabilizer. By increasing power the force of the propeller (thrust) induces a torque around lateral axis through the center of mass of the gyroplane. Designs having no horizontal stabiliser, or those having horizontal stabilisers not correctly positioned in the slipstream of the propeller, or of simply insufficient area will be unable to counter the forward pitching moment.

The danger from this action actually emanates from rapidly unloading the rotor. In gyroplanes, the rotor system is dependent on the relative wind direction and speed in order to autorotate at the desired rpm range and deliver lift and control. Unloading the rotor leads to rapid decay of rotor rpm, which invariably leads to loss of lateral and, in cases of no horizontal stabiliser, also longitudinal control, making a power push-over unrecoverable.

An unloading of the rotor can also be caused by pilot-induced oscillations.
