= Donatella Ricci =

Italian astrophysicist

- Born: 1963 (age 62–63); Rome, Italy
- Known for: Founder Flydonna, president of Association Donne dell'Aria (ADA), Sport Pilot
- Website: www.gyrodona.com

Donatella Ricci (Italian pronunciation Do'natɛlla Ree-chee / riːʧi) born in Rome, is an Italian astrophysicist, sport pilot of ultralight aircraft, holder of the world altitude record with gyroplane, hot air balloon, autogyro, helicopter pilot, founder of FlyDonna international meeting women in aviation and aeronautics, President of Italian Association ADA Donne dell'Aria, founded by Fiorenza de Bernardi, author and TEDx speaker.

== Career ==
Ricci graduated from Sapienza University of Rome with a PhD in astrophysics, and completed internships research on black holes at Goddard Space Flight Center, California, USA. At young age Ricci developed interest for flight. Enchanted by hot-air balloons, she soon trains in the Italian Alps Mondovì, where international Hot air balloon festival is held every year. While her professional career unfolded in the aerospace industry, Ricci cultivated her passion for flight and became PR Chairlady of Fédération Aéronautique Internationale, and the first female president of the Italian Hot-Air Balloon Association, and in 2001 all the way towards space when she was one of the first Italian female candidates to reach the final selections for astronauts of the European Space Agency (ESA). One of her colleagues became an astronaut.

Nevertheless, her desire to make the dream of flying accessible to an ever-larger number of women, made Ricci the founder of FlyDonna, an international meeting for women working in aviation and aerospace industry, held in Italy. Flydonna joined the Federation of European Women Pilots, founded in Rome in 1995. She was also president of Associazione Donne dell' Aria (Assoc. Women of the Air).

Currently Ricci is Leonardo S.p.A. helicopter division program manager, near Venice; cultivates her passion for flight and promotes its benefits on occasion of public appearances and at the flight school where she is a flight trainer.

== Book ==
Ricci is a speaker and has written a book about her achievement World Record for a Gyroplane: 27,556 feet above the ground Donatella Ricci (author), Samantha Cristoforetti (foreword).

With her book, Ricci wishes her experience and accomplishments to be of benefit for flight enthusiasts and pilots alike. During the months-long preparation and testing, many were the questions she had to find answers to, as she was preparing for a journey with a standard gyroplane MagniGyro M16 at altitudes never attempted.

=== Book versions ===
Donatella Ricci (author) Samantha Cristoforetti (foreword)

- Il record di volo in autogiro: 8.399 metri sopra il cielo. Mursia Publisher. 2017. Archived from the original on 2018-04-28. (Italy)
- Il record di volo in autogiro: 8.399 metri sopra il cielo. 2017. ASIN 8842558443. (Italy)
- World Record for a Gyroplane: 27,556 feet above the ground. Amazon. 2017. (United Kingdom)

== Awards ==
- Royal Aeronautical Society Specialist Award
- Honourable Company of Air Pilots Myles Bickerton Trophy

== World records ==
Near Jesolo and Venice, from Caposile airfield flying a MagniGyro M16 gyroplane, Donatella Ricci sets a total of nine world records in one flight as per Fédération Aéronautique Internationale.

Claimant	Sport	Subclass	Record Type	Record Performance	Date	Status
Donatella Ricci (ITA)	Microlights and paramotors	RGL1	Altitude	8 399 m	Nov 8, 2015	Current Record
Donatella Ricci (ITA)	Microlights and paramotors	RGL1	Time to climb to height 6 000 m	25 min 40 sec	Nov 8, 2015	Current Record
Donatella Ricci (ITA)	Rotorcraft	E-3a	Time to climb to height 3 000 m	13 min 44 sec	Nov 8, 2015	Current Record
Donatella Ricci (ITA)	Microlights and paramotors	RGL1	Altitude	8 399 m	Nov 8, 2015	Current Record
Donatella Ricci (ITA)	Rotorcraft	E-3a	Altitude without payload	8 399 m	Nov 8, 2015	Current Record
Donatella Ricci (ITA)	Microlights and paramotors	RGL1	Time to climb to height 3 000 m	13 min 44 sec	Nov 8, 2015	Current Record
Donatella Ricci (ITA)	Rotorcraft	E-3a	Time to climb to height 6 000 m	25 min 40 sec	Nov 8, 2015	Current Record
Donatella Ricci (ITA)	Microlights and paramotors	RGL1	Time to climb to height 3 000 m	13 min 44 sec	Nov 8, 2015	Current Record
Donatella Ricci (ITA)	Microlights and paramotors	RGL1	Time to climb to height 6 000 m	25 min 40 sec	Nov 8, 2015	Current Record
