= Expedition Global Eagle =

The Global Eagle logo as it appeared on the nose of the fuselage during the early stages of the effort

Expedition Global Eagle was the first attempt in history to circumnavigate the globe using an autogyro. The flight was attempted in 2004 by Warrant Officer Barry Jones using an open-cockpit autogyro which he named Global Eagle. The purpose of the mission was twofold; to set the world record and to raise funds for three charities; the Dyslexia Institute, the NSPCC and the British Red Cross. Jones embarked on his mission on 26 April 2004 from the Museum of Army Flying, Middle Wallop, Hampshire with an honorary military helicopter armada accompanying him during the send off. The expedition was supported by a team of soldiers based at Dishforth, North Yorkshire, United Kingdom.

The expedition encountered difficulties while flying through Europe, including the Alps and the Middle East and it was downgraded due to flight delays before finally being abandoned after it landed in Guwahati, India around the onset of monsoon season. Jones had set up a website where he described the details of each stage of his trip. The images of the flight as well as details of each stage of the flight were regularly uploaded on the website.

== History ==
The autogyro was the last remaining type of aircraft which has not a yet been used to circumnavigate the globe. The expedition was the first attempt ever to fly an autogyro around the Earth, a trip of about 25,000 miles (40,000 km). In February 2003, a year before the circumnavigation attempt, the Global Eagle broke the world range record by flying non-stop from Culdrose in Cornwall to Wick in Scotland, a total of 580 miles (928 km), after a flight lasting 7 hours and 23 minutes, breaking the old record of either 543.27 statute miles (874.32 km) or 869.23 km (540.11 mi) held by Wing Commander Ken Wallis. During the record-breaking trip Jones drifted toward North America due to a broken radio, before finally correcting the course. While flying over Wales he had to fly over the clouds in the open cockpit of the autogyro. He also flew for approximately 50 miles (80 km) over the North Sea which, as he acknowledged during an interview, was a dangerous course due to the fact the autogyro only had one engine and therefore in case it cut-off there would be no alternative solution but to crash land in the water. The average flight altitude was 4,000 ft and the average speed was 70 mph. In 2004, Jones, a Lynx helicopter pilot, was one of 75 licensed autogyro pilots in the UK. Later in 2003 the original Eagle suffered an accident during landing.

The circumnavigation attempt trip commenced on 26 April 2004 under the patronage of General Sir Michael Walker, Chief of Defence Staff of the British Armed Forces and it was supposed to last about three and a half months. The autogyro flight was to have touched down in twenty five countries with frequent landings due to the limited range of the autogyro. The Global Eagle's route was planned to approximately follow the flightpath taken by Brian Milton in 1998 when he became the first person to circumnavigate the globe using a microlight. Due to technical difficulties with the original gyrocopter the gyro at launch was supplied by the Italian manufacturer Magni Gyro which also supplied spare parts and technical assistance to the expedition. The new gyro featured a new colour scheme and the eagle logo was not used.

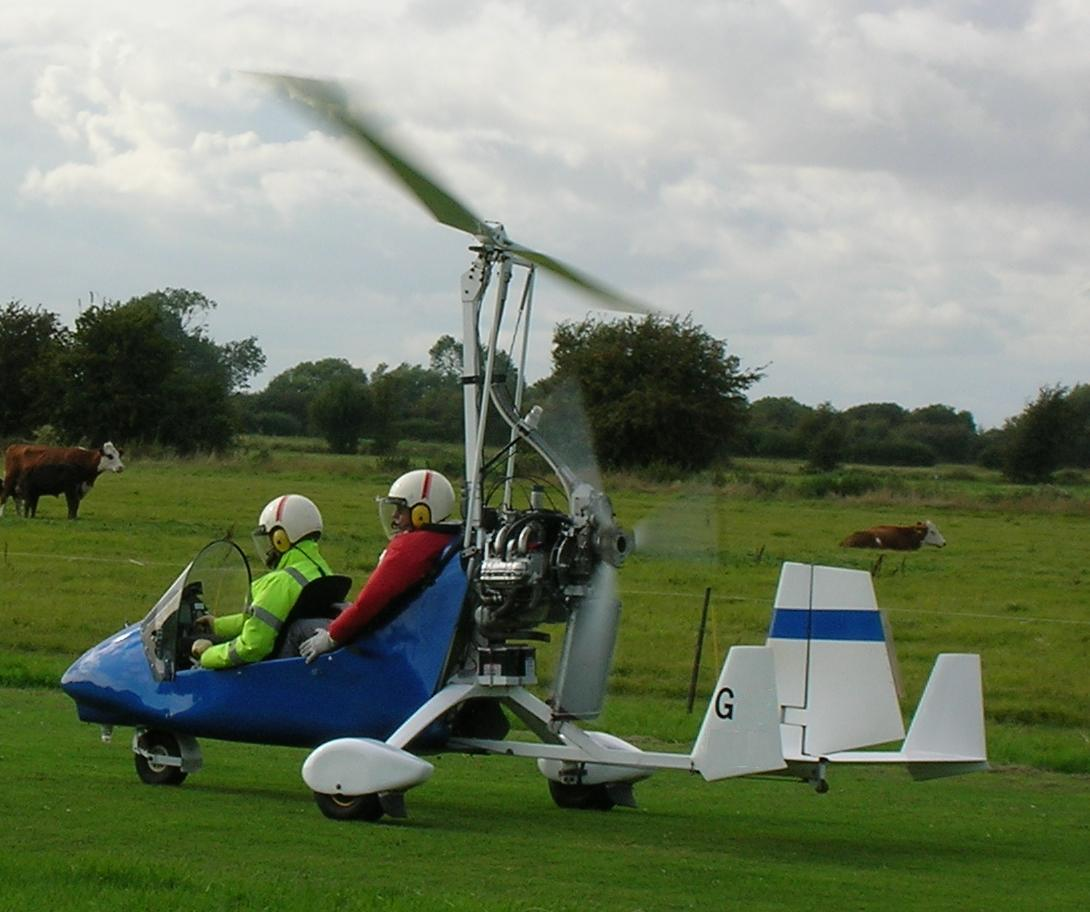
The Magni VPM M16 commencing its take-off roll. The same model was used in the Global Eagle expedition.

The expedition successfully completed the European leg of the journey which included Ostend, Belgium, Friedrichshafen, Germany, the Alps, Bolzano, Trento, Casaleggio Novara, the location of the Magni airfield in Italy, Forlì, Pescara, Bari, Italy, Corfu, Athens, Mykonos, Kos and Rhodes, in Greece and the military base of Akrotiri in Cyprus, albeit with delays. The journey through the Alps was very difficult because Jones had to climb to 10,000 feet over the Alps where it was extremely windy. Jones also had to make a forced landing in the Italian Alps. Also the trip from Athens to Akrotiri over the Mediterranean proved very frightening because flying over the water, with only a few ships below, meant that it would be very difficult to get any help in case of a mishap. From Akrotiri, Global Eagle went to Amman, Jordan, Turaif, Saudi Arabia, Arar, Hafr Al-Batin, Qaisumah, Jubail, Bahrain, Abu Dhabi in the Arab Emirates and Muscat, Oman.

Over Jordan and Saudi Arabia, Jones had to fly over the desert for hours and to battle sandstorms and hot weather at low altitudes while at higher altitudes it would become very cold. Further, communication was impossible while flying over the desert because of a lack of ground stations and the atmospheric conditions prevailing in the area. While there, Jones had to communicate with commercial aircraft flying over the desert which would then relay his messages to the ground stations at the local airports. A Saudia flight helped him approach and land at Turaif.

Subsequently, Jones arrived at Abu Dhabi and from there he flew to Muscat, Oman and then Gawadar and Ormara in Pakistan and, finally, Karachi. The flight from Muscat to Karachi broke the record for the longest flight over water by an autogyro and lasted six hours.

From Karachi, Jones flew the autogyro to India where it navigated to Ahmedabad, Udaipur, Jaipur, New Delhi, Bareilly, Gorakhpur, Patna and Baghdogra, sometimes through sandstorms, and finally landed during monsoon rains in the army base of Guwahati. The delays incurred in the European leg of the journey proved damaging to the effort because Jones was forced to arrive in India during monsoon season. The monsoons he encountered were the worst in 20 years with 100 people killed in the Guwahati area alone. The technical difficulties encountered in India, due to the weather, led to the downgrading of the purpose of the mission from circumnavigating the globe to flying to Australia.

Jones and his support team then returned to the UK in order to revise the plans for the truncated trip to Australia. Upon returning to India they discovered that the gyro while at the army base of Guwahati had spent time submerged in water. The transponder, the radio and the rest of the instruments were damaged. As well, the flying controls and the cables needed to be replaced. The damage totalled £10,000 and could not be raised on time. In addition the team members, being soldiers, had to return to active duty by early 2005. This led to the attempt being abandoned. The trip when cancelled had covered between 6,550–7,500 miles (10,480–12,100 km) and had lasted for four months due to the delays experienced, averaging approximately 350 miles per flight day. Even though the expedition did not succeed in its goal of circumnavigating the globe it demonstrated the wide range of conditions under which a light, open-cockpit autogyro could operate.

== Completed route details ==
The detailed route, times and other details of the completed trip were as follows:

- 26 April 2004: Departure from Middle Wallop — Ostend (Belgium): Total distance 300 km, including 70 km over the North Sea
- 30 April 2004: Ostend (EBOS, Belgium) — Friedrichshaven (Germany): — 630 km Total distance since start : 930 km
- 3 May 2004: Friedrichshafen (Germany) — Bolzano — Trento — Casaleggio, Novara (Italy): — Total distance: 457 km
- 3–6 May 2004: While on the way to Bolzano 60 km/h wind gusts cause Eagle to force land on a sports field 30 km north of Bolzano in the Alps.
- 7 May 2004: Departure from Bolzano at 0900z and landing at Magni airfield in Casaleggio, Italy 13:22 local time
- 10 May 2004: Depart Magni at 12:00 local time, refuelling at Forlì LIPK 11:23–13:00 — refuelling at Pescara LIBP — Arrival Bari LIBD (Italy) 1700 — Trip distance: 828 km Total distance since start : 2,215 km
- 12 May 2004: Lift-off from Bari at 10:21 local time — refuelling at Ioannis Kapodistrias International Airport Corfu LGKR. — Arrival at Athens Airport at 16:30 — Trip distance: 700 km Total distance since start : 2,915 km
- 13 May 2004: Departure from Athens 0800 — Refuelling at Myconos — refuelling at Kos. Strong headwinds force landing at Rhodes LGRD.
- 14 May 2004: Early morning lift-off from Rhodes and landing in Akrotiri (Cyprus) following a flight of more than 3 hours over the Mediterranean, with ground speed of sometimes over 170 km/h. Trip distance: 907 km Total distance since start: 3,822 km
- 16 May 2004: Akrotiri (Cyprus) — Amman (Jordan) : 420 km
- 17–19 May 2004: Break — 3 days off.
- 20 May 2004: Amman — Turaif (Saudi Arabia) — Ar'Ar : 580 km
- 21 May 2004: Ar'Ar — Hafr-AL-Batin : 420 km
- 22 May 2004: Hafr-AL-Batin — Al Quasumah — Jubail (Saudi Ar) — Bahrain: 593 km. Total distance since start : 5,835 km
- 24 May 2004: Bahrain — Abu Dhabi (Arab Emirates) : 452 km
- 26 May 2004: Abu Dhabi — Muscat (Oman): 410 km. Total distance since start: 6,697 km
- 30 May 2004: Muscat (Oman) — Karachi (Pakistan) : 880 km over the sea
- 1 June 2004: Karachi — Ahmedabad (India) : 592 km.
- 2 June 2004: Udaipur — Jaipur: 525 km.
- 3 June 2004: Jaipur — Delhi (India): 249 km — Sandstorms. Total distance since start: 8,943 km. Barry Jones sick with stomach disease, resting.
- 7 June 2004: Jones recovers, but the monsoon season has started. Waiting for delivery of administrative clearances
- 9 June 2004: Departs from Indira Gandhi International Airport (New Delhi, India) — Bareilly: 220 km. Barry Jones forced to return to Delhi due to inclement weather.
- 10 June 2004: Delhi — Bareilly: 249 km. Second attempt successful. Arrival at 10:05 local time.
- 11 June 2004: Bareilly-Gorakhpur: 436 km.
- 12 June 2004: Gorakhpur — — Patna — Baghdogra : 552 km. Departure at 08:30 local time. Arrival at 16:10 local time. Total distance since start: 10,150 km
- 13 June 2004: Baghdogra — Guwahati : 330 km. Delays due to bad weather
- 14 June 2004: Bad weather for the whole week. Flight clearances need to be renewed. Jones considers returning to Delhi using a commercial flight.
- 15 June 2004: Jones arrives in Delhi. Trying to recoup and rethink the plan. New flights will be over hills and jungles. Weather is bad.
- 21 June 2004: Baghdogra — Guwahati: 330 km. Jones departure at 0353 and arrival at Guwahati in monsoon rain. Flight time: 3 hrs 40 minutes.
- 21 June 2004: Rain continues. Total distance travelled since start: 10,480 km Route now changes to Australia as the final destination due to difficulties and bad weather.
- 1–5 October 2004: Barry Jones returns to India to re-evaluate mission. Decision is made to abandon effort.

== Remaining route ==
This is the list of the unfinished part of the expedition:

- India — Imphal
- Burma — Mandalay Intl
- Laos — Luang Prabang
- Vietnam — Noibai Intl
- China — Wuxu — Baiyun
- Hong Kong — Hong Kong Intl
- China — Gaoqi — Changle — Lishe — Hongqiao — Liuting — Beijing Intl — Zhoushuizi — Taoxian — Dafangshen — Taiping
- Russia — Igatevo — Sokoc — Ugolny — Provideniya Bay
- Alaska — Tin City — Nome — Koyuk — Pitka — Minchumina — Cantwell — Gulkana
- Canada — Burwash — Atlin — Dease Lake — Smithers — Belia Coola — Puntzi Mountain — Pemberton — Abbotsford
- USA — Plan not finalised
- Canada — Mirabel Intl —- Bagotville — Rimouski — Sept-Iles — Wabush — Schefferville — Kuujjuaq — Quaqtaq — Kimmirut — Iqaluit — Pangnirtung — Qikiqtarjuaq
- Greenland — Kangerlussuaq — Kulusuk
- Iceland — Reykjavik — Hornafjordur
- Denmark — Vagar
- UK — Kirkwall — Wick — Inverness — Leuchars — Edinburgh — Carlisle — Dishforth — Middle Wallop

== Technical specifications ==
The Magni gyrocopter model: Magni VPM M16 (Similar to the Magni M16 - 2000) used in the expedition had the following specifications:

- Weight: Empty weight 261/266 kg, maximum take-off gross weight 450 kg
- Maximum speed 115 mph
- Cruising speed 90 mph
- Absolute ceiling 4000 m
- Service ceiling 3500 m
- Take-off roll 70 m
- Landing roll from 0 to 30 m
- Rate of climb 5 m/s
- Fuel tank capacity 72 L
- Rotor diameter 8230/8535 mm
- Propeller diameter 1700 mm
- Overall width 1800 mm
- Overall length 4655 mm
- Overall height 2600 mm
- Airframe: chrome-alloy aeronautical 4130 steel, tig welded. Fiberglass fairing, wheel pants and instrument panel.
- Seat: epoxy / fiberglass with integral fuel-tank,
- Instruments: rotor tachometer, altimeter, air speed indicator, Flydat and fuel gauge
- Engine used for expedition: 914 Rotax Turbo, 4 cylinders, 4 stroke, water cooled, 115 hp, with electric starter and mechanical prerotator. (Also available: Rotax 912 ULS, 100 Hp)
- Propeller: three-blades, carbon fiber, ground adjustable pitch.
- Rotor: two-blades, composite.
- Controls: double. Electric trim.
