= Dissymmetry of lift =

Term in rotorcraft aerodynamics

retreating blade side	advancing blade side

Dissymmetry of lift (also known as asymmetry of lift or asymmetric lift) in rotorcraft aerodynamics refers to an unequal amount of lift on opposite sides of the rotor disc. It is a phenomenon that affects single-rotor helicopters and autogyros in forward flight.

A rotor blade that is moving in the same direction as the aircraft is called the advancing blade and the blade moving in the opposite direction is called the retreating blade. When viewed from above, most American helicopter rotors turn counter-clockwise; French and Russian helicopters turn clockwise.

Balancing lift across the rotor disc is important to a helicopter's stability. The amount of lift generated by an airfoil is proportional to the square of its airspeed (velocity). In a hover, the rotor blades have equal airspeeds and therefore equal lift. However, in forward flight the advancing blade has a higher airspeed than the retreating blade, creating uneven lift across the rotor disc.

== Analysis ==
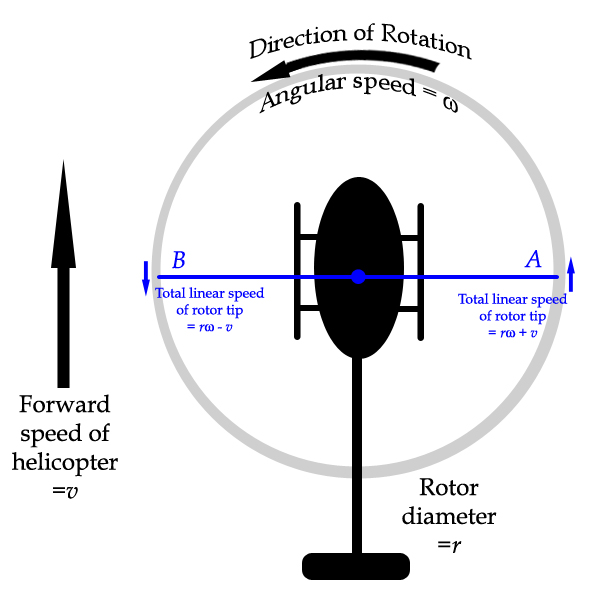
Dissymmetry of lift in an American-style helicopter

Consider a single-rotor helicopter in still air. For a stationary (hovering) helicopter, whose blades of length of r metres are rotating at ω radians per second, the blade tip is moving at a speed rω meters per second. As the blades rotate, the speed of the blade-tips relative to the air remains constant.

Now imagine the helicopter in forward flight, at v meters per second. The speed of the blade-tip at point A in the diagram relative to the air is the sum of the blade-tip speed and the helicopter forward-flight speed: rω+v. But the speed of the blade-tip at point B, relative to the air, is the difference of its rotational speed and the forward-flight speed: rω-v.

Since the lift generated by an aerofoil increases as its relative airspeed increases, on a forward-moving helicopter the blade-tip at position A produces more lift than that at point B. So the rotor disc produces more lift on the right hand side than on the left hand side (for an American-style helicopter). This imbalance is "dissymmetry of lift".

== Effects ==
Dissymmetry of lift causes a pitch backwards, not a roll.

At very high forward speeds, the retreating blade has insufficient airspeed to maintain lift, a condition called retreating blade stall. This causes the helicopter to roll to the retreating side and pitch up. This situation, when not immediately recognized can cause a severe loss of aircraft controllability. Retreating blade stall is a factor determining the maximum forward speed of the helicopter, the never-exceed speed (V_{NE}).

At very high forward speeds, the advancing blade may go supersonic. This is another factor determining the never-exceed speed.

== Counter-measures ==
Dissymmetry of lift is countered by reducing the angle of attack of the advancing blade and increasing the angle of attack of the retreating blade. This is done by blade flapping and cycling feathering.

Blade flapping is the primary means of countering dissymmetry of lift. Rotor blades are designed to flap: the advancing blade flaps up and develops a smaller angle of attack due to a change in relative wind vectors, thus producing less lift than a rigid blade would. Conversely, the retreating blade flaps down, develops a higher angle of attack due to a change in relative wind vectors, and generates more lift. Flapping results in flapback, a tilting backwards of the rotor disc.

Dissymmetry of lift is also countered by cyclic feathering, i.e. a change to the angle of incidence of the rotor blades as they rotate around the hub.

There is a limit to which angle of attack changes can counter dissymmetry of lift. This may impose a limit on the maximum forward speed of the helicopter, although in practice power limitations are often the limiting factor.

== Dual rotors ==
In helicopters with coaxial rotors, the two rotor discs rotate in opposite senses. The dissymmetry of lift of one rotor disc is cancelled by the dissymmetry of lift of the other rotor disc.

Tandem rotor helicopters such as the CH-47 Chinook still suffer from dissymmetry of lift, because the rotors are offset from one another. Tandem-rotor helicopters are installed with automatic cyclic feathering systems. At low airspeeds, blade flapping compensates for dissymmetry of lift. As airspeed increases, typically above 70 knots, these systems allow a more level fuselage attitude which reduces stresses on the rotor driving mechanisms.

== See also ==
- P-factor
- Cierva C.4
- Unequal rotor lift distribution
