= Flapback =

Helicopter aerodynamics phenomenon

Flapback or blowback is the tilting of a helicopter rotor disc, usually aft (backwards), which occurs in several circumstances.

In normal operating circumstances, forward flight results in flapback caused by dissymmetry of lift and the transverse flow effect. Dissymmetry of lift is where the forward-moving rotor blade has a faster airspeed, so it generates more lift, which would cause the rotor disc to tilt to the side. To prevent this the forward-moving blade flaps up, which reduces its angle of attack and the corresponding lift. At the same time, the rearward-moving rotor blade flaps down thereby increasing its angle of attack and lift. Thus, lift is balanced on both sides of the rotor disc. However, since the rotor blades climb on the advancing side and descend on the opposite side, this also results in the rotor disk being tilted to the rear. The transverse flow effect is where the front of the rotor disc is moving into undisturbed air, whereas the rear of the rotor disc is moving into downward-moving air. The front of the rotor disc therefore has a higher angle of attack, and generates more lift, causing flapback. As airspeed increases, the pilot must counter flapback by applying forward input to the cyclic control. During forward flight, if a gust of wind affects the helicopter from the front, increased flapback will decrease the forward speed of the helicopter. This causes the rotor disc to flap forward, leading to increased forward speed, and increasing subsequent oscillations, unless this is corrected by the pilot. Flapback also occurs when hovering in strong wind conditions.

During a rotor stall, the helicopter's rotor has too low an RPM. The angle of attack can be increased to compensate, however beyond a certain point the rotor blades stall and lift rapidly decreases. Rotor stalls are not recoverable because the descending helicopter has airflow moving upwards through the rotor disc, so even full down collective will not restore normal airflow. When the helicopter rotor stalls, it does not do so symmetrically, because forward airspeed causes higher airspeed on the advancing blade than on the retreating blade. The retreating blade stalls first and its weight makes it descend as it moves aft, while the advancing blade raises as it goes forward. The resulting low aft blade and high forward blade results in the rotor disc tilting backwards rapidly. As the aircraft descends, upward airflow on the tail boom and horizontal stabilizers tend to pitch the aircraft nose down. These two effects, combined with any aft cyclic by the pilot attempting to keep the aircraft level, can cause the rotor blades to blow back and contact the tail boom, in some cases severing it. The tail rotor is geared to the main rotor, so in many helicopters the loss of main rotor RPM also causes a significant loss of tail rotor thrust and a loss of directional control.
