= Browns Bay (Northern Ireland) =

Bay in County Antrim, Northern Ireland

Coordinates: 54.854°N 5.768°W

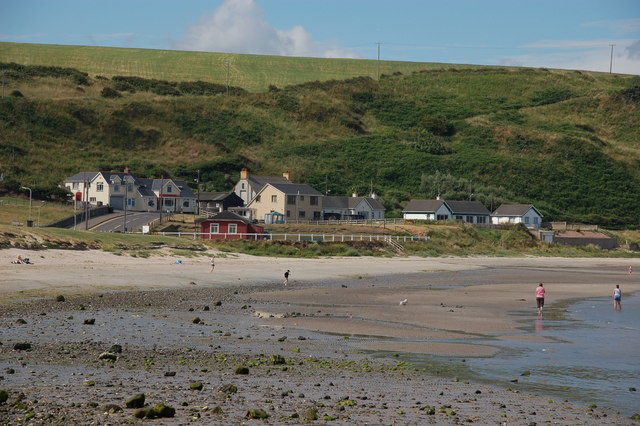
Browns Bay

Browns Bay is a small sandy bay on the northern tip of the Islandmagee peninsula, near Larne in County Antrim, Northern Ireland. The car park has 150 spaces. The caravan park closed in 2014 for operational reasons. A review of the facilities is currently being carried out. Dogs must be on a lead between 11.00 am and 6.00 pm from 1 June -31 August plus all Public and Bank Holidays. A Fixed Penalty of £80 is applicable. Outside these hours and for the rest of year there are no restrictions. However, owners are nevertheless asked to use their own good judgement, for example do not allow dogs loose if there are many people on the beach. Dog foul must never be left anywhere including the less accessible grass or stony areas. Place into the bins provided. A small shop is open part-time hours. Toilets have disabled and baby changing facilities. They are cleaned every day and open all year.
