= Cierva C.1 =

Early autogyro built by Juan de la Cierva

C.1

General information
- Type: experimental autogyro
- Manufacturer: Juan de la Cierva
- Number built: 1

The Cierva C.1 was an experimental autogyro built by Juan de la Cierva in Spain in 1920, the forerunner of his successful series of autogyros. The C.1 was created by taking the fuselage from a Deperdussin fixed-wing aircraft and mounting two rotors shaft above it. This shaft carried two coaxial contra-rotating rotors, and atop it a fin for increased lateral stability. When tested, the C.1 refused to take off, which Cierva attributed to interference between the two sets of rotors leading to each set autorotating at a different speed. He considered the possibility of mechanically linking the rotors, but dismissed the idea on the grounds of weight and complexity, and his subsequent efforts would all feature single main rotors. Despite its failure to fly, the C.1 demonstrated the principle of autorotation in a full-sized aircraft for the first time, as it was taxied around the ground.
