= Alan Marsh =

British test pilot (1901–1950)

- Born: 29 January 1901; Stratton, Dorset
- Died: 13 June 1950 (aged 49); Eastleigh. Hampshire
- Military career
- Allegiance: United Kingdom
- Branch: Royal Air Force
- Service years: 1918–1930, 1939–1946
- Rank: Squadron Leader
- Awards: AFC, AFRAeS

Henry Alan Marsh AFC AFRAeS (29 January 1901 – 13 June 1950) was a British rotorcraft instructor and test pilot.

== Early life ==
Alan Marsh was born in Stratton, Dorset. In 1917, he completed his education at Weymouth Secondary School, and started an engineering apprenticeship in Dorchester, Dorset.

== RAF service 1918–1930 ==
In 1918, he joined the RAF as a 3rd Air Mechanic, and was posted to the first aircraft apprenticeship course at Halton. After being promoted to corporal, he joined the second course of NCO pilots at No. 2 FTS, Duxford. In November 1923, he passed out as a Sergeant Pilot with special distinction, and was posted to No. 41 Squadron. In 1924, he joined No. 1 Squadron, flying Sopwith Snipes in Iraq. In 1926, he was posted to No. 111 Squadron, flying Armstrong-Whitworth Siskins. In 1927 and 1928, he represented No. 111 Squadron in RAF flying displays.

In September 1928, he joined an instructors' course at the Central Flying School (CFS) at RAF Wittering. He passed out from the course with an A.2 certificate, and then became an instructor at No. 2 FTS at RAF Grantham, flying Siskins and Atlases. In May 1929, he was posted to CFS as a Flight Sergeant instructor. In 1930, he left the service with an A.1 instructor's certificate, and was retained in the Royal Air Force Volunteer Reserve (RAFVR).

== Civil aviation 1930–1939 ==
In 1930, he was employed as an instructor at the Hampshire Aero Club, and then briefly as instructor at the Scarborough Aero Club. He had flown a Cierva C.19 autogiro, and in 1932 Reggie Brie invited him to join the Cierva Autogiro Company as an instructor and demonstration pilot. He became Chief Instructor at the Cierva Autogiro Flying School at London Air Park (Hanworth Aerodrome), and instructed over 80 trainee autogiro pilots in Cierva C.19 and Cierva C.30 types. He took part in the development of direct control autogiros, and later, autogiros with "jump start" features. In 1936, after Juan de la Cierva was killed in an airline accident, Marsh took over as Chief Test Pilot for the Cierva company. He also carried out test flying for G and J Weir Ltd., that was providing financial backing for Cierva, and developing its own autogiros. Weir's designer, C. G. Pullin, became chief designer and managing director of Cierva. In 1936, Marsh was commissioned in the RAFVR.

== RAF service 1939–1946 ==
In late 1939, he was called up for military service, and in January 1940 took a refresher course at CFS, and he was then posted to the Royal Aircraft Establishment (RAE). In April, 1941, he took over as Commanding Officer of No. 1448 Flight RAF, that operated Cierva C.30 Rotas on radar calibration duties. In June 1943, that unit was renamed No. 529 Squadron RAF. He stayed in that post until the squadron was disbanded in 1945. He was awarded the AFC, and in early 1946 he retired from the RAF.

== Civil test flying 1946–1950 ==
In 1946, he joined the Cierva Autogiro Company as General Manager and Chief Test Pilot. He carried out first flights and initial development of various autogiros and helicopter types including Weir WE.3, Westland CL.20, Cierva C.40, Cierva W.9, Cierva W.11 Air Horse, Cierva W.14 Skeeter, Bristol 171 Sycamore. By June 1950, he had logged 6,500 flying hours, of which 3,000 were on 70 types of fixed-wing aircraft, and 3,500 on rotorcraft that included 22 types of autogiro and five helicopters. His qualifications included Pilot's A and B licences and 2nd Class Navigators licence, and he held the GAPAN (Guild of Air Pilots and Air Navigators) Master Instructor's Diploma. He was also the rotating-wing representative on the GAPAN Panel of Examiners.

On 13 June 1950, he was piloting the prototype Cierva W.11 Air Horse (VZ724) helicopter, when a transmission failure caused it to crash near Eastleigh, Hampshire, killing all three crew, Alan Marsh, John "Jeep" Cable, and Joseph K. Unsworth.

== Legacy ==
In 1946, Alan Marsh was instrumental in the formation of the Helicopter Association of Great Britain (HAGB), and became its first chairman. In 1956, his friends in the HAGB, headed by Reggie Brie, formed the Alan Marsh Memorial Trust Fund, to support technical training in the rotary wing field, and to award an annual medal for outstanding pilotage achievement in the subject.
