= Reginald Brie =

British rotorcraft test and demonstration pilot

- Born: 27 November 1895; Egham
- Died: 1 February 1989
- Military career
- Allegiance: United Kingdom
- Branch: Royal Air Force
- Service years: 1914–1922, 1939–1945
- Rank: Wing Commander
- Nickname: Reggie
- Awards: MBE, AFRAeS, AFIAeS

Reginald Alfred Charles Brie MBE AFRAeS AFIAeS (27 November 1895 – 1988) was a British rotorcraft test and demonstration pilot.

== Early life ==
Reginald Brie was born in Egham, Surrey. After leaving school, he started an electrical engineering apprenticeship in Southall.

== World War I ==
In 1914, he joined the Royal Field Artillery, and in early 1915 he served in the Somme region. He was then posted to Salonika as an artillery spotter. He was promoted to Sergeant, and sent back to England for officer training. He then transferred to the Royal Flying Corps (RFC), and trained as an observer. He was posted to No. 104 Squadron at RAF Andover. In May 1918, he moved with the squadron to Azelot. On one mission, his Airco DH.9 was attacked by German fighters, and a forced landing was made. He and his pilot were captured, and they served as prisoners of war until December 1918.

== RAF service 1918–1922 ==
In early 1919, he was posted as Transport Officer to No. 2 Group RAF at Oxford. In September 1919, he was granted a short-service commission as a Flying Officer. In December 1919, he was posted to No. 99 Squadron at Risalpur. In 1920, he was posted to the Inspectorate of Recruiting in England. In August 1921, he took a pilot's course at RAF Leuchars, and went solo after 10 hours dual experience. In 1922, he left the RAF, and was retained in the Royal Air Force Volunteer Reserve (RAFVR).

== Shell and RAFVR 1922–1930 ==
In 1922, he was employed in the sales department of Shell Oil Company. He continued to maintain his flying skills as a member of RAFVR, often via the de Havilland School of Flying at Stag Lane Aerodrome. He achieved a pilot's B licence, and became interested in autogiros. He arranged to have a flight with Valentine Baker, who was demonstrating a Cierva C.19 at Heston Aerodrome. Subsequently, he obtained 30 minutes dual instruction with Arthur 'Dizzy' Rawson in a Cierva C.19, and then went solo in it. He then gained his Commercial pilot's licence. As a result of his achievements, Air Commodore J.G. Weir offered him a short-term contract as an autogiro pilot, and he resigned from his job at Shell.

== Cierva autogiros 1930–1939 ==
In November 1930, he was employed by Cierva Autogiro Company as a test pilot to temporarily replace Arthur Rawson, who had been injured in a forced landing. In summer 1931, to promote sales and publicity for Cierva autogiros, he flew a Cierva C.19 Mark III with the flying circus led by C. D. Barnard, and gathered an additional 400 flying hours. In late 1931, he became Chief Pilot and Flying Manager of the Cierva company. In 1932, he helped establish the sales department and the Cierva Autogiro Flying School at London Air Park, Hanworth. When the Avro factory at Hamble was closed, the development activities of the company were also moved to Hanworth. He invited Alan Marsh to be the company Chief Flying Instructor.

Throughout the 1930s, he flew Cierva autogiros in private and public demonstrations in UK and overseas, delivery flights, record attempts, informal competitions against fixed wing aircraft, and in pleasure flights with passengers. In 1933, he was convicted of "low and dangerous flying" in an autogiro over the Kingston Bypass road, adjacent to Hook Aerodrome, Surrey. He became the first pilot to win an appeal against a conviction for a flying offence, and it set a legal precedent allowing low flying near an airfield when there is no danger, irrespective of the alarm displayed by animals or motorists. In 1935, he became the first pilot to land and take off in a rotorcraft from a ship at sea.

== RAF service 1939–1945 ==
In July 1940, he formed No. 1448 Flight RAF and was appointed its commanding officer. Its purpose was to operate Cierva C.30 and Cierva C.40 autogiros on flights from Duxford, to assist calibration of coastal radar installations. In April 1941, he handed over command of the unit to his former civilian colleague Alan Marsh. On 9 April 1941, he was appointed to command the Technical Development Unit at the Central Landing Establishment, based at RAF Ringway, and then assumed the rank of acting Wing Commander. The unit carried out research and development of methods such as landing troops and equipment by parachute or by glider, and notable projects were the Hafner Rotachute and Hafner Rotabuggy. While there, he collaborated with Dr J.A.J. Bennett, designer of the Cierva C.40.

In late 1941, he was sent to the United States to promote the use of autogiros on ships for convoy protection. He advised on the development of the Pitcairn PA-39 autogiro, of which seven had been ordered for the Fleet Air Arm. In May 1942, flying a PA-39, he made the first landings on a British merchant ship. Via the British Air Commission in the US, he promoted the use of helicopters, and he was the only British pilot to fly the prototype of the Sikorsky R-4 helicopter. In 1943, he ran the first helicopter school in America, and in 1944 he conducted the first deck-landing trials with a Sikorsky R-4. In late 1945, he retired from the RAF with the rank of Wing Commander.

== Civil helicopters 1947–1969 ==
In 1947, he returned to the United States on behalf of the Ministry of Civil Aviation, to report on helicopter operations. In July 1947, he was appointed as Officer in Charge of the British European Airways Helicopters (BEAH) Experimental Helicopter Unit. The unit was initially based at Gatwick Airport, then in 1948 it moved to Yeovil, from where regular mail flights were trialled in East Anglia and Dorset. He developed the commercial operations of the unit, and in 1952 set up a permanent base for it at the original site of Gatwick Airport. In 1958, he retired from BEA, and joined Westland Helicopters as Personal Assistant to the Technical Director. In 1959, he was responsible for the planning and commissioning of the Westland-owned Battersea Heliport. In 1969, he retired from Westland. He died in 1988 after a long and busy retirement.

== Legacy and awards ==
Reginald Brie was a founder member of both the Helicopter Association of Great Britain, and the American Helicopter Society. He held both the No. 1 Helicopter Aviator's Certificate and a Commercial Helicopter Pilots Licence. In 1954, the Royal Aeronautical Society awarded him the British Silver Medal for Aeronautics.

== Bibliography ==
- Jenkins, Timothy Neil. July 2013. 'Airborne Warfare: A Technological Perspective'. University of Birmingham.
- LoBao, P. 1985. 'A History of British Airways Helicopters and its predecessors since 1947'. Air-Britain ISBN 0851301290
