= Parnall C.11 =

Experimental autogyro built in the UK in 1928

C.11

General information
- Type: Experimental autogyro
- National origin: UK
- Manufacturer: Parnall
- Designer: Harold Bolas, Juan de la Cierva
- Status: Abandoned project
- Number built: 1

The Parnall C.11, sometimes known as the Cierva C.11 or Parnall Gyroplane was a two-seat experimental autogyro built in the UK in 1928. The aircraft was badly damaged on its first attempted take-off and although repaired, today it is uncertain whether it ever actually flew.

== Design ==
The layout of the C.11 was typical of the tractor-powered autogyros of the era: an aeroplane-like fuselage with a rotor mounted on a mast above it. In this case, the aircraft was also equipped with small, stub wings, which carried large, full-span ailerons. The pilot and a single passenger sat in tandem, open cockpits. It had fixed, tailskid undercarriage, and a conventional tail. Power was provided by a piston engine in the nose powering a tractor-mounted propeller. The rotor blades were braced by telescopic struts and were equipped with drag hinges. Pre-rotation was originally achieved by a rope and pulley.

Like the C.10 built around the same time, the C.11's rotor mast was carried by an unusually complicated six-strut pylon, and two control rods ran between the fuselage and the rotor head. The purpose of these features is unknown today, although the intention might have been to vary the position of the rotor fore-and-aft to test it in different positions, and the control rods might have been part of a mechanism to adjust the tilt of the rotor. The complex rotor support was eventually replaced by a simpler, pyramidal design.

== Development ==
The C.11 was built by Parnall's to an order by the Cierva company. The airframe design was largely the work of Parnall designer Harold Bolas and the rotor components the work of Juan de la Cierva. Construction was completed in November 1927 and it was issued UK civil registration G-EBQG.

== Operational history ==
Juan de la Cierva attempted the first test flight of the aircraft at Yate Aerodrome in February 1928. The C.11 rolled over during taxiing and was severely damaged. The accident investigation concluded that Cierva had attempted take-off before the rotor was sufficiently spun up. Many years later, designer Bolas speculated that the rollover (like the rollovers of the C.10) were caused by ground resonance, an unknown phenomenon at the time.

The C.11 was reconstructed in October, and substantially modified. In this form, it has a smaller main rotor, and the stub wings were moved forward, given more dihedral, and a different bracing strut arrangement. The main undercarriage was also redesigned. The bracing struts on the rotor were replaced by wires. (Note: Although most sources associate these changes with the repairs made after Cierva's accident on his first flight attempt, aviation historian Philip Jarrett points out that no exact chronology of the C.11 has survived, and it is not possible to say with certainty which changes were made at which point in development.) It is possible that the aircraft flew in this configuration.

Another major rebuild took place over a year later. This time, the framework of struts supporting the rotor was replaced with a simpler one, and a rotor pre-rotation mechanism was added, taking power from the engine. This mechanism was reportedly designed by Frank B. Halford and although at 75 pounds (34 kg), too heavy to be practical, similar pre-rotation devices would soon be installed on other autogyros. On 8 January 1930, the pre-rotation mechanism was demonstrated to representatives of the Royal Aircraft Establishment.

It is unknown whether the C.11 flew in this final configuration (or indeed, at all). In 1931, Cierva gave it to Air Service Training at Hamble, where it was used as an instructional airframe. It was struck from the civil register the same year. The last known sighting of the aircraft was at ATS in late July 1934.

== Specifications (approximate) ==
Data from Brooks 1988, p.96

General characteristics

- Crew: 1 pilot
- Capacity: 1 passenger
- Powerplant: 1 × ADC Airdisco liquid-cooled, eight-cylinder Vee engine, 120 hp (89 kW)
- Main rotor diameter: 35 ft 3.25 in (10.7506 m)

== Notes ==
=== Bibliography ===
- Brooks, Peter W. (1988). Cierva Autogiros: The Development of Rotary-Wing Flight. Washington D.C.: Smithsonian Institution.
- The Illustrated Encyclopedia of Aircraft. London: Aerospace Publishing.
- Jarrett, Philip (August 1988). "Parnall's pinwheels". Aeroplane Monthly. Vol. 16, no. 8. Surrey: Prospect Magazines. pp. 474–78.
- Wixey, Kenneth E. (1990). Parnall Aircraft Since 1914. London: Putnam.
- Wixey, Kenneth E. (January–February 2003). "The Bolas Touch". Air Enthusiast. No. 103. Stamford: Air Enthusiast. pp. 10–19.
