= Armstrong Siddeley Genet =

1920s British piston aircraft engine

Genet
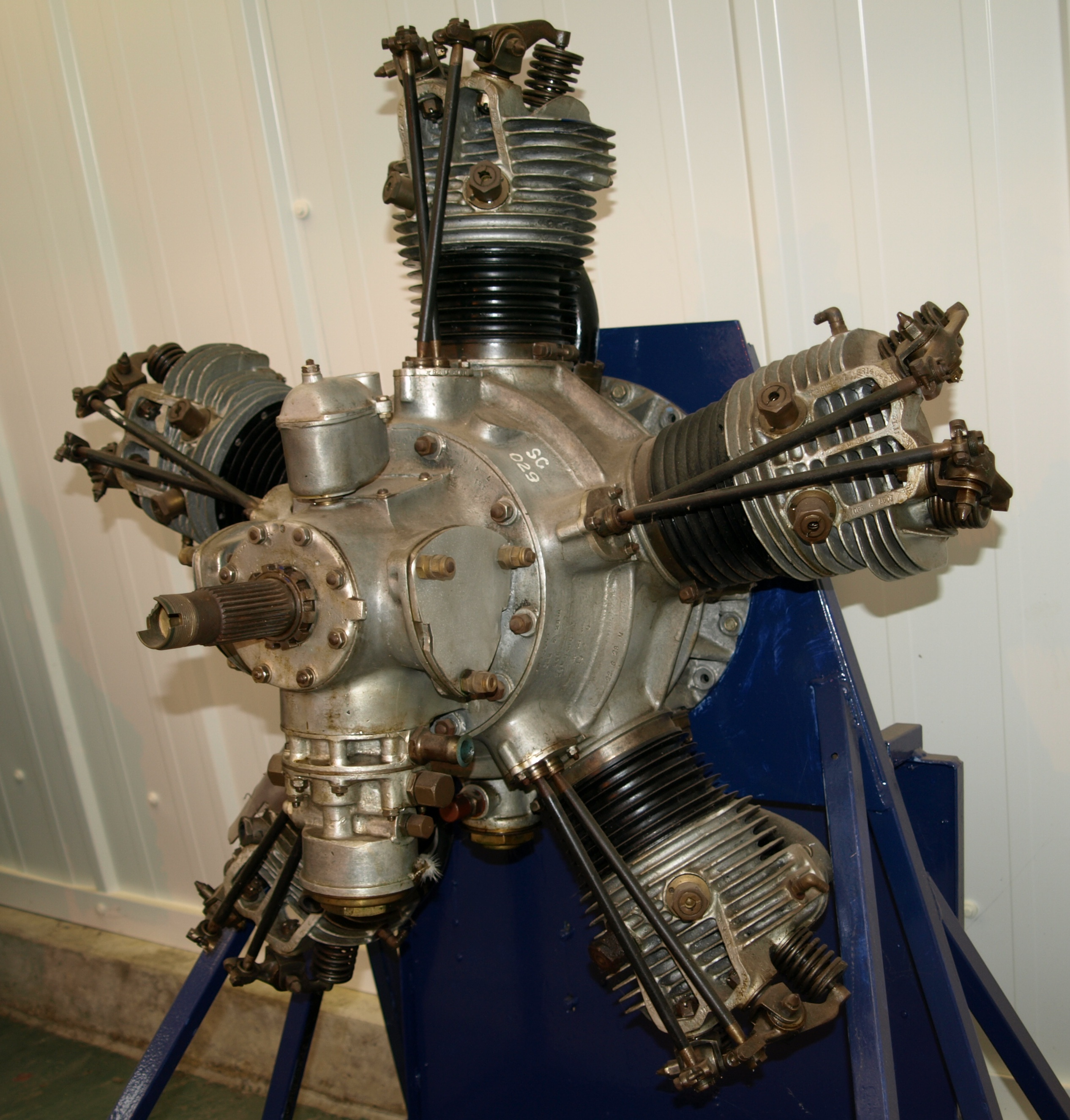
- Preserved Armstrong Siddeley Genet at the Shuttleworth Collection
- Type: Radial engine
- National origin: United Kingdom
- Manufacturer: Armstrong Siddeley
- First run: 1926
- Developed into: Armstrong Siddeley Genet Major

The Armstrong Siddeley Genet is a five-cylinder, air-cooled, radial engine for aircraft use built in the UK, first run in 1926. It developed 80 hp at 2,200 rpm in its final form and was a popular light aircraft powerplant. Following the company tradition with a slight deviation the engine was named after the Genet, a catlike animal of the same order but different family.

== Variants and applications ==
=== Genet I ===
Genet I producing 65 hp.

- Avro 618 Ten
- Avro Avian prototype
- Blackburn Bluebird I
- BFW M.23
- Cierva autogyros. C.9 and C.10
- Drzewiecki JD-2
- Fleet Fawn
- Junkers A50 Junior
- Medwecki and Nowakowski M.N.5
- Saro Cutty Sark
- Southern Martlet
- Westland-Hill Pterodactyl

=== Genet II ===
The Genet II produced 80 hp due to an increased compression ratio of 5.25:1.

- ANEC IV
- Avro Avian
- Blackburn Bluebird II
- Cierva C.19 autogyro
- Darmstadt D-18
- de Havilland DH.60 Moth
- Fairchild 21
- Klemm Kl 25
- Nicholas-Beazley NB-8G
- Parnall Imp
- Robinson Redwing II
- Southern Martlet
- Westland Widgeon

=== Genet IIA ===
Also 80 hp and with minor differences to the Mark I.

- Robinson Redwing II

== Engines on display ==
Two preserved Armstrong Siddeley Genets are on static display at the Shuttleworth Collection, Old Warden, Bedfordshire.

A preserved Genet is on display at the Australian National Aviation Museum, Moorabbin, Victoria, Australia

There is a restored Genet at the New England Air Museum, Bradley Int'l Airport, Windsor Locks, CT.

A Genet is on display at the Aviation Heritage Museum (Western Australia).

== Specifications (Genet I) ==
Data from Lumsden.

=== General characteristics ===
- Type: 5-cylinder single-row radial
- Bore: 4 in (101.6 mm)
- Stroke: 4 in (101.6 mm)
- Displacement: 251.43 cu in (4.1 L)
- Length: 28.5 in (724 mm)
- Diameter: 34 in (863.6 mm)
- Dry weight: 168 lb (76 kg)

=== Components ===
- Valvetrain: Overhead poppet valves
- Cooling system: Air-cooled
- Reduction gear: Direct drive, Left hand tractor

=== Performance ===
- Power output: 65 hp at 1,800 rpm
- Compression ratio: 5.2:1
- Power-to-weight ratio: 0.38 hp/lb

== See also ==
Related development

- Armstrong Siddeley Genet Major

Comparable engines

- BMW X
- Warner Scarab Junior

Related lists

- List of aircraft engines
