= Parnall C.10 =

Experimental autogyro built in the UK in 1927

C.10

General information
- Type: Experimental autogyro
- National origin: UK
- Manufacturer: Parnall
- Designer: Harold Bolas, Juan de la Cierva
- Status: Cancelled project
- Number built: 1

The Parnall C.10, sometimes known as the Cierva C.10 was an experimental autogyro built in the UK in 1927 but abandoned after two crashes during taxiing tests.

== Design ==
The C.10 design was typical for the autogyros of its day: an aeroplane-like fuselage surmounted by a rotor on a mast. It had a conventional tail, fixed, tailskid undercarriage, and a single-seat open cockpit. It had strut-braced, stub wings mounted in a low-wing configuration, most of which consisted of large, full-span ailerons. Power was supplied by a radial engine in the nose, driving a tractor propeller. The powerplant was originally intended to be a Bristol Cherub, but it was built with a Armstrong Siddeley Genet with more than twice the horsepower. The mast supporting the four-blade, cable-braced rotor was unusually complex, a six-strut structure that might have been intended to facilitate relocating the rotor fore-and-aft for testing in different positions. Contemporary photographs show control rods visible between the fuselage and rotor hub, the purpose of which is unknown today.

Although the exact division of the design work is not now known, the airframe was largely the work of Parnall chief designer Harold Bolas, while the rotor and head were by Juan de la Cierva. The structure was a wooden framework, covered in fabric.

== Development ==
Like the C.9, the C.10 was designed to meet Air Ministry Specification 4/26. Starting in 1926, autogyro pioneer Juan de la Cierva had started adding drag hinges to his rotor designs to reduce vibration and wear. However, he still hoped to avoid the extra complexity of these hinges, and used the Air Ministry contract to compare designs with and without them. The C.9, built by Avro, had the hinges, while the C.10, built by Parnall did not.

Construction was complete in January 1927, and it was issued the military serial J9038.

== Operational history ==
The first taxi test of J9038 was on 26 April 1928 at Yate Aerodrome with Avro test pilot Harold A. Hamersley at the controls. While taxiing into the wind with a groundspeed of around 10 miles per hour (16 km/h), the aircraft abruptly rolled over onto its left-hand side. Hamersley was unhurt, but the C.10's rotor, left wing, and left tailplane were damaged.

The subsequent investigation concluded that the rotor mast needed to be offset 5° to the right to offset the gyroscopic effect of the rotor. Based on this, a 4° offset was one of a number of modifications made to the machine, which also included replacing the cable bracing of the rotor with telescoping struts. The undercarriage was also revised to increase its track from 7 feet (2.1 m) to 10 feet (3.0 m) and reduce its bounce, in case oscillation had contributed to the accident.

In this revised form, Cierva test pilot Arthur Rawson made the next taxiing test at Andover Aerodrome on 5 November 1928. During this test, J9038 rolled over again, this time onto its right-hand side. The investigation attributed the accident to incorrect rigging of the rotor, possibly combined with an unusual attitude for taxiing. Rawson had raised the tail and was taxiing only on the mainwheels, while autogyros with conventional undercarriage usually took off from a three-point position. The damaged aircraft was not rebuilt again.

Many years later, designer Bolas expressed the opinion that both accidents had been caused by ground resonance, a phenomenon not understood at the time.

== Specifications (approximate) ==
Data from Brooks 1988, p.96

General characteristics

- Crew: 1 pilot
- Length: 22 ft 8 in (6.91 m)
- Wingspan: 17 ft (5.2 m)
- Max takeoff weight: 1,100 lb (499 kg)
- Powerplant: 1 × Armstrong Siddeley Genet I air-cooled, seven-cylinder radial engine, 70 hp (52 kW)
- Main rotor diameter: 30 ft (9.1 m)

== Notes ==
=== Bibliography ===
- Brooks, Peter W. (1988). Cierva Autogiros: The Development of Rotary-Wing Flight. Washington D.C.: Smithsonian Institution.
- The Illustrated Encyclopedia of Aircraft. London: Aerospace Publishing.
- Jarrett, Philip (August 1988). "Parnall's pinwheels". Aeroplane Monthly. Vol. 16, no. 8. Surrey: Prospect Magazines. pp. 474–78.
- Wixey, Kenneth E. (1990). Parnall Aircraft Since 1914. London: Putnam.
- Wixey, Kenneth E. (January–February 2003). "The Bolas Touch". Air Enthusiast. No. 103. Stamford: Air Enthusiast. pp. 10–19.
