= Cierva C.17 =

British experimental autogyro rotorcraft

C.17
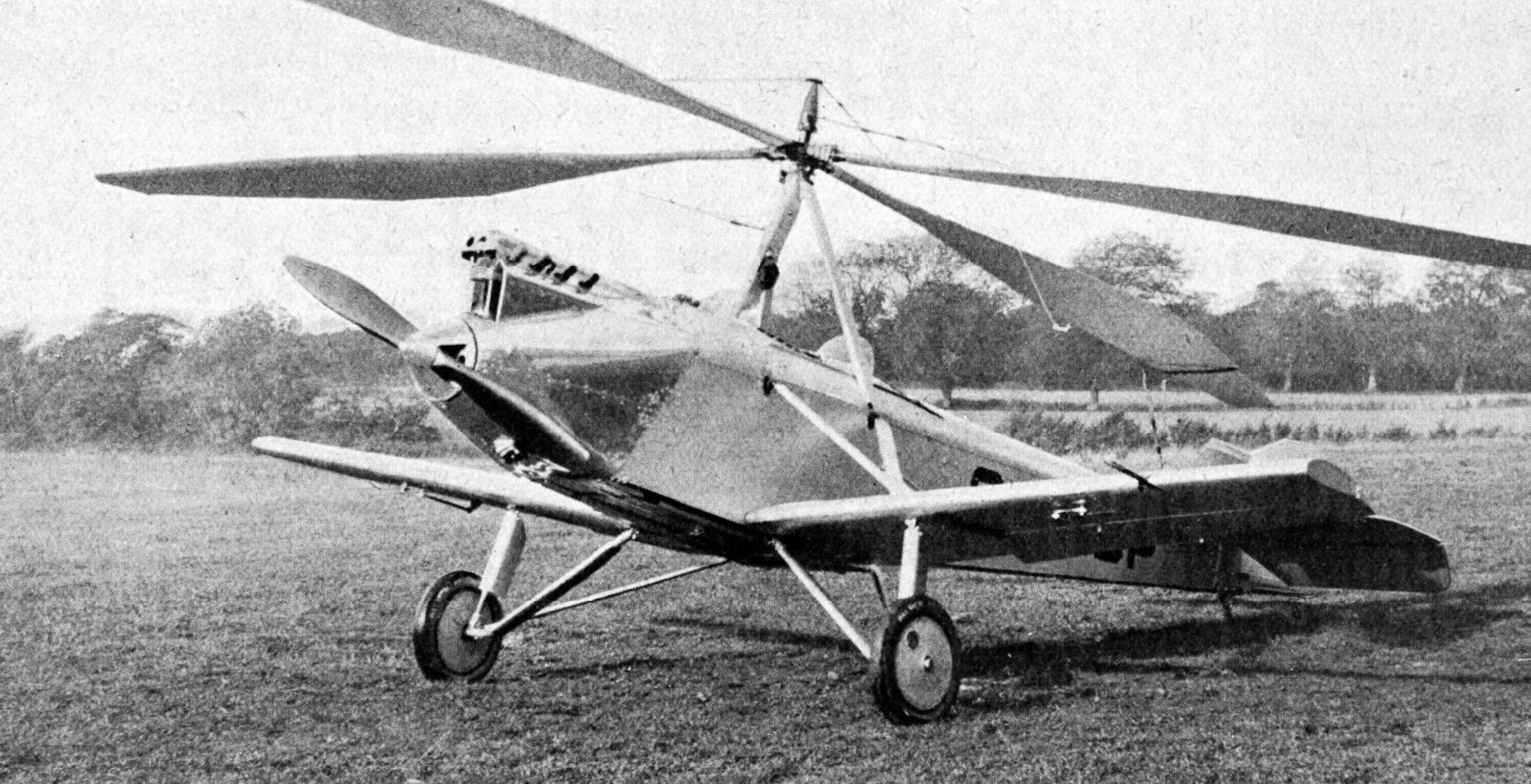

General information
- Type: Experimental autogyro
- National origin: United Kingdom
- Manufacturer: Cierva
- Designer: Juan de la Cierva
- Number built: 2

History
- First flight: 23 October 1928

The Cierva C.17 was a British experimental autogyro built by Cierva Autogiro Company in England in 1928, in association with Avro (which designated it their Type 612). It was an attempt to build upon the successful Cierva C.8 design using the smaller, more streamlined fuselage of an Avro Avian IIIA as a starting point. The type was found to be underpowered, and when the first attempt at fitting a more powerful engine still did not result in acceptable performance, the design was abandoned.

== Variants ==
C.17
Powered by a 67 kW (90 hp) A.D.C. Cirrus III piston engine.
C.17 Mk II
Powered by an Avro Alpha radial piston engine.

== Specifications ==
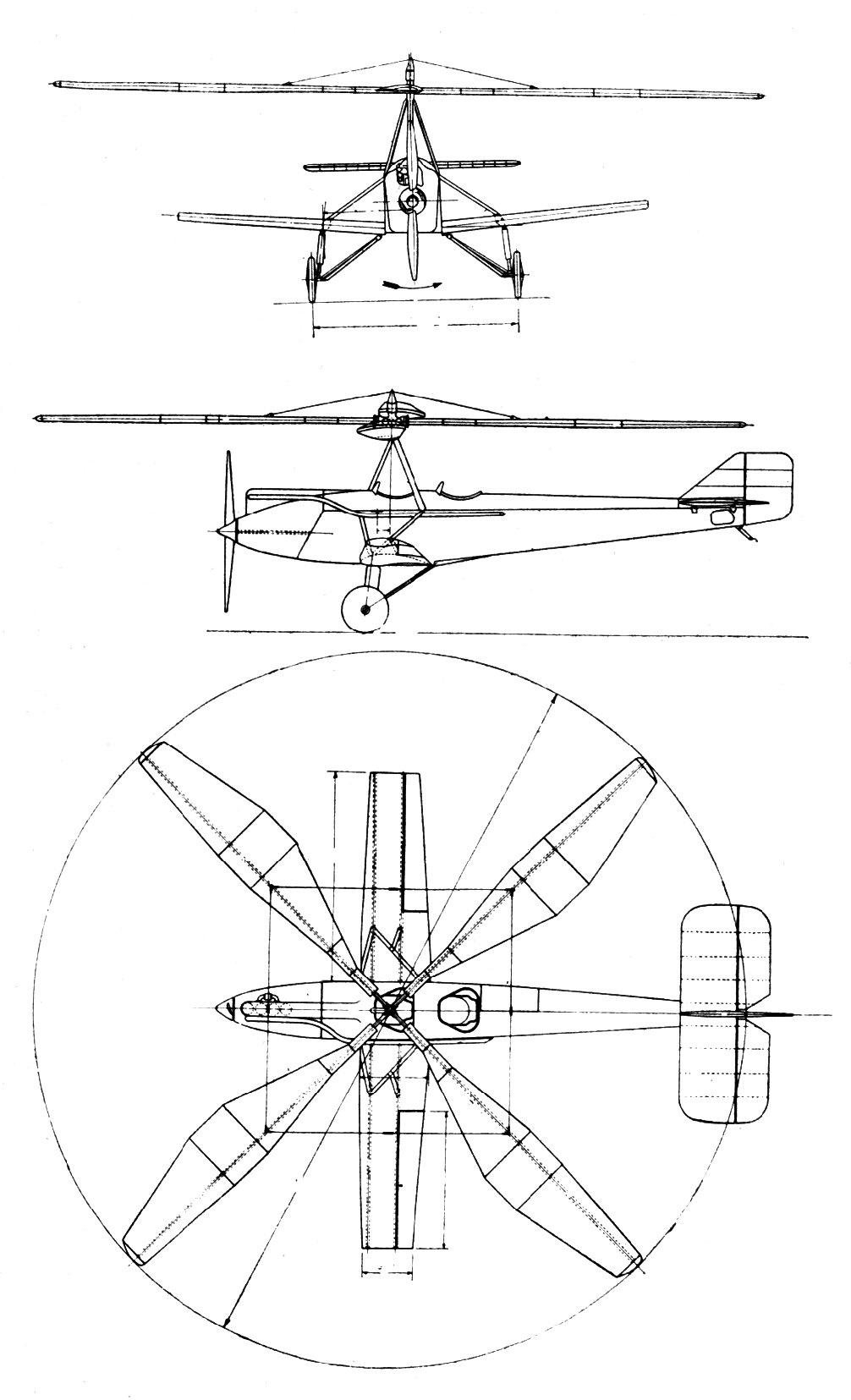
Cierva C.17 3-view drawing from L'Air June 1, 1929

Data from Jane's all the World's Aircraft 1928, British Aircraft Directory

General characteristics

- Crew: 1
- Capacity: 1
- Length: 28 ft 9 in (8.76 m)
- Wingspan: 19 ft 9 in (6.02 m) auxiliary wing
- Height: 11 ft 1 in (3.38 m) tail up
- Empty weight: 970 lb (440 kg)
- Gross weight: 1,455 lb (660 kg)
- Fuel capacity: 17 imp gal (20 US gal; 77 L)
- Powerplant: 1 × ADC Cirrus III 4-cylinder air-cooled in-line piston engine, 90 hp (67 kW)
- Main rotor diameter: 33 ft 3.25 in (10.1410 m)
- Main rotor area: 869 sq ft (80.7 m^{2})
- Propellers: 2-bladed Avro wooden fixed pitch airscrew

Performance

- Maximum speed: 90 mph (140 km/h, 78 kn)
- Minimum speed: 25 mph (22 kn; 40 km/h)
- Range: 210 mi (340 km, 180 nmi) at 70 mph (61 kn; 110 km/h)
- Endurance: 3 hours
- Rate of climb: 500 ft/min (2.5 m/s)
- Power/mass: 18.2 lb/hp (11.13 kg/kW)

== See also ==
Related development

- Avro Avian
- Cierva C.8
