= Juan de la Cierva =

Spanish engineer and count (1895–1936)

The Most Illustrious Juan de la Cierva
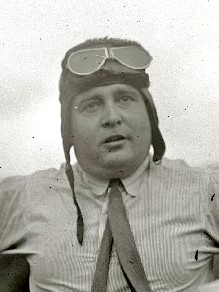
- Juan de la Cierva, inventor of the autogyro at the Lasarte Airfield in 1930
- Born: Juan de la Cierva y Codorníu; 21 September 1895; Murcia, Spain
- Died: 9 December 1936 (aged 41); Croydon, United Kingdom
- Resting place: La Almudena Cemetery, Madrid, Spain
- Education: Escuela Especial de Ingenieros de Caminos, Canales y Puertos
- Occupations: Civil engineer, aviator, inventor
- Known for: Inventor of the autogyro
- Awards: Daniel Guggenheim Medal (1932); Elliott Cresson Medal (1933)

Juan de la Cierva y Codorníu, 1st Count of la Cierva ([ˈxwan de la ˈθjeɾβaj koðoɾˈni.u]; 21 September 1895 – 9 December 1936), was a Spanish civil engineer, pilot and a self-taught aeronautical engineer. His most famous accomplishment was the invention in 1920 of a rotorcraft called Autogiro, a single-rotor type of aircraft that came to be called autogyro in the English language. In 1923, after four years of experimentation, de la Cierva developed the articulated rotor, which resulted in the world's first successful flight of a stable rotary-wing aircraft, with his C.4 prototype.

At the outbreak of the Spanish Civil War, De la Cierva sided with the Nationalist Francoist rebel forces. He used his international connections to help the Nationalist forces acquire arms and other military supplies.

== Early life ==
Juan de la Cierva was born to a wealthy, aristocratic Spanish family, and for a time his father was the war minister. At the age of eight he was spending his pocket money with his friends on experiments with gliders in one of his father's work sheds. In their teens they constructed an aeroplane from the wreckage they had bought from a French aviator who had crashed the plane. The final aeroplane used wood from a Spanish bar counter for the propeller. He eventually earned a civil engineering degree and after building and testing the first successful autogyro, moved to the United Kingdom in 1925, where, with the support of Scottish industrialist James G. Weir, he established the Cierva Autogiro Company.

== Spanish Civil War ==
At the outbreak of the Spanish Civil War, De la Cierva supported the nationalist Francoist rebel forces. He was in contact with various high-ranking military officials, such as general Mola and Francisco Franco himself. He actively helped the rebels by travelling to various European countries to obtain aviation-related supplies, weapons and intelligence. Among them, he obtained the De Havilland DH-89 'Dragon Rapide' which flew Franco from the Canary Islands to Spanish Morocco.

His brother was summarily executed by the Republican army in Paracuellos del Jarama.

== The gyroplane (autogyro) ==
De la Cierva started building aircraft in 1912. In 1914, he designed and built a tri-motor aeroplane which was accepted by the Spanish government. In 1919 he started to consider the use of a rotor to generate lift at low airspeed, and eliminate the risk of stall.

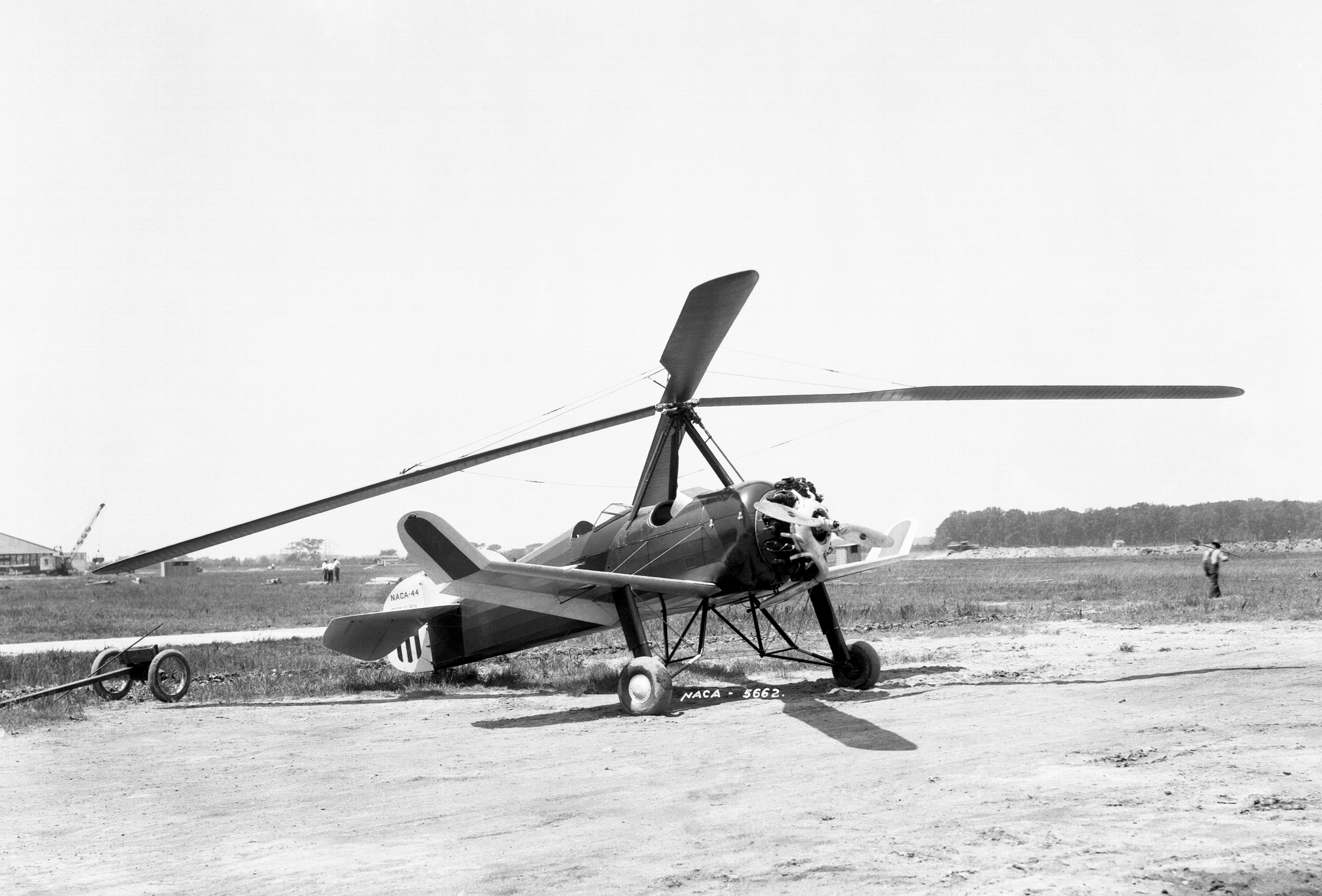
Pitcairn PCA-2 autogyro, built in the US under Cierva license, 1961.

In order to achieve this, he used the ability of a lifting rotor to autorotate, whereby at a suitable pitch setting, a rotor will continue to rotate without mechanical drive, sustained by the torque equilibrium of the lift and drag forces acting on the blades. With De la Cierva's autogyro, the rotor was drawn through the air by means of a conventional propeller, with the result that the rotor generated sufficient lift to sustain level flight, climb and descent.

Before this could be satisfactorily achieved, De la Cierva experienced several failures primarily associated with the unbalanced rolling movement generated when attempting take-off, due to dissymmetry of lift between the advancing and retreating blades. This major difficulty was resolved by the introduction of the flapping hinge. In 1923, De la Cierva's first successful autogyro was flown at Getafe aerodrome in Spain by Lt. Gomez Spencer.

This pioneering work was carried out in De la Cierva's native Spain. In 1925, he brought his C.6 to Britain and demonstrated it to the Air Ministry at Farnborough, Hampshire. This machine had a four blade rotor with flapping hinges but relied upon conventional airplane controls for pitch, roll and yaw. It was based upon an Avro 504K fuselage, initial rotation of the rotor was achieved by the rapid uncoiling of a rope passed around stops on the undersides of the blades.

The Farnborough demonstration was a great success, and resulted in an invitation to continue the work in the UK. As a direct result, and with the assistance of the Scottish industrialist James George Weir, the Cierva Autogiro Company, Ltd., was formed the following year. From the outset De la Cierva concentrated upon the design and the manufacture of rotor systems, relying on other established aircraft manufacturers to produce the airframes, predominantly the A.V. Roe Company.

The Avro built C.8 was a refinement of the C.6, with the more powerful 180hp Lynx radial engine, and several C.8s were built. The C.8R incorporated drag hinges, due to blade flapping motion causing high blade root stresses in the rotor plane of rotation; this modification resulted in other problems such as ground resonance for which drag hinge dampers were fitted.

The resolution of these fundamental rotor problems opened the way to progress, confidence built up rapidly, and after several cross-country flights a C.8L4 was entered for the 1928 Kings Cup Air Race. Although forced to withdraw, the C.8L4 subsequently completed a 4,800 km (3,000 mi) tour of the British Isles. Later that year it flew from London to Paris thus becoming the first rotating wing aircraft to cross the English Channel. The tour was subsequently extended to include Berlin, Brussels and Amsterdam.

A predominant problem with the autogyro was driving the rotor prior to takeoff. Several methods were attempted in addition to the coiled rope system, which could take the rotor speed to 50% of that required, at which point movement along the ground to reach flying speed was necessary, while tilting the rotor to establish autorotation.

Another approach was to tilt the tail stabiliser to deflect engine slipstream up through the rotor. The most acceptable solution was finally achieved with the C.19 Mk.4, which was produced in some quantities; a direct drive from the engine to the rotor was fitted, through which the rotor could be accelerated up to speed. The system was then declutched prior to executing the take-off run.

As De la Cierva's autogyros achieved success and acceptance, others began to follow and with them came further innovation. Most important was the development of direct rotor control through cyclic pitch variation, achieved initially by tilting the rotor hub and subsequently by Raoul Hafner by the application of a spider mechanism that acted directly on each rotor blade. The first production direct control autogyro was the C.30, produced in quantity by Avro, Liore et Olivier, and Focke-Wulf. This machine allowed for change of motion in any direction – upwards, downwards or sideways – by the tilting of the horizontal rotors and also effected a minimising of some of controls used in more conventional aircraft of the period. Development of cyclic pitch variation was also influenced by the Dutch helicopter pioneer Albert Gillis von Baumhauer, who adopted swashplate principle in his designs and probably influenced Cierva in their meeting in 1928.

The introduction of jump take-off was another major improvement in capability. The rotor was accelerated in no-lift pitch until the rotor speed required for flight was achieved, and then declutched. The loss of torque caused the blades to swing forward on angled drag hinges with a resultant increase in collective pitch, causing the aircraft to leap into the air. With all the engine power now applied to the forward thrusting propeller, it was now possible to continue in forward flight with the rotor in autorotation.

The C.40 was the first production jump takeoff autogyro.

Autogyros were built in many countries under De la Cierva licences, including France, Germany, Japan, Russia and the United States.

De la Cierva's motivation was to produce an aircraft that would not stall but near the end of his life he accepted the advantages offered by the helicopter and began the initial work towards that end. In 1936, the Cierva Autogiro Company, Ltd. responded to a British Air Ministry specification for a Royal Navy helicopter with the gyrodyne.

== Death ==
On the morning of 9 December 1936, he boarded a Dutch DC-2 of KLM at Croydon Airfield, bound for Amsterdam. After delay caused by heavy fog, the airliner took off at about 10:30 am but drifted slightly off course after takeoff and exploded after flying into a house on gently rising terrain to the south of the airport, killing 15 people, among them de la Cierva.

== Legacy ==
Juan de la Cierva's work on rotor-wing dynamics made possible the modern helicopter, whose development as a practical means of flight had been prevented by a lack of understanding of these matters. The understanding that he established is applicable to all rotor-winged aircraft; though lacking true vertical flight capability, work on the autogyro forms the basis for helicopter analysis.

De la Cierva's death in an aeroplane crash in December 1936 prevented him from fulfilling his recent decision to build a useful and reliable aircraft capable of true vertical flight for the Royal Navy, but it was his work on the autogyro that was used to achieve this goal. Technology developed for the autogyro was used in the development of the experimental Fw 61 helicopter, which was flown in 1936 by Cierva Autogiro Company licensee Focke-Achgelis. His pioneering work also led to the development of a third type of rotorcraft, the gyrodyne, a concept of his former technical assistant and successor as chief technical officer of the Cierva Autogyro Company, Dr. James Allan Jamieson Bennett.

In 1966, Juan de la Cierva was inducted into the International Aerospace Hall of Fame for his innovation in rotor blade technology, using them to generate lift and to control the aircraft's attitude with precision. The Juan de la Cierva scholarship from the Spanish Ministry of Science is named after him.

== See also ==
- Cierva C.1
- Cierva C.2
- Cierva C.3
- Cierva C.4
- Cierva C.6
- Cierva C.8
- Cierva C.9
- Cierva C.12
- Cierva C.17
- Cierva C.19
- Cierva C.24
- Cierva Air Horse
- Cierva W.9
- Cierva CR Twin

Awards
Preceded by Walther Bauersfeld	Recipient of the Elliott Cresson Medal; 1933	Succeeded by Stuart Ballantine
Spanish nobility
New creation	Count of De La Cierva; 1954	Succeeded by Jaime de la Cierva Gómez-Acebo
