= Cierva W.11 Air Horse =

British prototype helicopter

W.11 Air Horse
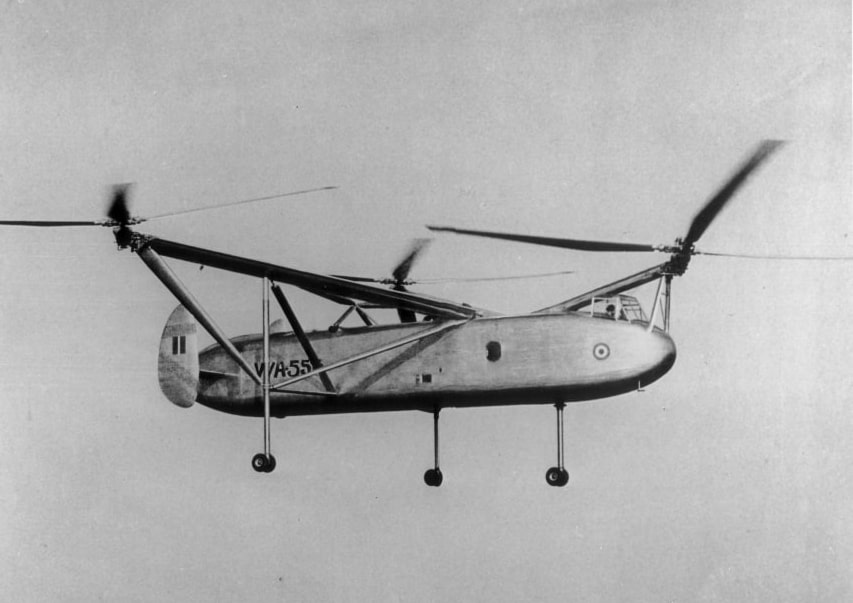
- Cierva W.11 prototype conducts a test flight

General information
- Type: Single-engine three-rotor helicopter
- Manufacturer: Cierva Autogiro Company
- Designer: Cyril Pullin
- Primary user: Ministry of Supply
- Number built: 2

History
- First flight: 7 December 1948
- Retired: 1950
- Developed from: Weir W.6

The Cierva W.11 Air Horse was a helicopter developed by the Cierva Autogiro Company in the United Kingdom during the mid-1940s. The largest helicopter in the world at the time of its debut, the Air Horse was unusual for using three rotors mounted on outriggers, and driven by a single engine mounted inside the fuselage.

Only two aircraft were built, further development by Cierva was stopped after the crash of the first one and little work was done under Saunders Roe before the project was ended and the second aircraft was scrapped in 1951.

== Development ==
The W.11 "Air Horse" heavy lift helicopter was developed by the G & J Weir, Ltd., Aircraft Department, reconstituted in 1943 as the Cierva Autogiro Company. The "W" in the designation is a continuation of the autogiro and helicopter series developed by G & J Weir, Ltd., during the period 1932–1940.

The W.11 was a development of the Weir W.6 dual transverse rotor helicopter. It is the only helicopter of its type ever built and included three lifting rotors all turning in the same direction. The adoption of three rotors was due to concerns over the capability of a single large rotor to generate the required lift.

Torque balance was provided by slightly inclining each rotor axis to generate horizontal thrust components to provide anti-torque moments. The three rotor configuration was foreseen by Belgian helicopter experimenter Nicolas Florine in his patent of 1926 which presented the aforementioned means for balancing the reaction on the fuselage of two or more torque driven lifting rotors turning in the same direction.

Work on the W.11 commenced in 1945. The original W.11 configuration used two rotors transversely mounted either side at the front of the fuselage and a single rotor mounted on the centreline at the tail. This configuration was tested in 1947 with a scale-model in a wind tunnel at the Royal Aircraft Establishment at Farnborough, and much useful data on its performance was acquired. This determined that a single rotor at the front and the pair at the back of the fuselage was preferred for optimum stability and control.

A Rolls-Royce Merlin piston engine in the fuselage drove three 47-foot-diameter (14 m) three-blade rotors mounted on outriggers which projected from the fuselage. The blades were constructed from resin-impregnated wood which provided enormous strength, and were manufactured by the Glasgow furniture firm H. Morris & Co., Ltd. The W.11 rotor control system was hydraulically powered. It was the second helicopter ever to fly using such a system, the first being the Cierva W.9. The landing gear had a stroke of 5 ft (1.5 m) to cater for high descent rates in the event of engine failure during low-altitude operations.

Roles envisaged for the W.11 included passenger transport, air ambulance, and aerial crane. In September 1945 the design was modified to meet a requirement from Pest Control, Ltd., for use as a crop sprayer ("Spraying Mantis") in Africa for the groundnut scheme. Two aircraft were ordered under Air Ministry Specification E.19/46 in July 1946.

Cunliffe-Owen Aircraft, Ltd. at Eastleigh Airport, Southampton, UK, were contracted to build the two W.11s under the direction of the Cierva Autogiro Company. With a payload of 6,720 lb (3,050 kg) it would have been a very capable sprayer and following the first flights in December 1948 a grant was received from the Colonial Office to assist in development. However, the exit of Cunliffe-Owen from the aircraft business in 1947 delayed development of the W.11.

A proposed enlarged development using two Merlins or two Rolls-Royce Dart turboprops was designated as the W.11T. This was abandoned after the accident with the first W.11. The death of three long-time colleagues in the accident prompted financier James G. Weir to decline to provide additional funds since the Cierva Autogiro Company required ever-increasing investment. As a result, all of the company's development contracts were transferred to Saunders Roe. Development of the W.11 continued for a short time thereafter but was terminated by the British Government, and the remaining airframe, which had flown for less than 20 hours in total, was scrapped. Saunders-Roe continued development of the smaller Cierva W.14 Skeeter, which was a main/tail rotor configuration helicopter.

== Operational history ==
W.11 G-ALCV made its first flight on 7 December 1948 and was displayed at the Farnborough Air Show in 1949.

G-ALCV crashed on 13 June 1950, claiming the lives of Sqn Ldr Alan Marsh AFC (chief test pilot), Sqn Ldr John "Jeep" Cable, (Ministry of Supply test pilot), and Joseph K. Unsworth (flight engineer). The cause of the crash was due to fatigue failure of a swashplate carrier driving link in the front rotor hub.

Approximately one year later, the second W.11, G-ALCW was scrapped.

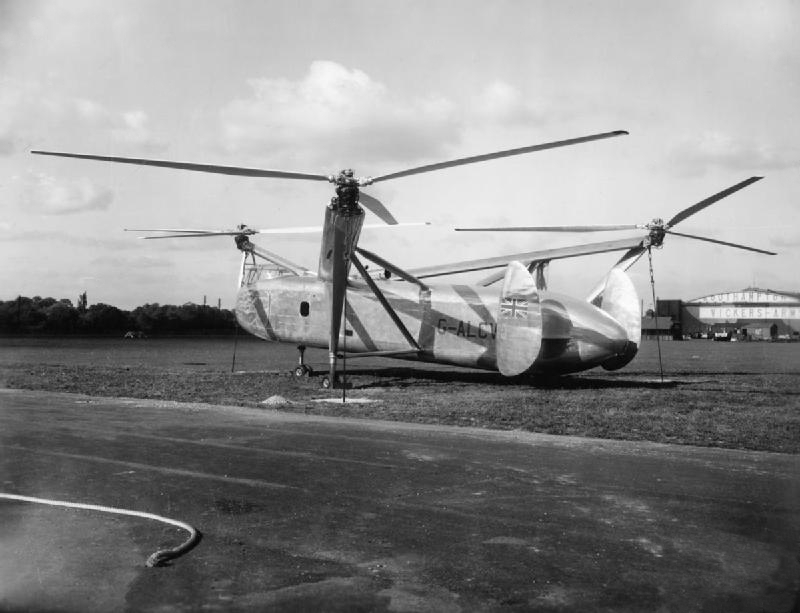
Rear view, the three rotors can be seen

== Variants ==
W.11
Prototype three-rotor helicopter powered by a Rolls-Royce Merlin 24 inline piston engine, two built.
W.11T
Proposal for an enlarged variant powered by two Rolls-Royce Merlin 502 engines, to meet Air Ministry Specification 10/48 for a crop spraying helicopter, requirement was cancelled and the W.11T was not built.
W.12
Proposed freighter variant using Rolls-Royce Dart turboprops, not built

== Specifications (W.11) ==
Data from The Encyclopedia of World Aircraft, Jane's all the World's Aircraft 1949-50, Flight 7 April 1949

General characteristics

- Crew: 3, pilot, co-pilot, flight engineer
- Capacity: cabin capacity 825 cubic feet (23.4 m^{3}) cabin (up to 24 passengers in production version)
- Payload: 3,755 lb (1,703 kg) payload
- Length: 88 ft 7 in (27.00 m)
- Width: 95 ft 0 in (28.96 m) rear rotors tip to tip
- Height: 17 ft 9 in (5.41 m)
- Empty weight: 12,140 lb (5,507 kg)
- Max takeoff weight: 17,500 lb (7,938 kg)
- Fuel capacity: 157 imp gal (189 US gal; 710 L) in a fuselage fuel tank; oil tank 15 imp gal (18 US gal; 68 L)
- Powerplant: 1 × Rolls-Royce Merlin 24 V-12 liquid cooled piston engine, 1,620 hp (1,210 kW)
- Main rotor diameter: 3 × 47 ft (14 m)
- Main rotor area: 5,205 sq ft (483.6 m^{2})

Performance

- Maximum speed: 140 mph (230 km/h, 120 kn) at sea level
- Cruise speed: 95 mph (153 km/h, 83 kn) best range
- Cruise speed best endurance: 55 mph (48 kn; 89 km/h)
- Cruise speed maximum: 116 mph (101 kn; 187 km/h)
- Range: 330 mi (530 km, 290 nmi) in still air
- Endurance: 4.3 hours
- Service ceiling: 23,300 ft (7,100 m) service
- Absolute ceiling 28,000 ft (8,500 m)
- Hover ceiling: 5,000 ft (1,500 m)
- Rate of climb: 790 ft/min (4.0 m/s) initial vertical
- Rate of climb initial inclined: 1,210 ft/min (6.1 m/s)
- Disk loading: 3.36 lb/sq ft (16.4 kg/m^{2})
- Power/mass: 10.8 lb/hp (6.6 kg/kW)
