= Cierva Autogiro Company =

British aviation firm

Cierva Autogiro Company, Ltd
- Company type: Limited company
- Industry: Aviation
- Founded: 24 March 1926
- Founder: James George Weir
- Defunct: 1975
- Headquarters: Hamble, Southampton (from 1946)
- Key people: Juan de la Cierva

The Cierva Autogiro Company was a British firm established in 1926 to develop the autogyro. The company was set up to further the designs of Juan de la Cierva, a Spanish engineer and pilot, with the financial backing of James George Weir, a Scottish industrialist and aviator.

== History ==
Juan de la Cierva's first British-built autogyro was the C.8 design. It and some other designs were built in conjunction with Avro. The pre-war Cierva C.30 proved popular. Nearly 150 were built under licence in the United Kingdom by Avro, in Germany by Focke-Wulf, and in France by Lioré-et-Olivier.

On 9 December 1936, Cierva was killed in the Croydon KLM airliner accident when the aircraft in which he was a passenger crashed after taking off in fog. Dr. James Allan Jamieson Bennett was promoted to Chief Technical Officer of the company and remained in the position until leaving in 1939. In addition to making important contributions to autogyro controls while at Cierva Autogyro, Bennett carried through with Cierva's decision to offer the Royal Navy an aircraft capable of true vertical flight. Bennett's innovative design, a new type of rotorcraft that combined key features of the autogyro and helicopter, was tendered to the Air Ministry (Specification S.22/38) as the Cierva C.41 Gyrodyne, but preliminary work was abandoned with the outbreak of World War II. Bennett joined Fairey Aviation in 1945, where he continued the development of the C.41 design to create the first gyrodyne, the Fairey FB-1, that first flew in 1947.

In 1943, the Aircraft Department of G & J Weir Ltd. was reconstituted as the Cierva Autogiro Company to develop helicopter designs for the Air Ministry. The post-war Cierva Air Horse was at the time (1948) the world's largest helicopter. The first prototype of the Air Horse crashed killing Alan Marsh, Cierva's manager and chief test pilot (Note: Marsh had been with Cierva since 1932 and had been its instructor at the autogyro flying school. During World War II he had flown autogyros for radar development) John "Jeep" Cable, (Note: Cable had learnt to fly under Marsh and had been a Cierva employee before world War II. During World War II, he had been commanding officer of the Research, Development and Training Unit for Rotary-Wing Aircraft.) Ministry of Supply Chief Helicopter Test Pilot, and J. K. Unsworth the Flight Engineer. This led Weir to cease further investment in the company and its development contracts were transferred to Saunders-Roe.

== Aircraft ==
- Cierva C.1
- Cierva C.2
- Cierva C.3
- Cierva C.4
- Cierva C.5
- Cierva C.6
- Cierva C.7

=== British-built aircraft ===
- Cierva C.8
- Cierva C.9
- Cierva C.10
- Cierva C.12 (first flight 1929) - first autogyro with floats
- Cierva C.13 - flying boat autogiro (project only)
- Cierva C.14
- Cierva C.17
- Cierva C.19
- Cierva C.20 Focke-Wulf licence-built version of C.19
- Cierva C.21 Lioré et Olivier licence-built version of C.19 (not built)
- Cierva C.24
- Cierva C.25
- Cierva C.26 - twin-engine autogiro (project only); designation re-used for modified C.24
- Cierva C.29
- Cierva C.30
- Cierva C.32 - two-seat coupe autogiro (project only)
- Cierva C.33 - four seat autogiro based on the Avro Type 641 Commodore (project only)
- Cierva C.37 - twin engine, twin boom autogiro with 45-foot diameter rotor (project only)
- Cierva C.38
- Cierva C.39 - two or three fleet spotter autogiro (project only)
- Cierva C.40
- Weir W.1 - W.4 - Four prototypes of single-place autogiro. Abandoned when development of W.5 helicopter commenced.
- Weir W.5 (first flight 1938) - 2-seater twin (outrigger) rotor helicopter with wooden frame; engine was a 50 hp 4-cylinder air-cooled Weir
- Weir W.6 (first flight 1939) - twin rotor helicopter, 200 hp de Havilland Gipsy, metal tube frame
- Cierva W.9 (first flight 1945) - experimental helicopter to E.16/43, used shaft-driven hydraulically actuated tilting hub for rotor control, and blown air for torque control and direction, one built
- Cierva W.11 Air Horse (first flight 1948) - heavy lift helicopter development of W.6 design, two built
- Cierva W.14 Skeeter (first flight 1948) - from 1951 the Saunders-Roe Skeeter
- Cierva CR Twin (first flight 1969)

== Notes and references ==
Notes

Citations

Bibliography

- CIERVA AUTOGIRO Co., Ltd Flight DECEMBER 9, 1926 p810
