= Cierva C.12 =

C.12
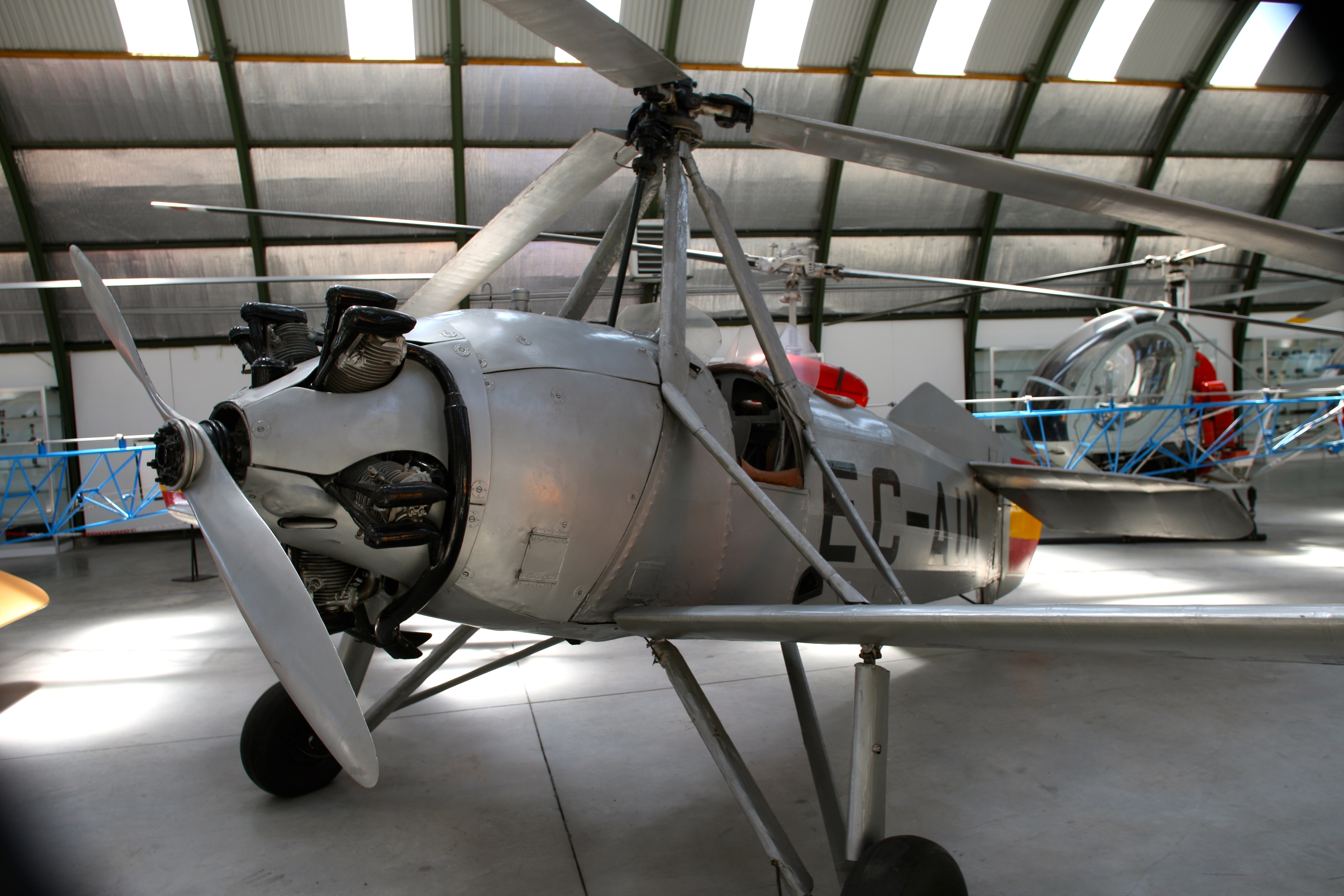
- A similar, later, autogyro, the Cierva C.19 Mk.4, Museo del Aire, Madrid: NB the C.12 appears to have had a 4-bladed main rotor

General information
- Type: Experimental autogyro
- Manufacturer: Cierva Autogiro Company/Avro
- Designer: Juan de la Cierva
- Number built: 1

History
- First flight: 1929

The Cierva C.12 was an experimental autogyro built by Cierva Autogiro Company in England in 1929, in association with Avro.

== Development ==
Like most other Cierva designs, it was based on an existing aircraft fuselage - in this case, an Avro Avian.

== Operational history ==
The most significant thing about this aircraft is that after initial tests, the Avian's second cockpit was removed, and the aircraft's undercarriage was replaced by the same floats used to equip standard Avian seaplanes. In this configuration, the C.12 (now dubbed the Hydrogiro) flew from Southampton Water in April 1930, becoming the first rotary-wing aircraft to take off from water.

== See also ==
- Talleres Loring
