= Cierva C.8 =

C.8
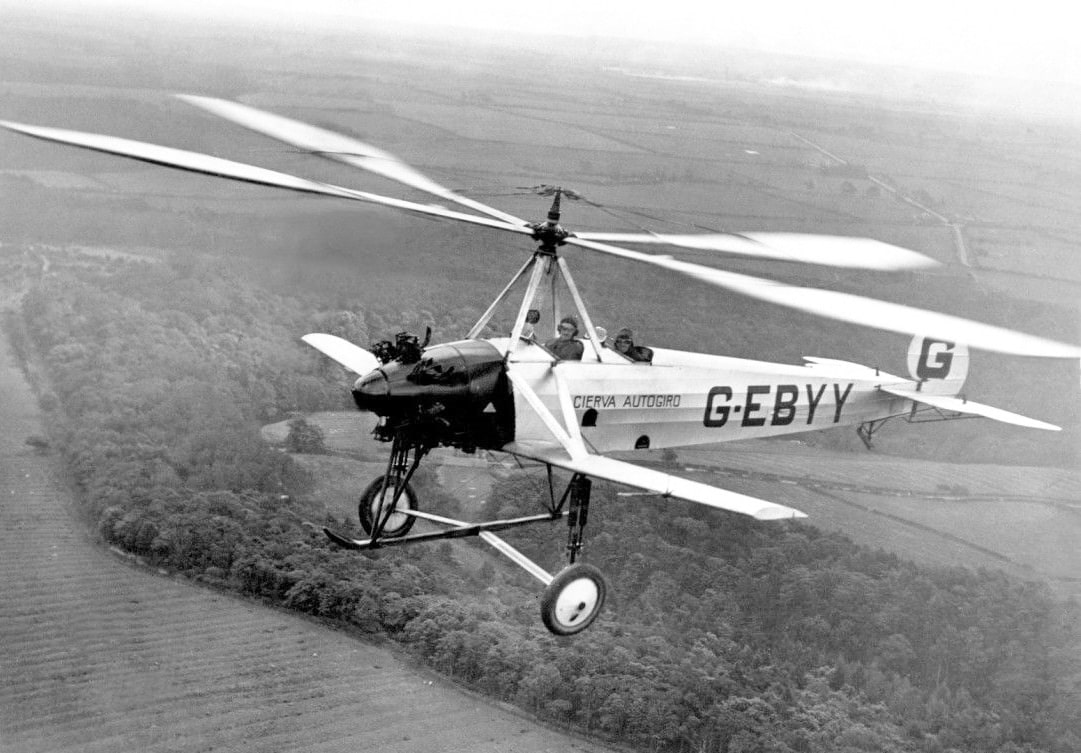
- The Cierva C.8 in flight

General information
- Type: experimental autogyro
- Manufacturer: Cierva
- Designer: Juan de la Cierva
- Number built: 6

History
- First flight: 1926

The Cierva C.8 is an experimental autogyro built by Juan de la Cierva in England in 1926 in association with Avro. Like Cierva's earlier autogyros, the C.8s were based on existing fixed-wing aircraft fuselages – in this case, the Avro 552.

== Design and development ==
The first example, the C.8R (known to Avro as the Type 587) was a rebuild of the C.6D, fitted with stub wings and paddle-shaped main rotor blades. This was followed by the new-built C.8V (or Type 586) that was eventually converted back into an Avro 552 after testing. The next model was the definitive C.8L prototype (or Type 575). The Mark II was based on the Lynx-engined Avro 504N two-seat trainer.

By now, Cierva's efforts were attracting the attention of buyers. The first customer was the British Air Ministry, which placed an order for a machine in 1927. This was completed as the Type 611, test flown by Bert Hinkler at Hamble and then delivered to the Royal Aircraft Establishment by Cierva himself in Britain's first cross-country rotorcraft flight on 30 September that year. The next example was purchased by Air Commodore James G. Weir, chairman of Cierva, and flown in the 1928 King's Cup Air Race before being used to make demonstration flights around continental Europe.

The two final C.8s were sold in 1928, one to the Italian government, and one to American Harold Pitcairn, who would go on to purchase manufacturing rights for the United States. The C.8W bought by Pitcairn would make the first autogyro flight in the United States at Willow Grove, Pennsylvania, on 18 December 1928. The C.8W is the oldest autogyro in the United States.

As of 2007, two examples are extant: Weir's machine preserved at the Musée de l'Air et de l'Espace in Paris, and Pitcairn's at the National Air and Space Museum in Washington, DC.

== Variants ==
C.8R
C.6D fitted with new wings and rotor blades, powered by a 97-kW (130-hp) Clerget engine. (1 converted)
C.8V
Two-seat model, powered by a 134-kW (180-hp) Wolseley Viper piston engine.

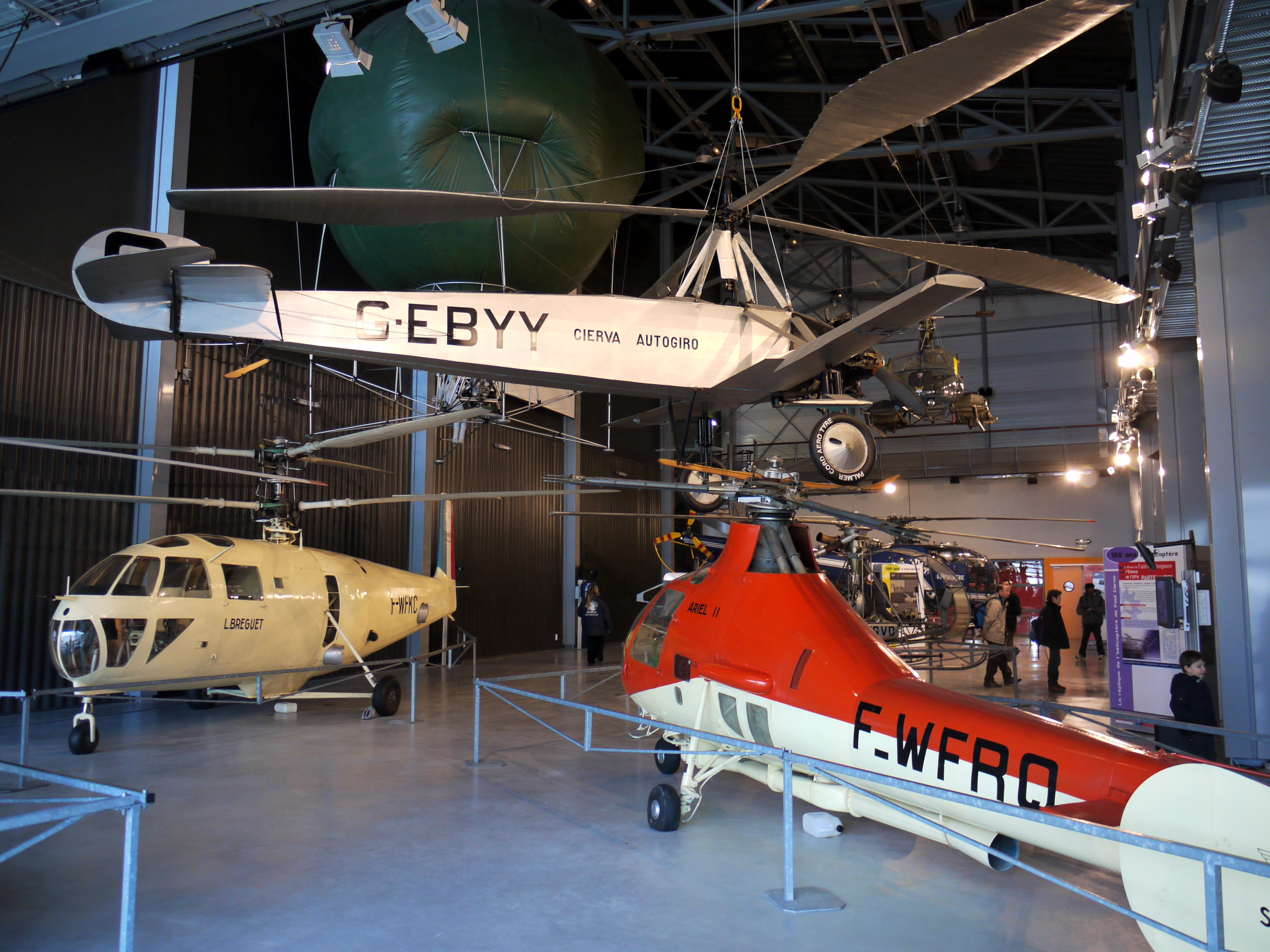
The C.8 on display at the French Air and Space Museum

C.8L
(4 built)
C.8L Mk II
Fitted with short-span wings, powered by an Armstrong Siddeley Lynx IV radial piston engine. The aircraft took part in 1928 King's Cup Air Race. Built in the United Kingdom as the Avro Type 617. (1 built)
Weymann-Lepère C.18
Version of C.8L Mk II built under license in France.
C.8L Mk III
Two aircraft built for the Italian government in 1928.
C.8W
Powered by a 168-kW (225-hp) Wright Whirlwind radial piston engine. This version was built for Harold Frederick Pitcairn. Original designation C.8L Mk IV. (1 built)

== Specifications (C.8 Mark II) ==
Data from Jane's all the World's Aircraft 1928, Flight 5 July 1928 p. 543

General characteristics

- Crew: 1
- Capacity: 1 plus 50 lb (23 kg)
- Length: 36 ft (11 m)
- Wingspan: 23 ft 2 in (7.06 m)
- Height: 14 ft 9 in (4.50 m)
- Empty weight: 1,735 lb (787 kg)
- Gross weight: 2,380 lb (1,080 kg)
- Fuel capacity: 24 imp gal (29 US gal; 110 L)
- Powerplant: 1 × Armstrong Siddeley Lynx IV 7-cylinder air-cooled radial piston engine, 200 hp (150 kW)
- Main rotor diameter: 39 ft 8 in (12.09 m)
- Main rotor area: 1,236 sq ft (114.8 m^{2})
- Propellers: 2-bladed wooden fixed pitch propeller

Performance

- Maximum speed: 100 mph (160 km/h, 87 kn)
- Cruise speed: 85 mph (137 km/h, 74 kn)
- Minimum control speed: 25 mph (40 km/h, 22 kn)
- Endurance: 3 hours at cruising speed
- Rate of climb: 500 ft/min (2.5 m/s)
- Power/mass: 11.9 lb/hp (7.24 kg/kW)
