= Robinson Redwing =

Redwing
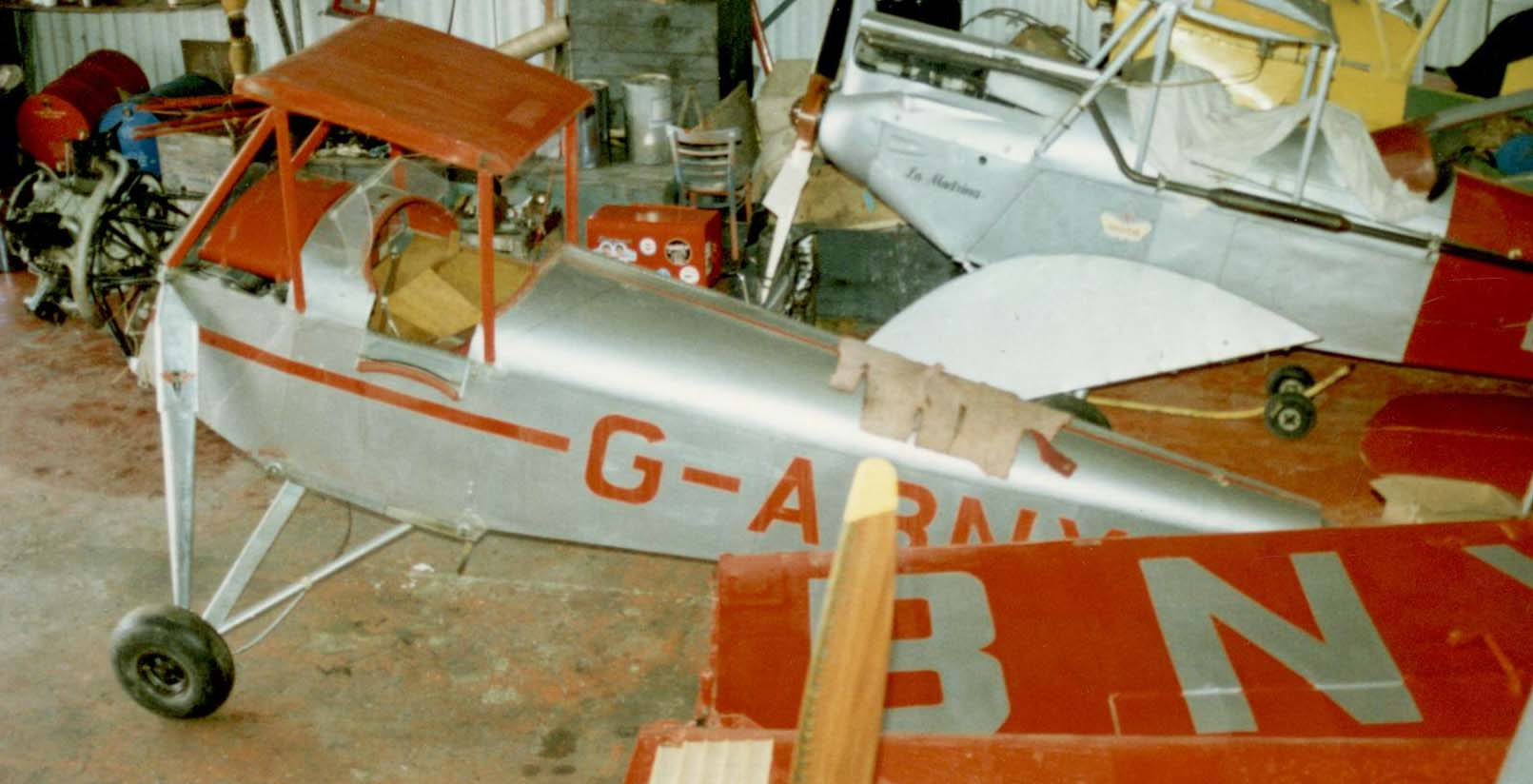
- The sole surviving Redwing 2 under overhaul at Shoreham Airport, Sussex, in 1988. Fuselage centre, wings lower.

General information
- Type: Two seat light aircraft
- National origin: United Kingdom
- Manufacturer: Robinson Aircraft Co. Ltd (later Redwing Aircraft Ltd)
- Designer: John Kenworthy
- Number built: 12

History
- First flight: May 1930

The Robinson Redwing was a British two-seat single-engined biplane light aircraft built in the UK in 1930. Twelve were produced, selling mostly to Clubs; one aircraft survives.

== Design and development ==
First flown in May 1930, the Robinson Redwing appeared at the peak of the boom in light aircraft enthusiasm in the UK. It was a single bay biplane with simple, parallel pairs of interplane struts. With only slight stagger, the wings were easy to fold. They had equal span and chord and were unswept, with straight and parallel edges apart from rounded tips and a wide cut-out at the centre of the trailing edge for pilot visibility. The fuselage was rectangular in cross section, tapering rearwards and with a rounded decking. It was plywood covered and carried a conventional tail with a broad chord fin and balanced rudder. The tailplane was fixed to the top of the fuselage and the elevators were divided to allow rudder movement. Pilot and passenger sat side by side under the upper wing. Ahead of them the fuselage tapered to the engine mounting. The wide track undercarriage was of split axle type, with main legs sloping forward from the wheels to the upper fuselage longerons and with a pair of bracing struts rearwards to the keel. The undercarriage was completed with a tailskid.

The first prototype, later known as the Redwing I flew under the power of a 75 hp (56 kW) A.B.C. Hornet flat four air-cooled engine, but trials during the summer of 1930 suggested a different powerplant. As a result, the second Redwing flew with an 80 hp (60 kW) Armstrong Siddeley Genet IIA five cylinder radial, becoming known as the Redwing II. The next eight aircraft were also built as Redwing IIs, but the last two produced began as Redwing IIIs. These had wings of smaller span – 24 ft 0 in (7.32 m) in compared with 30 ft 6 in (9.30 m)) – and much reduced wing area (154 sq ft (14.3 m^{2}) compared with 250 sq ft (23.2 m^{2})) and wheel fairings, both modifications aimed at improved cross-country performance. The first of these was delivered in May 1933 but failed to get a Certificate of Airworthiness until refitted with full area wings in 1934; the second was returned to Redwing II standard before its sale.

== Operational history ==
Most of the twelve Redwings built, including the two prototypes, went to aeroclubs. Six, for example went to the Eastern Counties Aeroplane Club. One of these, G-ABMJ was previously owned by, amongst others the comedian Will Hay. Eventually this machine was sold in Ireland and another in New Zealand. One of the principal problems encountered in club use was a tendency for the main undercarriage leg to break at the junction with the upper longeron. Spares became scarce, cannibalism broke out and the last club machine crashed in the autumn of 1935.

The Redwing that travelled furthest was the ex-Mk III, G-ABRL which left Croydon, flown by Mrs Keith Miller, set for Cape Town. She crossed the Sahara after 21 days, reaching Gao in Mali on 24 January 1935. A few days later the aircraft had to make a forced landing and was wrecked on hitting a tree near Kotonu in Benin.

The last surviving Redwing is G-ABNX. From sometime around the start of World War II it was mostly in store, with only a brief outing in 1951; it was flying in the 1980s and was used in the 1980 children's serial Brendon Chase, episode 3. This TV series was never sold in VHS or DVD format but it can be found on YouTube. It was visible on the ground at Croydon airport in the Agatha Christie film Death in the Clouds, first aired in January 1992. The aircraft had a permit to fly, which expired in May 2003. In 2006 it was at Redhill Aerodrome in non-flying condition.

After being owned by a consortium of owners during the 2000s it was recently purchased by the grandson of the original NZ importer, who is currently having it restored at Durley, near Southampton.

== Airport bases ==
In 1930 the Robinson Redwing aircraft were built at the Robinson Aircraft company based in Croydon. In 1931, the company was reconstituted & became known as the Redwing Aircraft Co Ltd. In 1932, the designer & founder of the company John Kenworthy was appointed to the board and Redwing Aircraft Co moved the whole fleet of 12 aircraft to Gatwick. The aerodrome was also purchased & used as a new flying base. However, in 1934 Redwing Aircraft Co. moved back to Croydon aerodrome.

== Variants ==
- Redwing I -- prototype Hornet engine
- Redwing II -- production Genet engine
- Redwing III --- unsuccessful, with small wing, faired undercarriage

== Specifications (Redwing II) ==
Data from Jackson 1960, p. 219

General characteristics

- Crew: 1
- Capacity: 1
- Length: 22 ft 8 in (6.91 m)
- Wingspan: 30 ft 6 in (9.30 m)
- Height: 8 ft 7 in (2.62 m)
- Wing area: 250 sq ft (23.2 m^{2})
- Empty weight: 870 lb (395 kg)
- Gross weight: 1,450 lb (658 kg)
- Powerplant: 1 × Armstrong Siddeley Genet IIA 5-cylinder radial , 80 hp (60 kW)

Performance

- Maximum speed: 95 mph (153 km/h, 83 kn)
- Cruise speed: 85 mph (137 km/h, 74 kn)
- Range: 275 mi (442 km, 239 nmi)
- Rate of climb: 800 ft/min (4.06 m/s)
