= Cierva CR Twin =

CR Twin
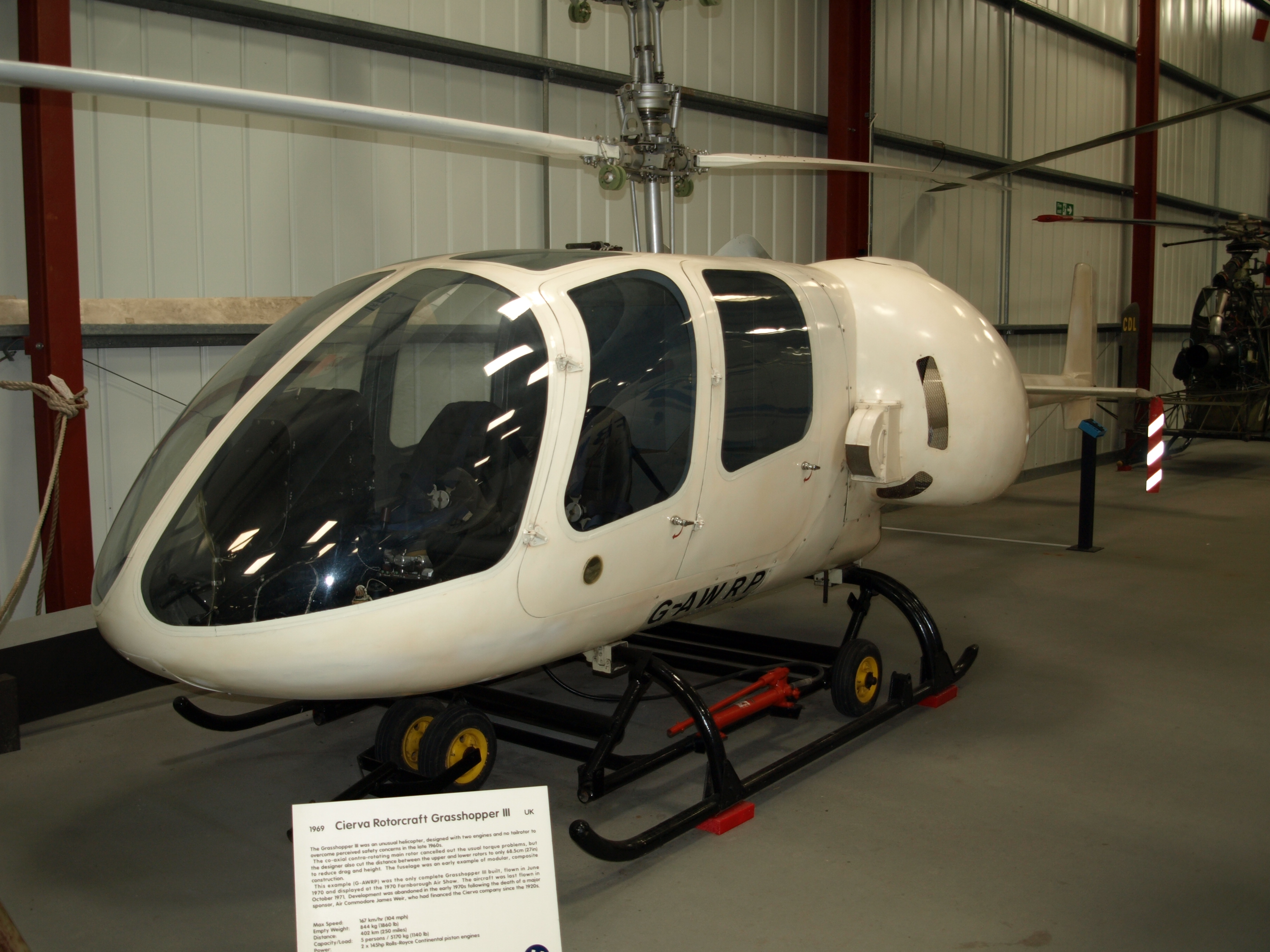
- Cierva Grasshopper III on display at the Helicopter Museum (Weston).

General information
- Type: Utility helicopter
- Manufacturer: Cierva Autogiro Company / Rotorcraft Ltd
- Designer: J S Shapiro
- Number built: 3

History
- First flight: 18 August 1969

The Cierva CR Twin (originally designated CR LTH.1 and also known as the Grasshopper III) was a five-seat utility helicopter that first flew in the UK in 1969. It was a joint development between Cierva Autogiro Company and Rotorcraft now a subsidiary of Cierva, based on the dynamic systems of the latter company's Grasshopper design. A new, highly streamlined pod-and-boom fuselage was married to the Grasshopper's coaxial rotor system, and the new aircraft registered G-AWRP first flew on 18 August 1969.

Two further prototypes followed, G-AXFM later in 1969 and G-AZAU in 1971, this latter example fitted with 210 hp Continental IO-360-D engines in place of the Rolls-Royce Continental O-300 units of the first two machines. Financial backing could not be obtained for further development, and the project was abandoned by 1975. The first prototype is preserved at The Helicopter Museum in Weston-super-Mare.

== Variants ==
- CR Twin - prototypes (3 built)
- CR.420 - proposed production variant with 210 hp Continental TSIO-360-A engines (not built)
- CR.640 - proposed production variant with 320 hp Continental Tiara T6-320 engines (not built)

== Specifications ==
Data from Jane's All The World's Aircraft 1971-72

General characteristics

- Crew: One pilot
- Capacity: 4 passengers
- Length: 28 ft 2 in (8.58 m)
- Height: 9 ft 11 in (3.02 m)
- Empty weight: 1,935 lb (878 kg)
- Gross weight: 3,150 lb (1,439 kg)
- Powerplant: 2 × Continental IO-360 , 135 hp (101 kW) each
- Main rotor diameter: 2 × 33 ft 0 in (10.06 m)
- Main rotor area: 804 sq ft (74.7 m^{2})

Performance

- Maximum speed: 130 mph (209 km/h, 110 kn)
- Cruise speed: 120 mph (193 km/h, 100 kn)
- Range: 500 mi (804 km, 430 nmi)
- Service ceiling: 20,000 ft (6,100 m)
- Rate of climb: 1,400 ft/min (7.1 m/s)
