= Cierva C.19 =

British two-seat autogyro aircraft

C.19
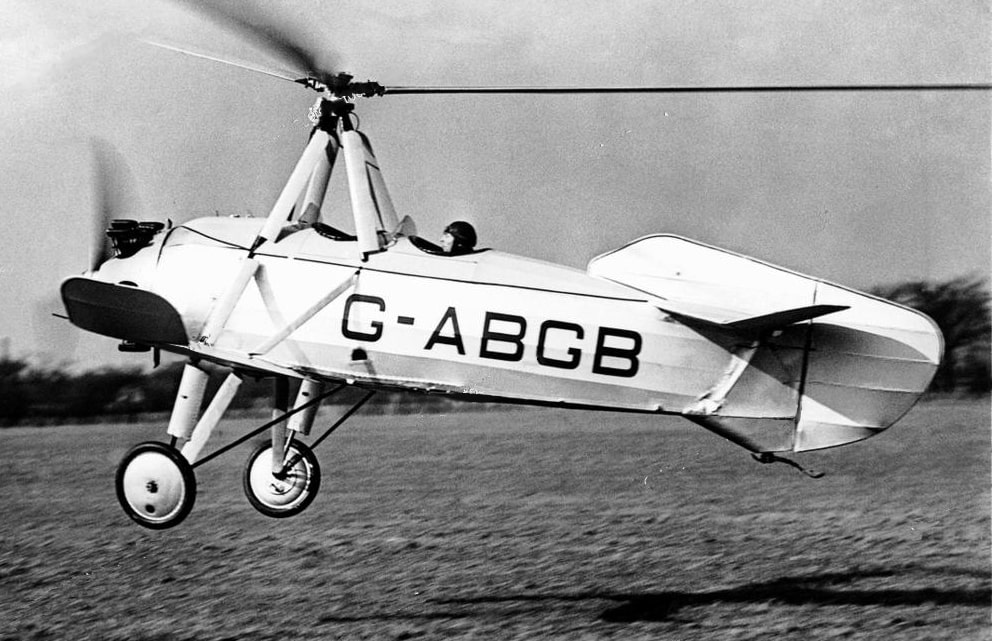
- Cierva C.19 landing

General information
- Type: Utility autogyro
- Manufacturer: Cierva
- Designer: Juan de la Cierva
- Number built: >30

History
- First flight: 1929

The Cierva C.19 was a 1930s British two-seat autogyro, designed by Spanish engineer Juan de la Cierva. It was built by Avro as the Avro Type 620. It proved to be the most successful and widely produced of the early de la Cierva designs.

== Development ==
De la Cierva's first successful autogyro, the Cierva C.6, used an Avro 504 fuselage, and this led to a long and close collaboration between de la Cierva and Avro from 1926 onwards, with de la Cierva providing the rotor design, and Avro the airframe from designs that often appeared as both fixed-wing and rotary aircraft. There was a long series of such autogyros, developing the rotary wing concept. However the 1929 C.19^{,} was a de la Cierva design, owing nothing to existing Avro aircraft, though it was built by Avro at Hamble.

Like the earlier aircraft, the C.19 had a conventional airframe, a two-seat fuselage carrying a small-span wing with ailerons (to relieve rotor loads in level forward flight), and a single radial engine in the nose. The unpowered, free-spinning rotor had four wire-braced blades, or three cantilever blades in the Mk IV, and was mounted on four struts over the forward cockpit which met together to form a pyramid. The C.19 Mk I – IV did not have the tilting rotor head and associated hanging control column of later autogyros like the Cierva C.30. Instead, control was by the ailerons, elevators and rudder via a conventional column, a system that only worked effectively when the airspeed was high enough.

A major engineering refinement in the C.19 was the means to mechanically start the main rotor spinning; in earlier de la Cierva designs, the rotor had to be turned by hand or by pulling a rope, unless there was space for a takeoff run. In the C.19 Mk I, this was done aerodynamically. The tail unit of this mark was a biplane structure with endplate fins and rudders. To start the rotor, elevators and tailplanes were fixed in a near vertical position and the engine started. The wash from the propeller was deflected upwards by the tail unit through the rotor, rotating it. For the first time, this made the autogyro independent of ground crew when starting, and private ownership was a practical proposition.

The 80 hp (60 kW) Armstrong Siddeley Genet II made the Mk I machine underpowered, and it was replaced in the C.19 Mk II by a 105 hp (78 kW) Genet Major I. The C.19 Mk IIA, introduced in 1930, had a longer undercarriage and improved rotor head. Landings were often made at high angles of attack, so the rudders of the C.19 Mk III were reshaped to slope sharply upwards to avoid damage; this variant also had a 5 ft (1.52 m) increase in rotor diameter.

In the C.19 Mk IV, the rotor was started directly from the engine via a clutch mechanism, as in all future autogyros. This allowed the elaborate biplane empennage to be replaced by a more conventional monoplane tailplane. The single central fin was low and of correspondingly deep chord, to avoid being struck by the rotor. The C.19 Mk IV had a three-bladed, 34-foot-diameter (10 m) cantilever rotor. The designation C.19 Mk IVP was also used, the "P" standing for production, that started in 1931.

The final variant was the solitary C.19 Mk V, G-ABXP. The aircraft-style controls of earlier autogyros depended on airflow past ailerons, rudders and elevators; during the slow forward speed phases of takeoff and landing, these were ineffective, and accidents resulted. The C.19 Mk V lacked the small wing and all-moving control surfaces, relying instead on a tilting rotor head. Using a long control arm that reached to the rear cockpit, the pilot could direct the aircraft by tilting the plane of rotation of the rotor. After a period of experimentation, the C.19 Mk V flew with a small fixed tailplane and a two-bladed rotor. This control system was adopted for the Cierva C.30.

== Operational history ==
Some thirty examples were built in England, with licences acquired by Focke-Wulf to produce it in Germany and by Lioré et Olivier in France (as the C.21), although no actual French production took place.

Initially, all fifteen C.19 Mk IVPs appeared on the British civil register. One was used in an attempted flight to South Africa, although it only reached Tunis. Later, it flew with Alan Cobham's Circus. Another went to an autogyro flying school at London Air Park, Hanworth. Several machines were reregistered abroad: in Australia, Germany, Japan, New Zealand, Singapore, Spain (one for the Spanish Air Force) and Sweden.

During the early 1930s, the Royal Air Force operated two C.19 Mk IIIs for evaluation of the autogyro concept (serials K1696 and K1948).

== Variants ==
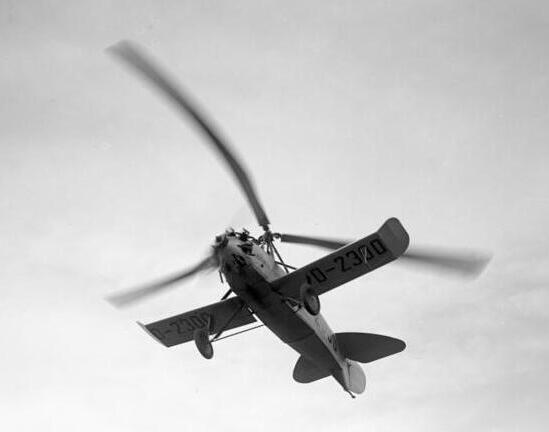
Cierva C.19 (Focke-Wulf C 19 "Heuschrecke") in flight

- C.19 Mk.I – The original three prototypes, powered by a 60 kW (80 hp) Armstrong Siddeley Genet radial piston engine. (three built)
- C.19 Mk.II – This variant was powered by a 78 kW (105 hp) Armstrong Siddeley Genet Major radial piston engine. The Genet Major engine was used on all further variants. (three built)
  - C.19 Mk.IIA – Mk.II with improved rotor head. (one built)
- C.19 Mk.III – (six built)
- C.19 Mk.IV – The definitive production version, the basis for foreign licences. (15 built)
- C.19 Mk.V – One-off experimental aircraft, tilting rotor head development machine. (one built)
- Focke-Wulf C.19 "Heuschrecke" ("Grasshopper") – licence-built version with Siemens Sh 14 engine. (one prototype, converted from C.19 Mk.IV)
- C.21 – Lioré et Olivier licence-built version. (not built)

== Survivors ==
An Avro-built C.19 Mk.IVP (EC-AIM) is on display at the Museo del Aire, Cuatro Vientos, Madrid, Spain.

== Specifications (Mk.II) ==
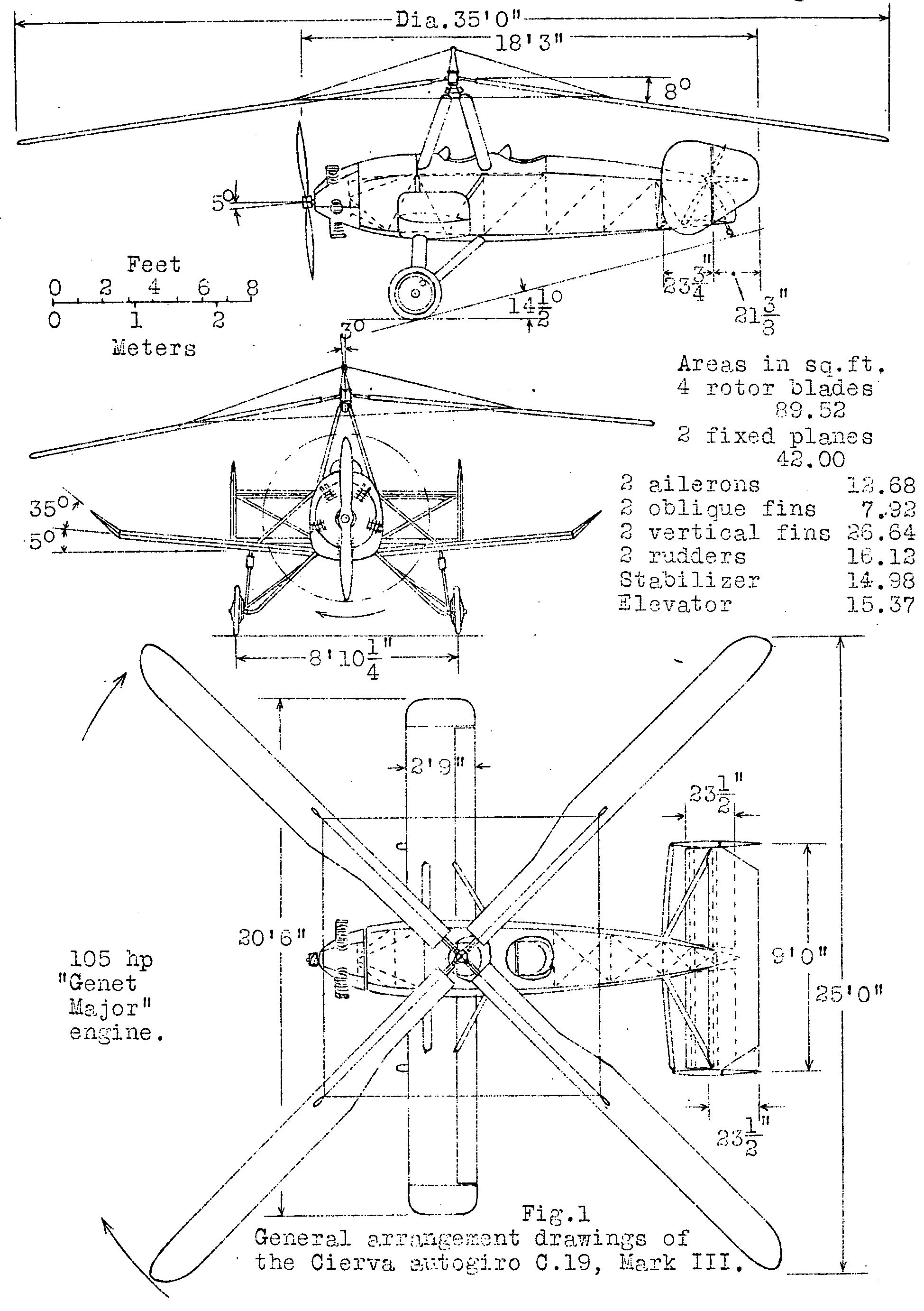
Cierva C.19 Mk.III 3-view drawing from NACA Aircraft Circular No.120

General characteristics

- Crew: one pilot
- Capacity: one passenger
- Length: 18 ft 0 in (5.49 m)
- Height: 10 ft 0 in (3.05 m)
- Wing area: 708 sq ft (65.8 m^{2})
- Empty weight: 850 lb (386 kg)
- Gross weight: 1,400 lb (635 kg)
- Powerplant: 1 × Armstrong Siddeley Genet Major I five-cylinder radial , 105 hp (78 kW)
- Main rotor diameter: 30 ft 0 in (9.15 m)

Performance

- Maximum speed: 95 mph (153 km/h, 83 kn)
- Range: 300 mi (483 km, 260 nmi)
- Rate of climb: 500 ft/min (2.5 m/s)

== See also ==
Aircraft of comparable role, configuration, and era

- Buhl A-1 Autogyro
- Pitcairn PCA-2
- Pitcairn PA-18

Related lists

- List of aircraft of the Royal Air Force

== Bibliography ==
- Elliott, Bryn (January–February 1999). "On the Beat: The First 60 Years of Britain's Air Police". Air Enthusiast (79): 68–75. ISSN 0143-5450.
- Jackson, A.J. Avro Aircraft since 1908. (1965) London: Putnam Aeronautical Books pages 433–5.
