= Cierva C.9 =

C.9
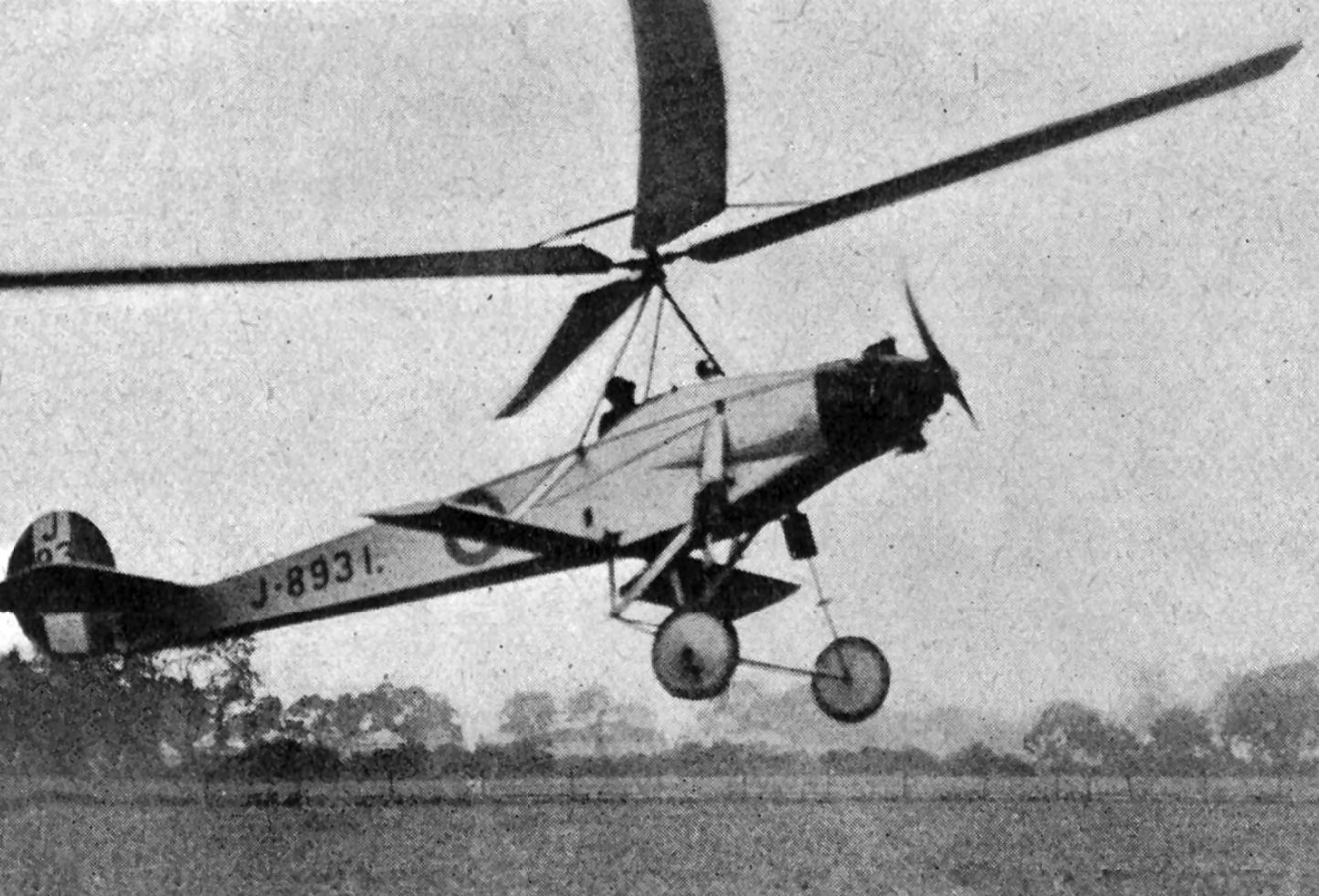

General information
- Type: Experimental autogyro
- Manufacturer: Cierva
- Designer: Juan de la Cierva
- Number built: 2

History
- First flight: 1927

The Cierva C.9 was an experimental autogyro built by Cierva in England in 1927, in association with Avro. It was the first of Cierva's autogyro designs to feature an original, purpose-built fuselage (as opposed to re-using fuselages from existing fixed-wing aircraft). Two examples were built - a single-seat machine (known to Avro as the Type 576) and a two-seater (the Type 581).
