= Ground resonance =

Phenomenon in helicopter aerodynamics

Ground resonance is an imbalance in the rotation of a helicopter rotor when the blades become bunched up on one side of their rotational plane and cause an oscillation in phase with the frequency of the rocking of the helicopter on its landing gear. The effect is similar to the behavior of a washing machine when the clothes are concentrated in one place during the spin cycle. It occurs when the landing gear is prevented from freely moving about on the horizontal plane, typically when the aircraft is on the ground.

Ground resonance cannot occur in a helicopter whose main rotor has two blades, as these rotors do not permit the blades to lead or lag.

== Causes and consequences ==
Helicopter rotor joints Illustration of the shift in the location of the center of mass of a helicopter rotor caused by the individual blades' rotation in their respective vertical joints.

Articulated rotor systems with drag hinges allow each blade to advance or lag in its rotation to compensate for the stress on the blade caused by the acceleration and deceleration of the rotor hub (due to momentum conservation). When the spacing of the blades becomes irregular, it shifts the rotor's center of mass from the axis of rotation, which causes an oscillation. When the airframe begins to rock back and forth from the oscillation, the oscillations can reinforce each other and cause the rotor's center of gravity to spiral away from the axis of rotation to a point beyond the compensating ability of the damping system.

Ground resonance is usually precipitated by a hard landing or an asymmetrical ground contact, and is more likely to occur when components of the landing gear or damping system are improperly maintained, such as the drag hinge dampers, oleo struts, or wheel tire pressure. Under extreme conditions, the initial shock can cause violent oscillations that quickly build and result in catastrophic damage of the entire airframe. In some cases, destruction occurs, e.g. body panels, fuel tanks, and engines are torn away, even at normal rotor speed.

== Mitigation ==
Proper maintenance of the helicopter's damping system components can prevent ground resonance from taking hold. When it does occur, recovery is often possible if action is taken quickly. If sufficient rotor RPM exists, immediate takeoff can restore rotor balance by allowing the airframe to move and help damp the oscillation freely. Complete shutdown may be sufficient if rotor RPM is very low during a ground resonance incident.

== See also ==
- Helicopter flight controls
- Helicopter pilotage
- Helicopter rotor
- Aeronautical engineering
