= James George Weir =

- Born: 23 May 1887; Cambuslang, Scotland
- Died: 7 November 1973 (aged 86)
- Military career
- Allegiance: United Kingdom
- Branch: British Army (1906–1918); Royal Air Force (1918–1920)
- Service years: 1906–1920
- Rank: Air Commodore
- Conflicts: First World War
- Awards: Companion of the Order of St Michael and St George; Commander of the Order of the British Empire; Officer of the Order of the Crown of Italy; Officer of the Legion of Honour (France)
- Other work: Director of the Bank of England

Air Commodore James George Weir, CMG, CBE (23 May 1887 – 7 November 1973) was an early Scottish aviator and airman. He was a successful industrialist who financed Juan de la Cierva's development of the autogiro.

== Biography ==
Weir was born in Cambuslang, Lanarkshire, Scotland in 1887 the son of James Weir of G. & J. Weir Ltd. and younger brother of William Douglas Weir. Both were involved in the family engineering firm.

Weir was commissioned on 24 February 1906 as an officer in the 3rd (Renfrewshire) Volunteer Battalion, Princess Louise's (Argyll and Sutherland Highlanders). On 1 April 1908 he transferred to the 3rd Highland (Howitzer) Brigade, Royal Field Artillery.

On 27 June 1911 Weir was found guilty of striking and knocking down on 13 April 1911 a former fiancé of his sister after he had broken off their engagement.

Weir was awarded the 24th Royal Aero Club aviators certificate after flying a Bleriot Monoplane at Hendon on 8 November 1910. In 1914 he was transferred to the Royal Flying Corps. He retired from the Royal Air Force on transfer to the Territorial Force.

In 1926 he helped form and became chairman and managing director of the Cierva Autogiro Company. He later, in 1935, became a Director of the Bank of England. He was also deputy director of the family engineering company, G. & J. Weir Ltd. Weir commuted to work daily in an autogiro, and Alfred Hitchcock worked the aircraft into the film The 39 Steps.

== Mora Weir ==
Weir married Mora (nee Morton) at St Giles in 1915

Mora was the first woman to be awarded a rotorcraft licence, and would regularly pilot her husband from their home on Skeldon House, Ayrshire to the Weir factory in Cathcart, Glasgow. Mora is amongst the women aviation pioneers listedi in List of women aviators

== Honours and awards ==
- 1 January 1918 Major (Temp./Lt. Col.) James George Weir, RFA, was appointed a Companion of the Order of St Michael and St George (CMG) in recognition of valuable services in connection with the War.
- 8 November 1918 Lt.Col ) (A./Brig.-Genl.) James George Weir, CMG, (RFA) was appointed an Officer of the Order of the Crown of Italy.
- 3 June 1919 appointed a Commander of the Order of the British Empire (CBE)
- 11 July 1919 – Lt.-Col. (A./Brig.-Genl.) James George Weir, CMG, CBE (RA, TF) was appointed an Officer of the Légion d'honneur by the President of the French Republic.

== See also ==
- Cierva W.9
- Cierva Air Horse
