= Cierva C.30 =

1933 autogyro family by Cierva

C.30
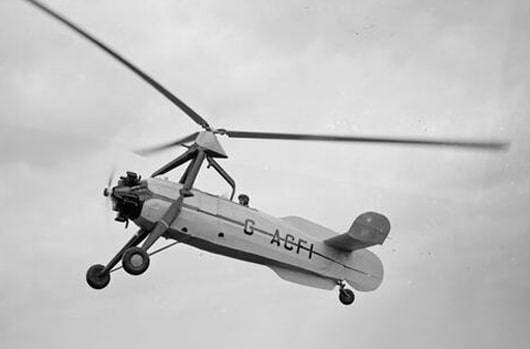
- Cierva C.30 climbing out on take off

General information
- Type: Autogyro
- Designer: Juan de la Cierva
- Number built: 148

History
- Introduction date: 1934
- First flight: April 1933
- Variant: Cierva C.40

The Cierva C.30 is an autogyro designed by Juan de la Cierva and built under licence from the Cierva Autogiro Company by A V Roe & Co Ltd (Avro) as the Avro 671, Lioré-et-Olivier as the LeO C.301, and Focke-Wulf.

== Design and development ==
Before the experimental Cierva C.19 Mk V, autogyros had been controlled in the same way as fixed-wing aircraft, that is by deflecting the air flowing over moving surfaces such as ailerons, elevators and rudder. At the very low speeds encountered in autogyro flight, particularly during landing, these controls became ineffective. The experimental machine showed that the way forward was a tilting rotor hub fitted with a hanging stick extending to the pilot's cockpit with which he could change the rotor plane. This was known as direct control and was fitted to the C.30. The production variant, called C.30A in England, was preceded by several development machines.

The first production design in the series was the C.30, a radial-engined autogyro with a three-blade, 37 ft (11.3 m) rotor mounted on an aft-leaning tripod, the control column extending into the rear of the two cockpits. The engine was the five-cylinder, 105 hp (78 kW) Armstrong Siddeley Genet Major I used in the C.19 series. The fabric-covered fuselage carried an unbraced tailplane, without elevators but with turned-up tips. The port side of the tailplane had an inverted aerofoil section to counter roll-axis torque produced by the propeller. As with most autogyros, a high vertical tail was precluded by the sagging resting rotor, so the dorsal fin was long and low, extending well aft of the tailplane like a fixed rudder and augmented by a ventral fin. The wide-track undercarriage had a pair of single, wire-braced legs and a small tail wheel was fitted. This model flew in April 1933. It was followed by four improved machines designated C.30P (P here for pre-production) which differed in having a four-legged pyramid rotor mounting and a reinforced undercarriage with three struts per side. The rotor could be folded rearwards for transport. The C.30P used the more powerful (140 hp, 104 kW) seven-cylinder Armstrong Siddeley Genet Major IA radial engine.

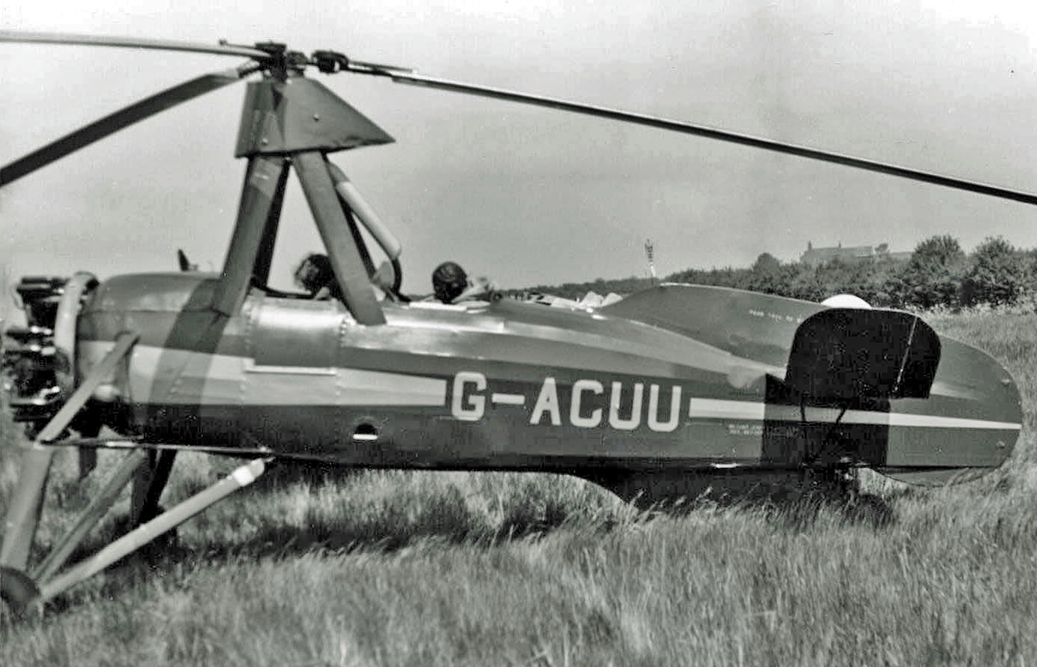
Avro 671 (Cierva C.30A) taxiing for take-off at Auster's Rearsby Aerodrome in June 1951

The production model, called the C.30A by Avro, was built under licence in Britain, France and Germany and was similar to the C.30P. The main alteration was a further increase in undercarriage track with revised strutting, the uppermost leg having a pronounced knee with wire bracing. There was additional bracing to the tailplane and both it and the fin carried small movable trimming surfaces. Each licensee used nationally built engines and used slightly different names. In all, 143 production C.30s were built, making it by far the most numerous pre-war autogyro.

Between 1933 and 1936, de la Cierva used one C.30A (G-ACWF) to test his last contribution to autogyro development before his death in the crash of a KLM Douglas DC-2 airliner when taking off at Croydon Airfield in England on 9 December 1936. To enable the autogyro to take off without forward ground travel, Cierva produced the "autodynamic" rotor head, which allowed the rotor to be spun up by the engine in the usual way but to higher than take-off r.p.m at zero rotor incidence and then to reach operational positive pitch suddenly enough to jump some 20 ft (6 m) upwards.

At least one Royal Air Force (RAF) C.30A was on floats as a Sea Rota in January 1935.

=== Production ===
Avro

Avro obtained the licence in 1934 and subsequently built 78 examples, under their model designation, fitted with an Armstrong Siddeley Genet Major IA (known in the RAF as the Civet 1) 7-cylinder radial engine producing 140 hp (100 kW). The first production C.30A was delivered in July 1934.

Lioré-et-Olivier

Twenty-five aircraft were built in France by Lioré-et-Olivier as the LeO C.301 with a 175 hp (130 kW) Salmson 9NE 9-cylinder radial engine.

Focke-Wulf

Forty aircraft were built in Germany as the Focke-Wulf Fw 30 Heuschrecke (Grasshopper) with a 140 hp (105 kW) Siemens Sh 14A 7-cylinder radial engine.

== Operational history ==
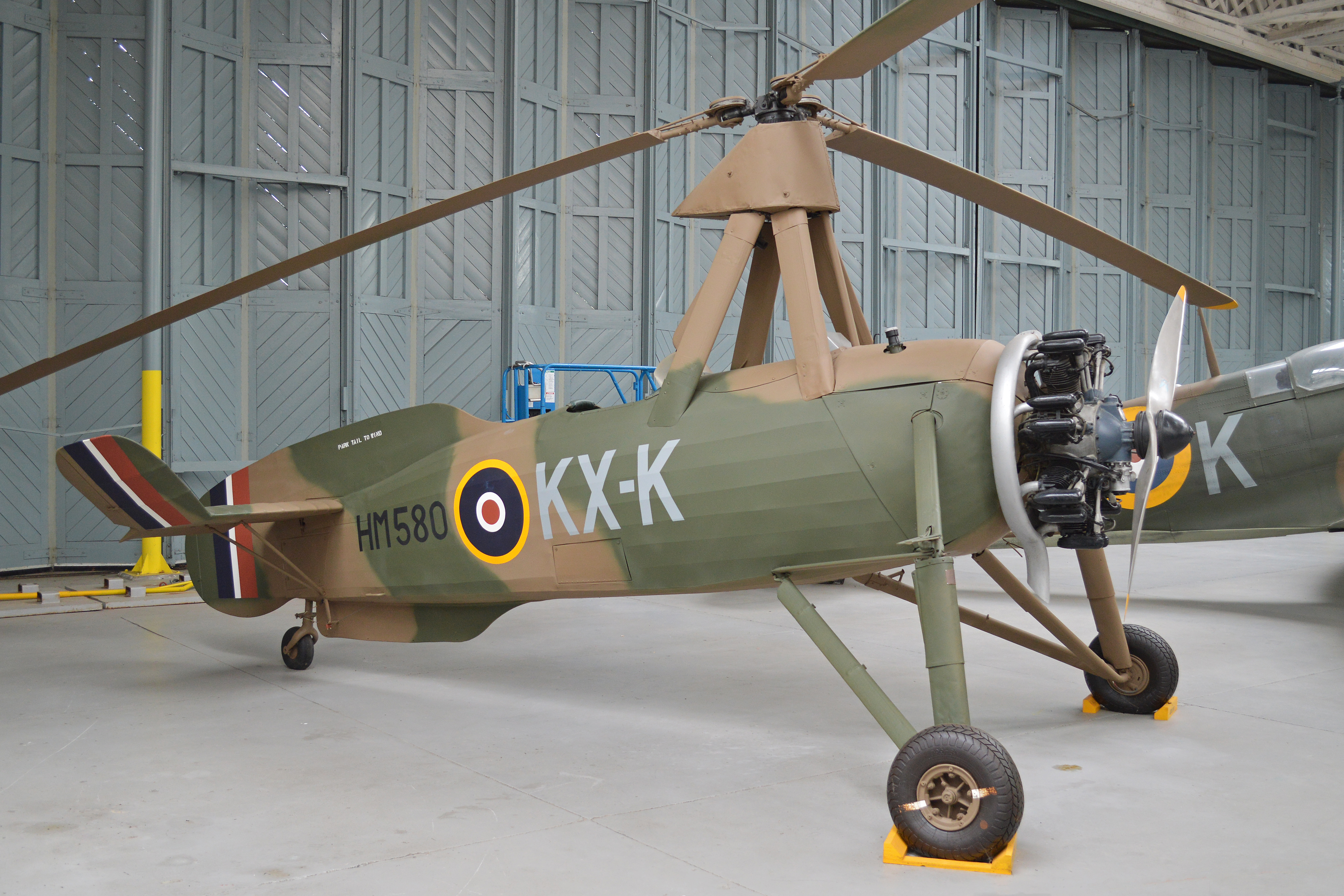
Avro 671 Rota Mk 1 at Imperial War Museum, Duxford

Of the 66 non-RAF aircraft built in the UK by Avro, 37 appeared at least for a while on the UK register. Some (maybe a dozen) were sold abroad, but others were flown by wealthy enthusiasts and by flying clubs who offered autogyro training. By the end of the decade, private flyers were moving back to the comforts and economies of fixed-wing aircraft and more C.30s moved abroad leaving the Autogyro Flying Club at London Air Park, Hanworth as the major UK user. 26 aircraft were directly exported by Avro. These went both to private owners and to foreign air forces who wish to investigate the autogyro's potential.

In 1934, one Spanish Navy C.30 piloted by Cierva landed on the Spanish Seaplane tender Dedalo anchored in Valencia harbour and later made a takeoff.

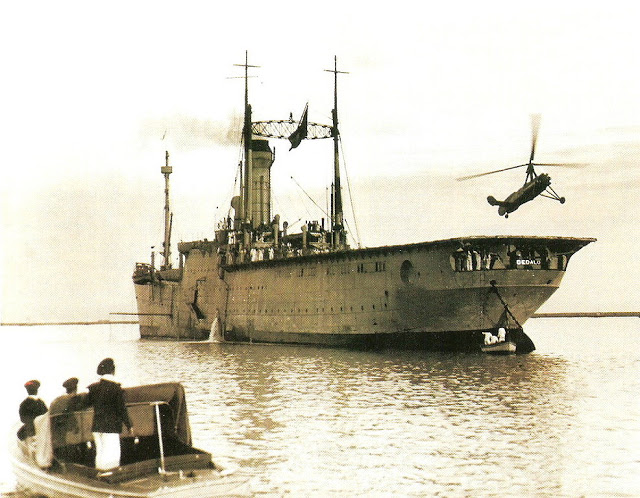
Juan de la Cierva´s Cierva C.30 autogyro taking off from Dédalo in 1934

In September 1935, five members of the Lithuanian Aero Club flew C.30A in the "air train" together with the glider Schneider Grunau Baby and the airplane de Havilland DH.60 Moth over the Baltic Sea states: Kaunas, Riga, Tallinn, Helsinki.

Twelve C.30As built by Avro for the Royal Air Force (RAF) entered service as the Avro 671 Rota Mk 1 (Serials K4230 to K4239 and K4296 & K4775). The twelve were delivered between 1934 and 1935. They equipped the School of Army Co-operation at RAF Old Sarum near Salisbury.

Many of the surviving civil aircraft were also taken into RAF service between 1939 and 1940. In 1940, they equipped 1448 Flt. at RAF Duxford. Later they equipped 529 Sqn. at RAF Halton on radar calibration work: disbanded in October 1945, the twelve survivors were sold on to civilian owners.

Most of these did not last long, although two were used for pilot rotary wing experience by Fairey in their Fairey Gyrodyne helicopter programme. Rota Towels kept one ex-RAF Rota airworthy G-AHTZ until an accident in 1958. G-ACUU, the Imperial War Museum's C.30A exhibit at Duxford had one of the longest active lives. It joined Air Service Training Ltd in 1934, was impressed (as Rota HM580) in 1942, serving with 529 Squadron and returning to civil use by G.S. Baker based at Birmingham's Elmdon Airport with its original registration plus the nickname Billy Boy and was not withdrawn from use until 1960.

After several years of work at the Maestranza Aérea de Albacete, on 15 January 1998, a C.30 was flown again. It was piloted by Lieutenant Colonel Fernando Iglesia. After an accident in June 2000, which almost left the pilot without an arm, the aircraft was handed over to the Museum of Aeronautics and Astronautics, located at the Cuatro Vientos air base (Madrid).

== Variants ==
C.30
Powered by a 105 hp (78 kW) Armstrong Siddeley Genet Major I radial piston engine.
C.30P
Improved model, powered by a 140 hp (104 kW) Armstrong Siddeley Genet Major IA radial piston engines
C.30A
Main production model, powered by a 140 hp (104 kW) Armstrong Siddeley Genet Major IA radial piston engine.
Rota Mk I
RAF designation of the Cierva C.30A.
Lioré et Olivier LeO C-30
59 license built Cierva C.30, powered by 175 hp (130 kW) Salmson 9Ne engines, were supplied to the French Air Force and French Navy. All LeO C-30 autogyros were destroyed or captured by German forces during the invasion of France in 1940.
Lioré et Olivier LeO C-30S
Construction number 26 was completed as the sole C-30S.
Lioré-et-Olivier LeO C-301
Improved C-30s with uprated Messier oleo-pneumatic shock absorbers, flotation devices to facilitate ditching at sea and tripod main rotor support. Six aircraft were delivered to the French Navy by early June 1940.
Lioré et Olivier LeO C-302
Early autogyros suffered from relatively long take-off runs. To reduce the take-off length two C-301 aircraft were fitted with the equivalent of Cierva's "Jump" head allowing the aircraft to leap vertically after only a very short run. The C-302s were used extensively for testing rotor and undercarriage components but development was eventually abandoned in 1949/1950.
Focke-Wulf C 30 Heuschrecke
(Heuschrecke (Grasshopper)): 40 aircraft built, each with a 140 hp (104 kW) Siemens Sh 14A 7-cylinder radial engine.

== Aircraft on display ==
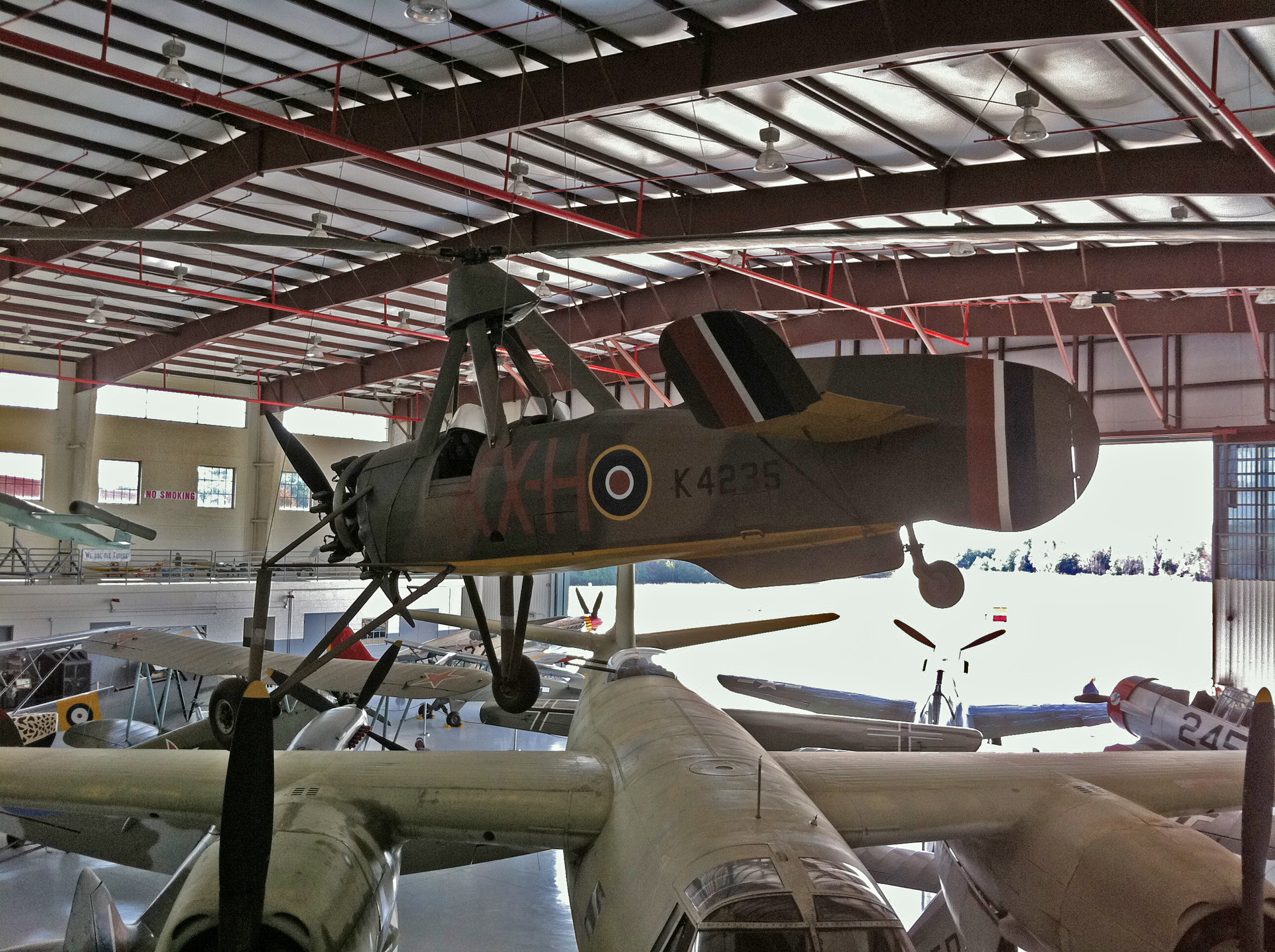
A C.30 on display at Fantasy of Flight in Polk City, Florida

Argentina

- Cierva C.30A LV-FBL is on display at the Museo Nacional de Aeronáutica de Argentina.

Australia

- Cierva C.30A VH-USR is on display at the Powerhouse Museum, Sydney.

France

- Leo C-302 F-BDAD is on display at the Musée de l'Air et de l'Espace, Paris.

Italy

- Cierva C.30 I-CIER is on display at the Museo della Scienza e della Tecnologia "Leonardo da Vinci", Milan.

Netherlands

- Cierva C.30A SE-AFI is on display at the Aviodrome.

Spain

- Cierva C.30A XVU.1-1 flyable reproduction with a Siemens engine is on display at Museo del Aire, Madrid.

United Kingdom

- Avro Rota I K4232 on display at the Royal Air Force Museum, London, England.
- Cierva C.30A AP506 (smashed wreck) on display at the Helicopter Museum, Weston-super-Mare, England.
- Cierva C.30A AP507 on display at the Science Museum in London, England.
- Avro Rota I HM580 the former G-ACUU is on display at the Imperial War Museum Duxford, England.

United States

- Cierva C.30A K4235 on display at Fantasy of Flight, Polk City, Florida.

== Military operators ==
Denmark

- Royal Danish Air Force

France

- French Air Force
- French Naval Aviation

United Kingdom

- Royal Air Force
  - No. 80 Squadron RAF
  - No. 529 Squadron RAF

== Civil operators ==
Lithuania

- Aero Club of Lithuania - single Avro-built C.30A, acquired in 1934

== Specifications (C.30A) ==
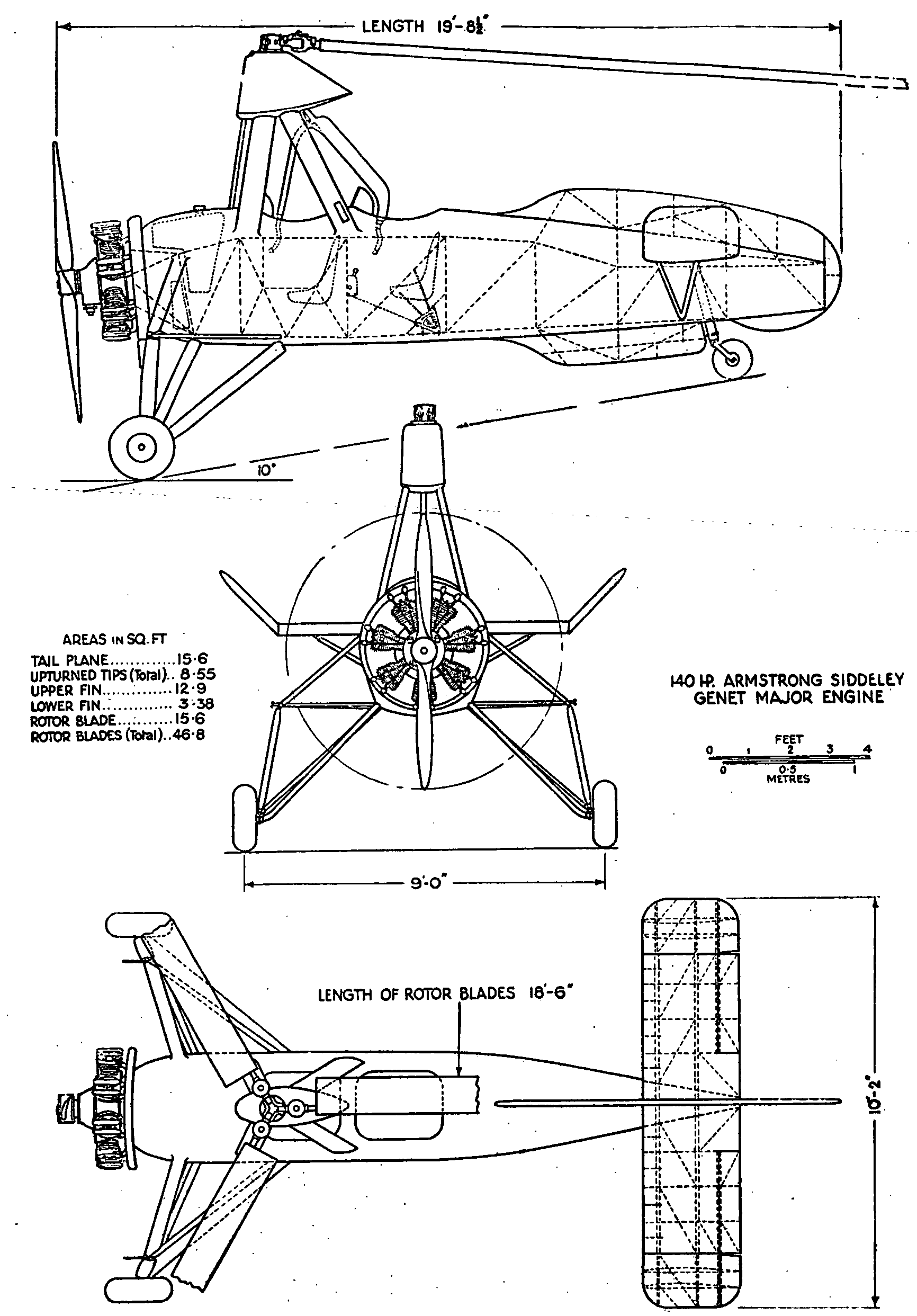
Avro C.30A 3-view drawing from NACA-AC-196

General characteristics

- Crew: 1
- Capacity: 1 passenger
- Length: 19 ft 8 in (6 m)
- Height: 11 ft 1 in (3.38 m)
- Empty weight: 1,220 lb (553 kg)
- Gross weight: 1,600 lb (726 kg)
- Powerplant: 1 × Armstrong Siddeley Genet Major IA 7-cyl. air-cooled radial piston engine, 140 hp (100 kW)
- Main rotor diameter: 37 ft 0 in (11.28 m)
- Main rotor area: 1,100 sq ft (100 m^{2})

Performance

- Maximum speed: 96 kn (110 mph, 180 km/h)
- Cruise speed: 83 kn (95 mph, 153 km/h)
- Range: 248 nmi (285 mi, 459 km)
- Rate of climb: 700 ft/min (3.6 m/s)
