= Cierva W.9 =

British helicopter

W.9
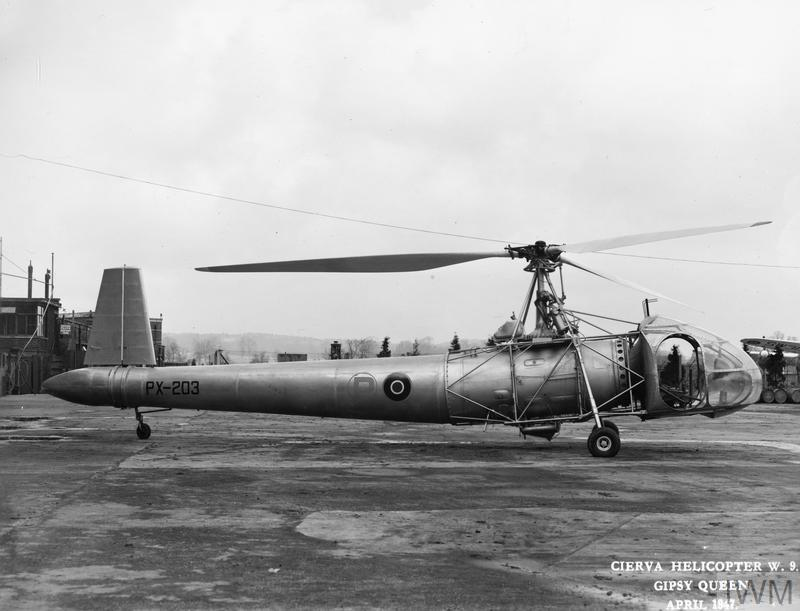

General information
- Type: Experimental helicopter
- Manufacturer: Cierva Autogiro Company, Ltd.
- Primary user: Air Ministry

History
- First flight: 1945
- Retired: 1946

The Cierva W.9 was a British 1940s experimental helicopter with a three-blade tilting-hub controlled main rotor, and torque compensation achieved using a jet of air discharged from the rear port side of the fuselage. The design was not further developed into production, and the prototype crashed in 1946.

== Development ==
In 1943, primary investor G & J Weir Ltd. revived the moribund Cierva Autogiro Company to develop an experimental helicopter to Air Ministry Specification E.16/43. The W.9 was to investigate James G. Weir's contention that a powered tilting hub-controlled rotor with automatic collective pitch control, and torque reaction control using jet efflux, was both safer and more efficient than the Sikorsky R-4 helicopter fitted with manually controlled main rotor cyclic and collective pitch and the anti-torque tail rotor system. The W.9 was completed late in 1944 and assigned serial PX203. It was damaged during ground-running due to incorrect control phasing arising from a high order of pitch-flap coupling, and did not start test flying until 1945.

The most visible characteristic of the W.9 was torque compensation and directional control by using blown air rather than a tail rotor. A variable pitch fan cooled the engine; the heated air and engine exhaust passed through the long hollow tailboom and exhausted to port. Foot pedals controlled the fan pitch. Of more importance, however, was the shaft-driven hydraulically actuated rotor hub with rotational speed variation to give automatic collective pitch control. Development of the rotor system resulted in a tilting hub combined with cyclic pitch control of each blade to minimize control forces. Manual control of collective pitch was added to the automatic collective pitch change system to provide precise vertical control in hover and the ability to cushion a landing from an autorotative descent.

The W.9 was first publicly demonstrated during an air display in Southampton on 22 June 1946. It was displayed at the Seventh SBAC Airshow at Radlett in 1946

The helicopter was destroyed in an accident in 1946 and the project was abandoned. Parts of the W.9 rotor hub were used in the W.14 Skeeter prototype.

Cierva was bought out by Saunders-Roe, and that design entered production service in the 1950s as the Saunders-Roe Skeeter.

== Specifications (W.9) ==
Data from Flight

General characteristics

- Crew: two
- Length: 37 ft (11 m)
- Height: 10 ft (3.0 m)
- Gross weight: 2,647 lb (1,201 kg)
- Powerplant: 1 × de Havilland Gipsy Queen 31 6-cyl. air-cooled in-line piston engine, 205 hp (153 kW)
- Main rotor diameter: 36 ft 0 in (10.97 m)
- Main rotor area: 1,017 sq ft (94.5 m^{2})

== Operators ==
United Kingdom

- Air Ministry

== See also ==
- NOTAR
