= Cierva C.40 =

C.40
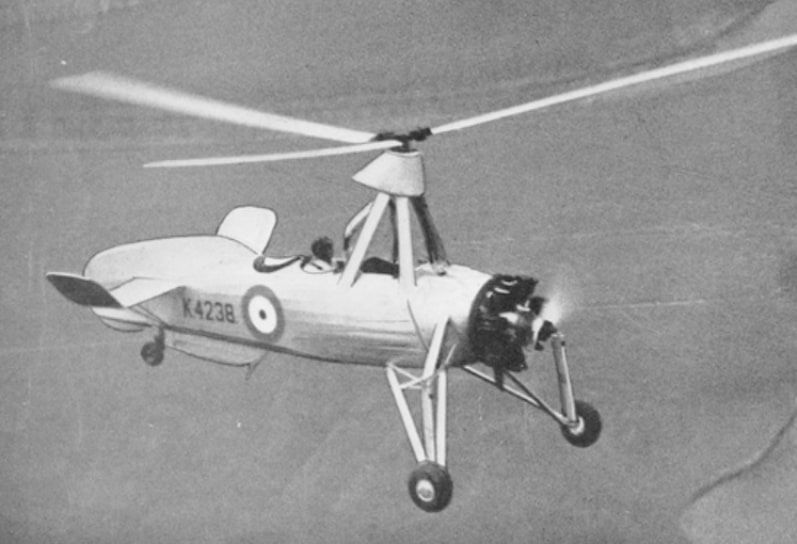

General information
- Type: Autogyro
- National origin: United Kingdom
- Manufacturer: British Aircraft Manufacturing Company
- Designer: J.A.J. Bennett
- Primary user: Royal Air Force
- Number built: 9

History
- First flight: 1938
- Developed from: Cierva C.30

The Cierva C.40 was a British autogyro designed by G.B.L. Ellis, Otto Reder, and Dr. J.A.J Bennett and was assembled by the British Aircraft Manufacturing Company at London Air Park, Hanworth.

== Development ==
The C.40 was the last autogiro produced by the Cierva Autogiro Company, Ltd. Design commenced in July 1936 and continued after Cierva's death in an airliner crash in December of that year. Based on the C.30A Autogiro the C.40 was originally intended to use a higher power version of the Armstrong Siddeley Genet Major engine. Utilizing the lessons of autodynamic rotor development underway since 1933, the C.40 rotor included three flexible blades to suppress vibration and were attached to the rotor hub through inclined flap and drag hinges to give jump-takeoff capability. It had two side-by-side seats in a wooden fuselage and the production version was powered by a Salmson 9NG radial engine, problems with which delayed introduction of the C.40 into service until mid-1938.

== Operational history ==
In 1938 the British Aircraft Manufacturing Company assembled nine C.40s at London Air Park, Hanworth, and seven were delivered to the Royal Air Force. The remaining two were registered to the Cierva Autogiro Company, one was lost in France in June 1940, and the other was impressed into RAF service.

== Operators ==
United Kingdom

- Royal Air Force
- Royal Navy

== Specification ==
Data from

General characteristics

- Crew: 2 (pilot, observer)
- Empty weight: 1,350 lb (612 kg)
- Max takeoff weight: 1,950 lb (885 kg)
- Main rotor diameter: × 40 ft 0 in (12.19 m)

Performance

- Maximum speed: 120 mph (190 km/h, 100 kn)
- Cruise speed: 100 mph (160 km/h, 87 kn)
- Range: 200 mi (320 km, 170 nmi)

== See also ==
Related lists

- List of rotorcraft
- List of aircraft of the Royal Air Force
