= Tip jet =

Jet nozzle at the tip of some helicopter rotor blades

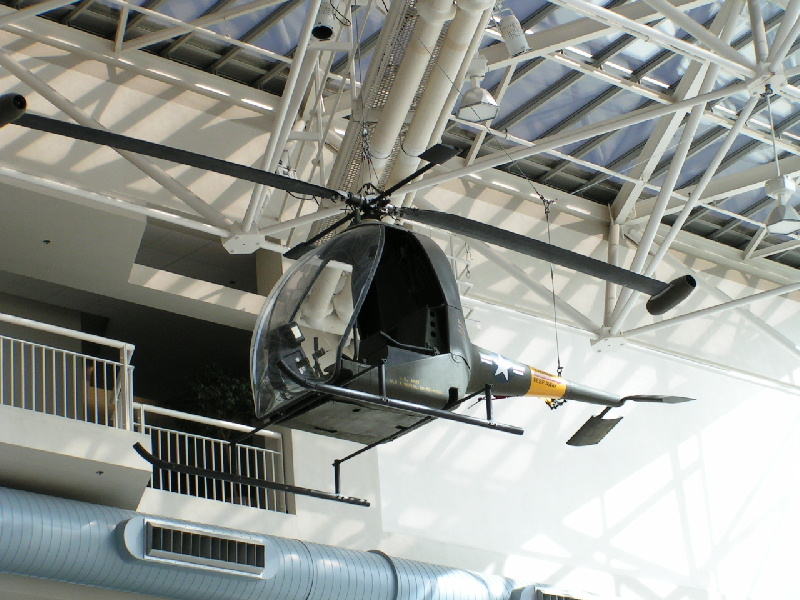
The Hiller Hornet was one of the first tip-jet–powered aircraft.

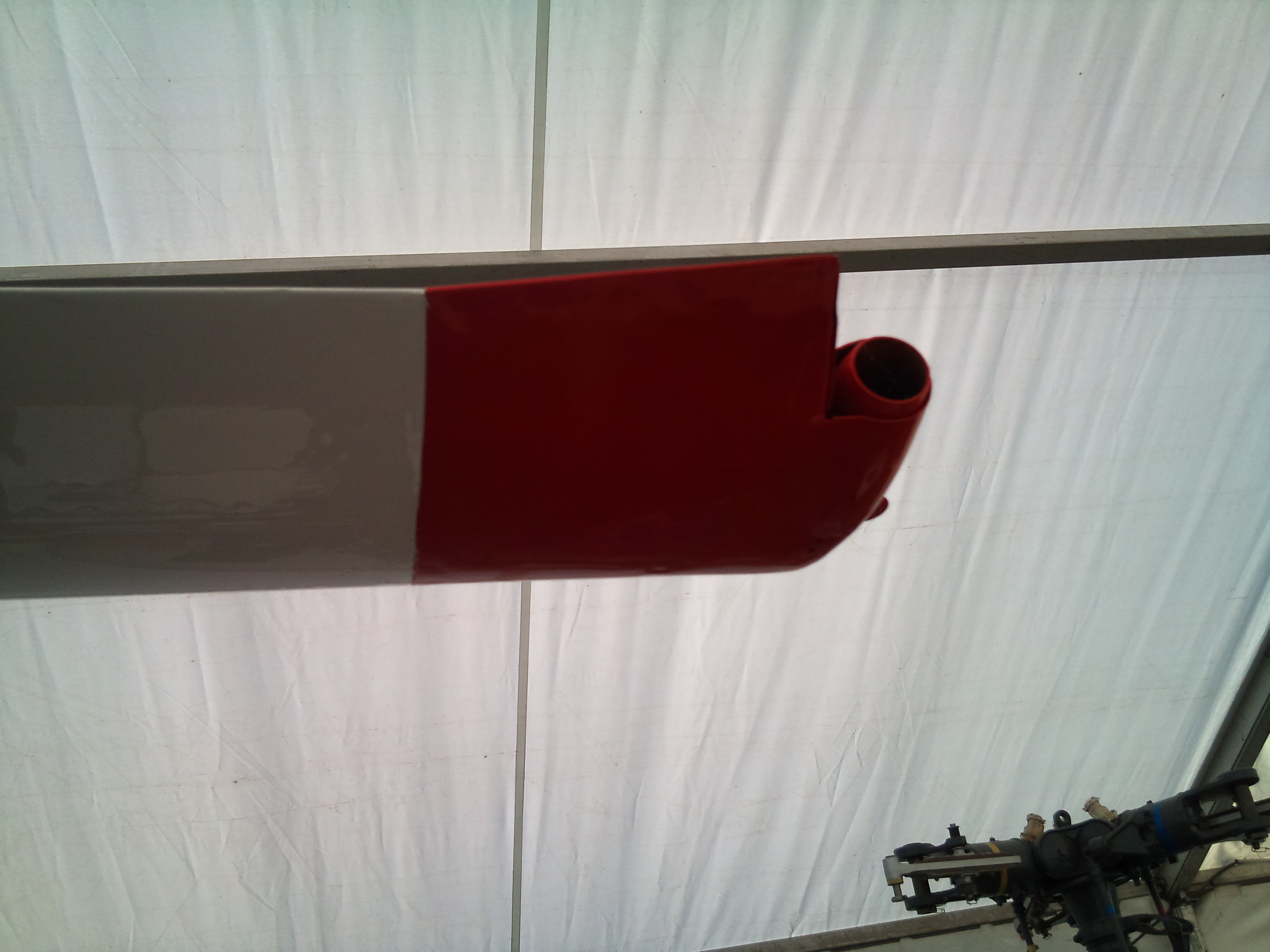
Tip jet of an SNCASO SO.1221 Djinn

A tip jet is a jet nozzle at the tip of some helicopter rotor blades, used to spin the rotor, much like a Catherine wheel firework. Tip jets replace the normal shaft drive and have the advantage of placing no torque on the airframe, thus not requiring the presence of a tail rotor. Some simple monocopters are composed of nothing but a single blade with a tip rocket.

Tip jets can use compressed air, provided by a separate engine, to create jet thrust. Other types use a system that functions similarly to the afterburner (reheat) on a conventional jet engine, except that instead of reheating a gas jet, they serve as the primary heater, creating greater thrust than the flow of pre-compressed air alone; the best description of this is thrust augmentation. Other designs includes ramjets or even a complete turbojet engine. Some, known as rocket-on-rotor systems, involve placing rockets on the tips of the rotor blades that are fueled from a tank.

If the helicopter's engine fails, the tip jets on the rotor increase the moment of inertia, hence permitting it to store energy, which makes performing a successful autorotation landing somewhat easier. However, the tip jet also typically generates significant extra air drag, which demands a higher sink rate and means that a very sudden transition to the landing flare must occur for survival, with little room for error.

== History ==
=== Origins ===
During the 1900s, Austrian Ludwig Wittgenstein investigated the use of tip jets to drive an aircraft propeller while studying aeronautical engineering at Manchester University, in the United Kingdom. Wittgenstein's concept required air and gas to be forced along the propeller arms to combustion chambers on the end of each blade, at which point these gases would undergo compression via the centrifugal force exerted by the revolving arms, and thereby generating sufficient heat to achieve ignition. During 1911, Wittgenstein was able to secure a patent related to his tip jet work.

Despite the relatively early origins of the concept, achieving the next step of practical application proved to be highly difficult, largely due to propeller designs of the era being relatively primitive and incompatible with the design changes required to implement Wittgenstein's tip jets. It would be many years before a blade design that could support the innovation would be developed. Propellers of the period were typically wood, whereas more recent propeller blades are typically composed of composite materials or pressed steel laminates; the latter is manufactured as separate halves before being welded together, giving the blade a hollow interior and therefore an ideal pathway to channel the air and gas for a tip jet. Progress on the jet-powered propeller was further frustrated by Wittgenstein's lack of practical experience with machinery. He ultimately lost interest in aviation and discontinued his engineering work. Wittgenstein would become better known for his later work as a philosopher.

During the 1920s, the Italian aeronautical engineer Vittorio Isacco designed and constructed several unorthodox rotorcraft which became known as the Helicogyre. During 1929, Helicogyre K1171 was manufactured by British aircraft manufacturer S.E. Saunders Limited, and was delivered to the Royal Aircraft Establishment (RAE) at Farnborough by road, where it underwent limited testing before the programme was terminated. Although the Helicogyre did not use tipjets, being instead powered by piston engines positioned at the ends of the rotary wing, Isacco foresaw that these might be replaceable by jets.

Another pioneer in the field of tip jets was the Russian-American engineer Eugene Michael Gluhareff, the inventor of the Gluhareff Pressure Jet.

=== Into flight ===
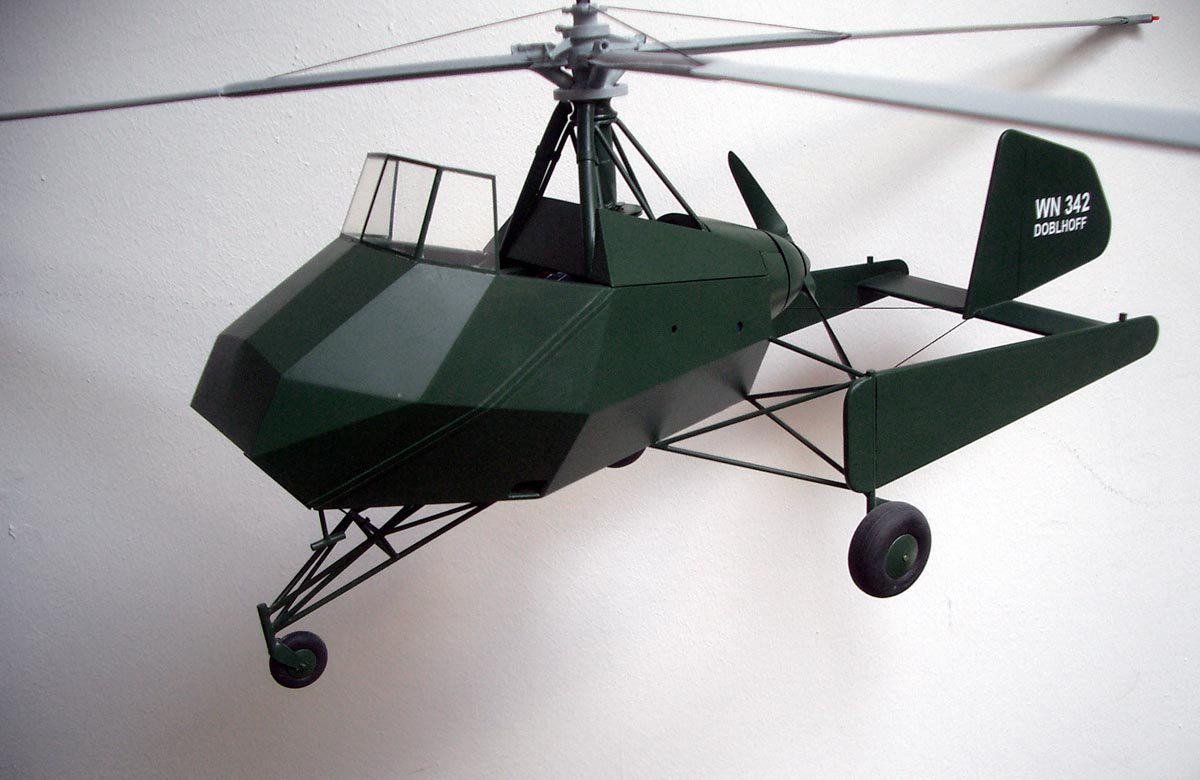
Doblhoff WNF 342 V4 model

During the Second World War, German engineer Friedrich von Doblhoff suggested powering a helicopter with ramjets located on the rotor tips. His idea was taken forwards and, during 1943, the WNF 342 V1 became the first tip jet-powered helicopter; it used a conventional piston engine to drive both a compact propeller and an air compressor to provide air (subsequently mixed with fuel) via channels in the rotor head and the hollow rotor blades to combustion chambers set at the rotor tips. In addition to the WNF 342's experimental use by Germany, two prototypes were obtained by the United States as the conflict came to a close.

Subsequently, Doblhoff joined the American aircraft manufacturer McDonnell Aircraft, which developed and flew the McDonnell XV-1, an experimental compound gyroplane, during the early 1950s. This rotorcraft was classified as a convertiplane; the propulsion system was powered by a single Continental-built R-975 radial engine that powered a pair of air compressors to feed high-pressure air through piping in the rotor blades to a combustion chamber on each of the three rotor tips, where a burner ignited fuel for increased thrust, which drove the rotors around and allowed the vehicle to fly in a manner akin to a conventional helicopter. However, while flying horizontally, the compressors were disconnected from the engine, which instead drove a two-bladed pusher propeller; in forward flight, 80 percent of the lift was provided by the wing, while the remainder was generated by the main rotor that autorotating at about 50 percent of its rpm when directly powered. The XV-1 was cancelled due to its unfavourable complexity and rapid advances made by conventional helicopters.

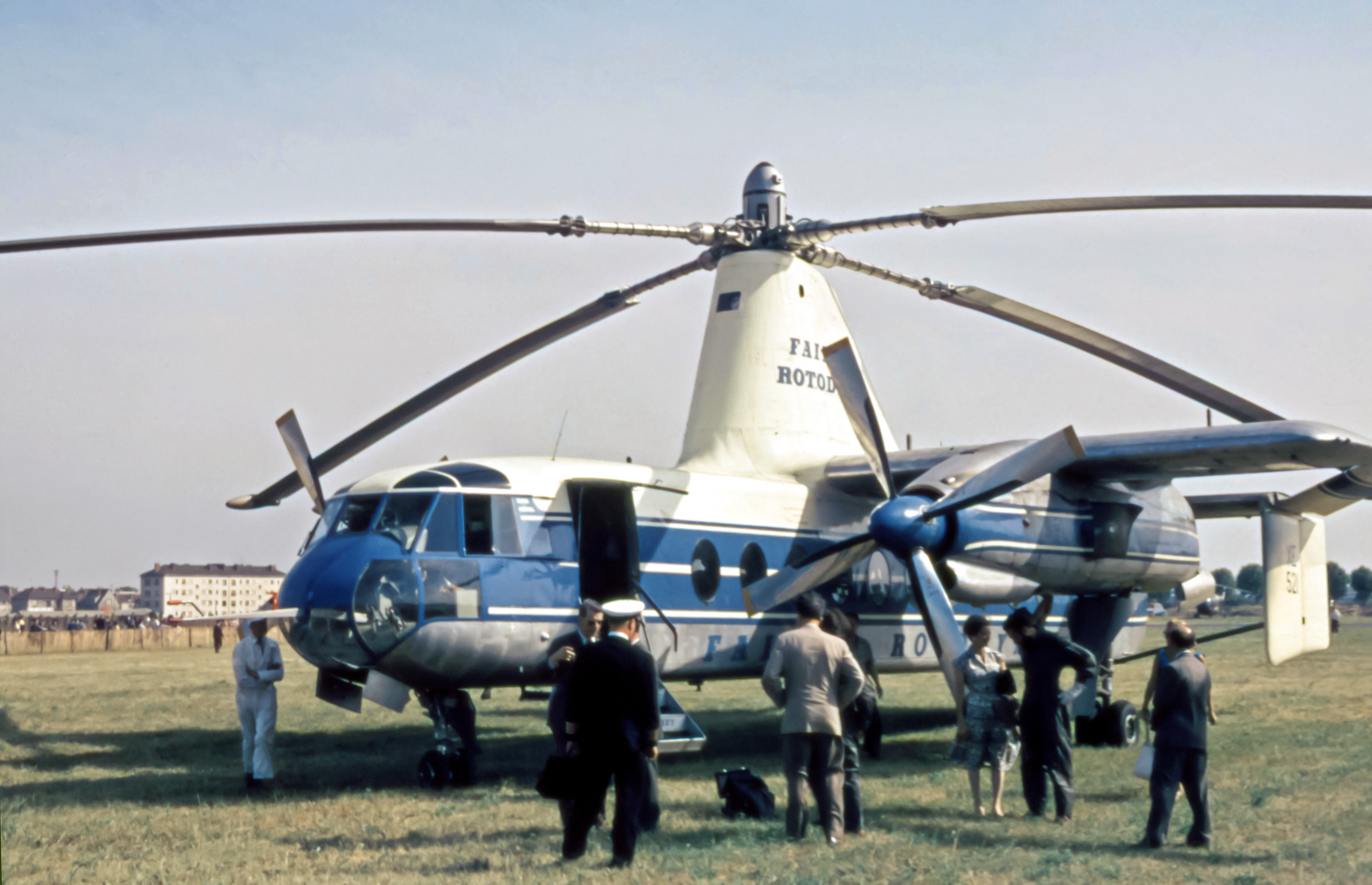
The Fairey Rotodyne prototype, circa 1959

The engineer August Stepan has been credited with producing the tip jet engines used by the British aircraft manufacturing interest Fairey Aviation. Following the Second World War, Fairey Aviation was keen to explore rotary-wing aircraft, developing the Fairey FB-1 Gyrodyne in accordance with Specification E.16/47. The second FB-1 was modified to investigate a tip-jet driven rotor coupled with a pair of propellers mounted on stub wings; it was later renamed the Jet Gyrodyne. Another rotorcraft developed by the firm, the Fairey Ultra-light Helicopter was a compact side-by-side two-seater vehicle that used tip jets powered by a single Turbomeca Palouste turbojet engine. The type led a contract from the Ministry of Supply for four flight test-capable aircraft; the Ultra-light's capabilities were subsequently demonstrated at numerous military exercises, airshows, and even at sea. However, the British Army had become more focused on the rival Saunders-Roe Skeeter, allegedly due to interest in the latter from the German government.

Drawn to a specification produced by the airline British European Airways (BEA) for a passenger-carrying rotorcraft, referred to the BEA Bus, Fairey set about developing the Fairey Rotodyne. On 6 November 1957, the Rotodyne prototype performed its maiden flight, piloted by chief helicopter test pilot Squadron Leader W. Ron Gellatly and assistant chief helicopter test pilot Lieutenant Commander John G.P. Morton as second pilot. On 10 April 1958, the Rotodyne made its first successful transition from vertical to horizontal and then back into vertical flight. On 5 January 1959, the Rotodyne set a world speed record in the convertiplane category, at 190.9 mph (307.2 km/h), over a 60-mile (100 km) closed circuit.

Both BEA and the RAF had publicly announced their interest in the Rotodyne, the latter placing an initial order for the type. Reportedly, the larger Rotodyne Z design could be developed to accommodate up to 75 passengers and, when equipped with Rolls-Royce Tyne engines, would have a projected cruising speed of 200 knots (370 km/h). It would be able to carry nearly 8 tons (7 tonnes) of freight; cargoes could have included several British Army vehicles and the intact fuselage of some fighter aircraft within its fuselage. Despite much of the development work being completed, the British government declared it would issue no further support for the Rotodyne due to economic reasons. Accordingly, on 26 February 1962, official funding for the Rotodyne was terminated.

=== Into production ===
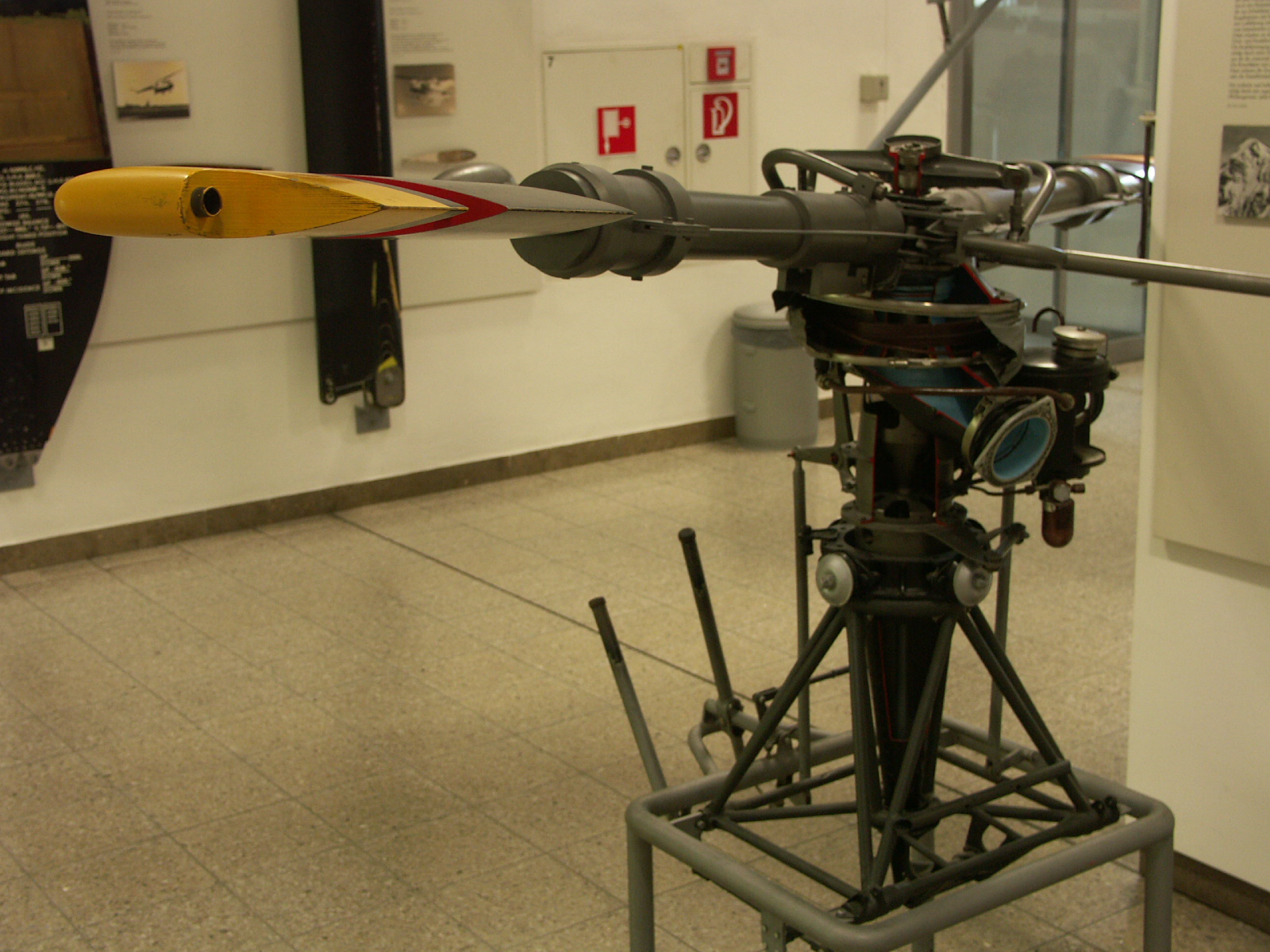
View of a Djinn's rotor mast and rotor blade

The French aircraft manufacturer Sud-Ouest would be the first company to achieve quantity production of a rotorcraft harnessing tip-jet propulsion. Having initially developed the tip jet-equipped Sud-Ouest Ariel for purely experimental purposes, the firm had sufficient confidence to proceed with a production-standard rotorcraft, the Sud-Ouest Djinn. A single seat prototype, designated S.O.1220, was constructed to function as an aerial test bed for the rotorcraft's propulsion concept. The French Army encouraged the construction of a large pre-production batch of 22 helicopters for evaluation purposes. The first of these flew on 23 September 1954. Three pre-production rotorcraft were acquired by the United States Army, designating it YHO-1, for their own trials; according to aviation author Stanley S. McGowen, the US Army held little interest in the type. According to author Wayne Mutza, the US Army had found the YHO-1 to be an excellent weapons platform, but were compelled to abandon its interest by political opposition to the procurement of a foreign designed rotorcraft.

In addition to the French military, a further ten countries placed orders for the type; such as a batch of six rotorcraft which were procured by the German Army. Production of the Djinn came to an end during the mid-1960s, by which point a total of 178 Djinns had been constructed; the type had effectively been replaced by the more conventional and highly successful Aérospatiale Alouette II. Some Djinns were sold on to civil operators; in this capacity, they were often equipped for agricultural purposes, fitted with chemical tanks and spray bars. During the late 1950s, an improved version of the Djinn, tentatively designated as the Djinn III or Super Djinn, was being studied by Sud Aviation. As envisioned, the projected Super Djinn would have adopted the newer Turbomeca Palouste IV engine alongside other changes for greater power and endurance than the original production model.

== Rotorcraft using tip jets ==
=== Cold tip jets ===
The compressed air in cold tip jets generally exited at quite high temperatures due to compression-heating effects, but they are referred to as "cold" jets to differentiate them from jets that burn fuel to heat the air for greater thrust; similar to the difference between the "cold" and "hot" exhausts on the Harrier "jump jet", which uses "cold" air heated to several hundred degrees by compression inside the low-pressure compressor of the Pegasus engine.)

- Avimech Dragonfly DF-1 - American hydrogen peroxide powered helicopter
- Dornier Do 32 - German ultra-light tip-jet helicopter, first flown on 29 June 1962: 4 built.
- Dornier Do 132 - German tip-jet helicopter project, cancelled in 1969.
- Fiat 7002 - Italian tip-jet helicopter, first flew in 1961, only one built.
- Percival P.74 - used second compressors to blend turbine exhaust with more air for efflux at wingtips. Engines never produced sufficient power and so it never flew. Further progress with the design using more powerful engines was cancelled.
- Sud-Ouest Ariel - French tip-jet powered helicopter, first flown in 1947; three prototypes built.
- Sud-Ouest Djinn - French tip-jet powered helicopter, first flown in 1953; 178 built.
- VFW-Fokker H3 - German tip-jet compound helicopter; two built and flown.

=== Hot tip jets ===
Hot tip jets in this context are a form of simple pressure fed rocket engine as both fuel and oxidizer are being supplied, mixed, and ignited. Typically the oxidizer used here is air that has been compressed elsewhere in the aircraft and ducted through the rotor to the tip thruster along with fuel.

- Doblhoff WNF 342 - German WWII helicopter with tip-jet rotor propulsion.
- Fairey Ultra-light Helicopter - First flew in 1955. Four built for military use but lack of interest led to Fairey concentrating on the larger Rotodyne project.
- Fairey Jet Gyrodyne - UK experimental tip-jet–powered rotor compound gyroplane, providing data for the Fairey Rotodyne. First flown in 1954.
- Fairey Rotodyne - UK compound gyroplane with rotor driven by tip jets (compressed air and fuel burnt in tip combustion chambers) for VTOL. 48-seater short-haul airliner design. First flew in 1957. Cancelled due to concern about noise of tip jets in service.
- Hughes XH-17 - US tip-jet-burner-powered flying crane (largest rotor of any type on a helicopter), cancelled due to inefficient design (range around 40 mi (64 km))
- McDonnell XV-1 - US experimental compound gyroplane. Competed with Bell XV-3 tilt-rotor. Flew in 1954, but cancelled due to insufficient advantage over contemporary helicopters.

=== Ramjets ===
- Hiller YH-32 Hornet - US ramjet helicopter, first flying 1950, 'jet jeep' had good lifting capability but was otherwise poor.
- Mil V-7 - Soviet ramjet helicopter
- Focke-Wulf Fw Triebflügel German World War II interceptor design, using ramjets - not built
- H-3 Kolibrie Dutch design of the 1950s by Nederlandse Helikopter Industrie; 11 built.

=== Pulsejets ===
- American Helicopter XH-26 Jet Jeep

=== Turbojets ===
- Hiller Air Tug

=== Rockets ===
(Note: Fuel and oxidiser supplied to combustion chambers at the rotor tips.)

- Rotary Rocket Roton ATV - US re-usable rocket concept, originally designed with rocket-tip-jet–powered rotor.

=== Unknown ===
- Sikorsky XV-2, a convertiplane using a stoppable single-blade rotor with a counterweight to provide stability, while a tip-jet arrangement would power the rotor. The rotor would be retracted into the upper fuselage when stopped, with the XV-2 then flying like a conventional aircraft on delta wings. Canceled unbuilt.

== See also ==
- Aeolipile
- Rocket engine
- Jet engine
