= NHI H-3 Kolibrie =

Netherlands helicopter design

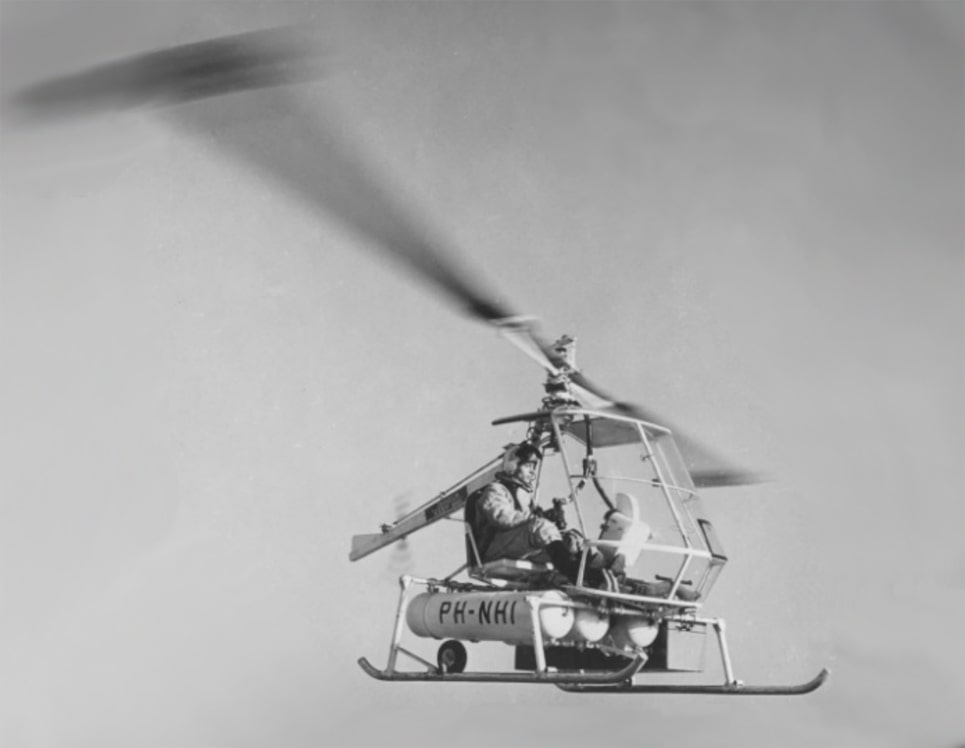
- Test flying at Zestienhoven in 1958

General information
- Type: Helicopter
- National origin: Netherlands
- Manufacturer: Nederlandse Helikopter Industrie
- Number built: 11

History
- First flight: May 1956

The NHI H-3 Kolibrie (Dutch for "Hummingbird") was a small helicopter developed in the Netherlands in the 1950s by Nederlandse Helikopter Industrie. It first flew in May 1956.

== Design ==
The H-3 was a two-seat general purpose helicopter. It had a duraluminium tube superstructure, an open cockpit and landing gear of metal skids. The design is typical of ultralight helicopters of the period, being powered by tip-jets — two ramjets, one at the tip of each rotor blade. The small tail rotor, powered by the motion of the main rotor, was necessary only for yaw control since the tip-jets eliminated the need for an anti-torque force. The ramjets could burn multiple types of fuel, giving the helicopter a certain versatility.

The Kromhout-designed-and-built ramjets generated 0.196 kN (44 lbf) thrust and made a complex gear box unnecessary. Later, Aviolanda-built ramjets generated 0.226 kN (51 lbf) thrust. In order to start the ramjets, a small 1.5 kW (2 hp) auxiliary power unit spun the main rotor to 70 rpm, at which point the ramjets could be ignited.

Variants with skis, flotation devices, and medical evacuation stretchers were developed and tested, but these versions were never produced. After developing a cropduster version, the H-3 was mainly marketed for that purpose.

== Production ==
The H-3 was assembled at Aviolanda. Subassembly took place at Aviolanda which built the fuselage and at Kromhout which built the engines. Fokker, a subcontractor to NHI, built the rotorblades. Final assembly took place at the newly opened Rotterdam Airport.

The initial production run counted ten helicopters of which the first three were used for development, testing and airworthiness tests. The second production run of ten helicopters was to be undertaken by Aviolanda after Kromhout left the joint venture. This second production run was to be equipped with an uprated ramjet. It is unsure whether the improved ramjet was ever produced.

== Commercial failure ==
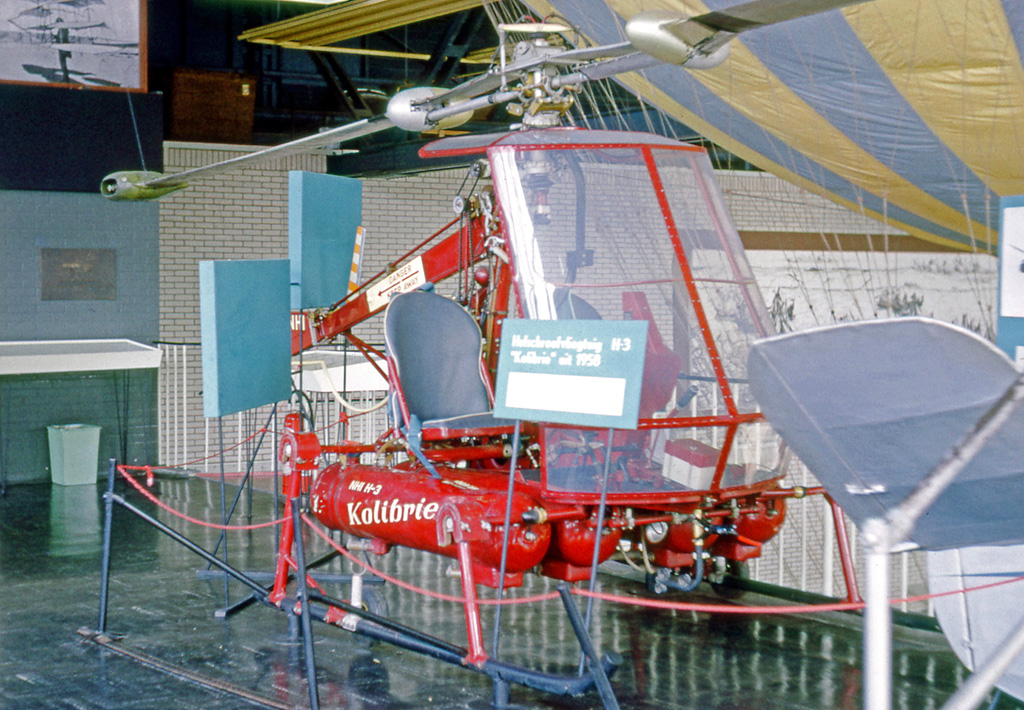
The seventh Kolibrie (manufacturers number 3007) on display at the Aviodrome museum at Schiphol Airport, Amsterdam, in 1967. Actually registered PH-NGV, it wears 'PH-NHI' markings.

Although the H-3 was considered to be a technical success, it was never successful commercially. Despite its low acquisition price, the project became a failure. Several factors contributed to this. First, the Hiller OH-23 Raven was provided to the Royal Netherlands Air Force by the United States free of charge, under the Mutual Defense Assistance Pact (MDAP). Second, NHI's two most important designers, Jan M. Drees and Gerard F. Verhage, left the company, which never recovered. Third, the ramjets not only required a great deal of development to make them viable for production, but potential buyers regarded them as unsafe. Fourth, the extraordinary fuel consumption of the ramjets made the helicopter uneconomical to operate; flight time and range were quite limited, making the helicopter unattractive for commercial or military use. Finally, the ramjets were incredibly loud: during testing, complaints were filed by people living over 5 kilometres away from the test site.

== Production list ==
Overall, nine H-3's were built between 1958 and 1959 by NHI at Rotterdam Airport when Kromhout was still a parent company. After Kromhout left, Aviolanda built another two H-3's at their Papendrecht plant.

The few production models were mainly exported to Israel, Germany, the UK and Dutch New Guinea. A few models stayed in the Netherlands.

== Specifications (H-3 Kolibrie) ==
Data from Jane's All The World's Aircraft 1961–62, Jane's All the World's Aircraft 1958-59

General characteristics

- Crew: 1
- Capacity: 1 passenger
- Length: 4.32 m (14 ft 2 in)
- Width: 2 m (6 ft 7 in) fuselage maximum
- Height: 2.75 m (9 ft 0 in)
- Empty weight: 276 kg (608 lb)
- Gross weight: 650 kg (1,433 lb)
- Max takeoff weight: 700 kg (1,543 lb)
- Fuel capacity: 440 L (116.2 US gal; 96.8 imp gal)
- Powerplant: 2 × NHI TJ-5 ramjet, 0.23 kN (51 lbf) thrust each
- Main rotor diameter: 10.06 m (33 ft 0 in)
- Main rotor area: 79.2 m^{2} (853 sq ft)

Performance

- Maximum speed: 116 km/h (72 mph, 63 kn)
- Cruise speed: 100 km/h (62 mph, 54 kn) pilot only
- Range: 75 km (47 mi, 40 nmi)
- Endurance: 65 min
- Service ceiling: 1,600 m (5,200 ft)
- Rate of climb: 6 m/s (1,200 ft/min) at 50 km/h (31 mph; 27 kn) at sea level
- Rate of descent on one engine: 10 m/s (33 ft/s)

== See also ==
- Fairey Rotodyne - a gyrodyne (jet tipped rotor driven at takeoff and landing only)
- Fairey Ultra-light Helicopter
- Rotary Rocket - with rocket tipped rotor blades
- Hiller YH-32 Hornet - another helicopter with ramjet powered rotorblades
