= NHIndustries =

European helicopter manufacturer

- Type: Joint venture
- Industry: Aerospace
- Founded: 1992; 34 years ago
- Headquarters: Aix-en-Provence, France
- Products: Helicopters
- Parent: Airbus Helicopters (62.5%); Leonardo (32%); GKN Fokker (5.5%)
- Website: nhindustries.com

NHIndustries (NHI) is a helicopter manufacturing company specifically established to be NATO Helicopter Management Agency's prime contractor for the design and development, industrialisation, production and logistic support of the NHIndustries NH90 series of helicopters. NHIndustries was established in 1992 as a partnership between Eurocopter of France and Germany (now Airbus Helicopters), Agusta of Italy (now Leonardo) and Stork Fokker Aerospace of the Netherlands (now GKN Fokker).

== History ==
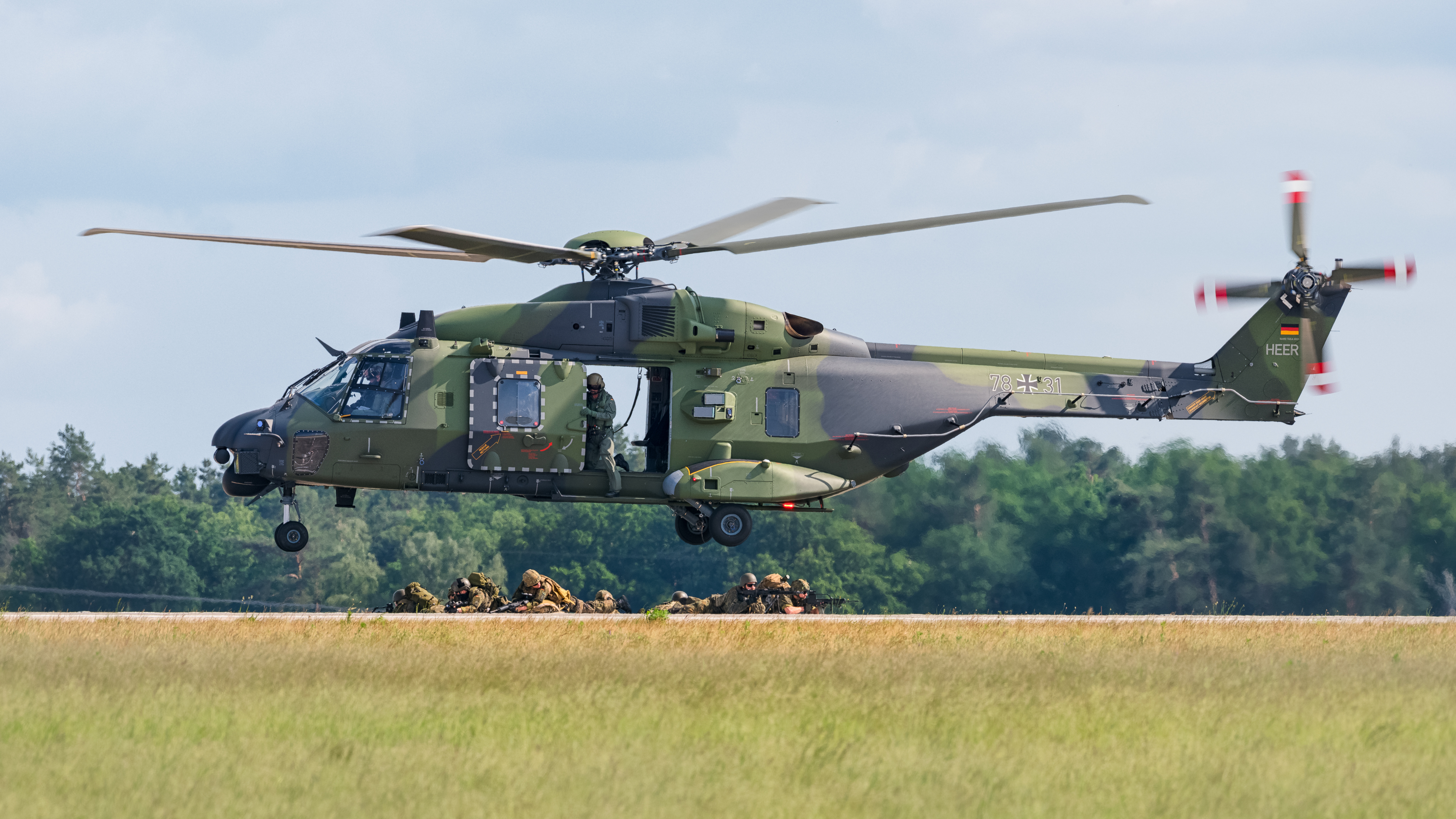
German Army NH90 at the ILA Berlin Air Show 2016

The NHIndustries NH90 is a medium-sized, twin-engine, multi-role military helicopter developed in response to NATO requirements calling for a battlefield helicopter which would also be capable of being operated in naval environments. Both development and manufacture of the rotorcraft has been principally handled by NHIndustries, a collaborative company. It is presently owned by Airbus Helicopters, Leonardo (formerly AgustaWestland) and Fokker Aerostructures.

In 1985, France, West Germany, Italy, the Netherlands, and the United Kingdom teamed to develop a NATO battlefield transport and anti-ship/anti-submarine helicopter for the 1990s. The United Kingdom left the team in 1987. On 1 September 1992, NH Industries signed an NH90 design-and-development contract with NAHEMA (NATO Helicopter Management Agency). This agency represented the four participating nations: France, Germany, Italy, and the Netherlands. Portugal later joined the agency in June 2001.

Design work on the helicopter started in 1993. The first prototype, PT1, made the type's first flight on 18 December 1995. The second prototype, PT2, first flew on 19 March 1997 and the third prototype, PT3, on 27 November 1998. On 12 December 2002, PT3 became the first helicopter to fly exclusively with fly-by-wire controls following the removal of mechanical back-up controls.

The NH90 was developed into two main variants: the Tactical Transport Helicopter (TTH) and the NATO Frigate Helicopter (NFH). These two main variants share about 75% commonality with each other. Many of the operators have requested specific configurations to their own helicopter fleets, thus each nation's NH90 is effectively customized to the end-user's requirements. During the development phase of the programme in the 1990s, both technical and funding problems were experienced. In June 2000, the partner nations placed a large production order for the type, valued at US$8.6 billion, for a total of 366 helicopters. Additional orders have since followed from customers in Europe, Asia, and Australia. By April 2013, a total of 529 NH90s of all variants were on order by various customers.

The NH90 was initially intended to be produced at three exporting final assembly lines (FAL); Cascina Costa in Italy for AgustaWestland, Marignane in France and Donauwörth in Germany for Airbus Helicopters. The Nordic and Australian contracts stipulated production locally (the Nordic ones at Patria in Finland and the Australian ones in Brisbane). Spain has a final assembly line at Albacete. The Marignane assembly line can reportedly complete up to 22 NH90s per year.

The production responsibilities were divided amongst the major sections/components amongst each of the shareholding companies:

- Airbus Helicopters France 31.25% (Engines, Rotors, the Electrical, flight control and the core avionics systems)
- Airbus Helicopters Deutschland 31.25% (Forward and centre fuselage, the fuel, communications and avionics control systems)
- Fokker 5.5% (Tail structure, doors, sponsons, landing gear and the intermediate gearbox)
- AgustaWestland 32% (Rear fuselage, main gearbox, hydraulic system, automatic flight control and plant management systems, power plant and the NFH mission system)

Once fabricated, items are shipped from these companies to the six final assembly facilities, at Marignane, France; Tessera, Italy; Donauwörth, Germany; Halli, Finland; and Brisbane, Australia.

During 2007, the NH90 first entered operational service with the German Army. During April 2010, the Royal Netherlands Navy was the first customer to receive the navalised NH90 NFH variant. In order to speed up delivery and reduce the complexity of manufacturing a large number of variants, NH Industries proposed the adoption of a simplified baseline airframe which could be configured to the individual customer's requirements. Between 2004 and 2016, the production lead times for the NH90 had reduced from 18 months to 7.5 months. During 2014, worldwide production of the NH90 peaked at 53 helicopters. By January 2017, the NH90 had logged 127,000 flight hours in the armed forces of thirteen nations.

== See also ==
- Nederlandse Helikopter Industrie
