= McDonnell XV-1 =

American experimental gyrodyne

XV-1
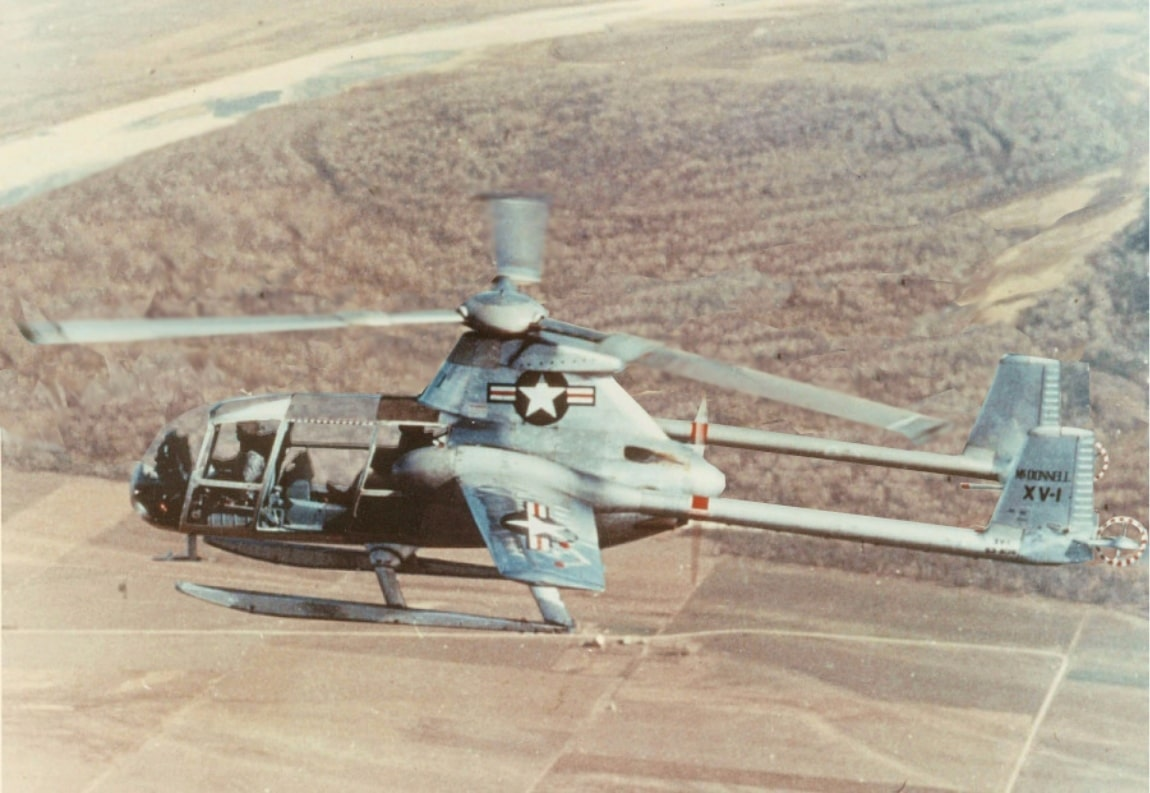

General information
- Type: Convertiplane
- Manufacturer: McDonnell Aircraft
- Number built: 2

History
- First flight: 14 July 1954

The McDonnell XV-1 is an experimental Convertiplane developed by McDonnell Aircraft for a joint research program between the United States Air Force and the United States Army to explore technologies to develop an aircraft that could take off and land like a helicopter but fly at faster airspeeds, similar to a conventional airplane. The XV-1 would reach a speed of 200 mph (320 km/h; 170 kn), faster than any previous rotorcraft, but the program was terminated due to the tip-jet noise and complexity of the technology which gave only a modest gain in performance.

== Development ==
In 1951, the Air Force announced a competition to develop a compound helicopter, an aircraft that could take off and land vertically, like a helicopter, but could cruise at higher airspeeds than conventional helicopters. The joint research program was being conducted by the Air Force's Research and Development Command and the Army's Transportation Corps. Bell Aircraft submitted the design for the XV-3, Sikorsky Aircraft submitted the S-57, a retracting rotor design, and McDonnell submitted a design modified from its Model M-28 design.

On 20 June 1951, the Air Force and Army signed a Letter of Intent with McDonnell to award a contract to develop an aircraft based on their design. McDonnell benefited from previous design work on the Model M-28 and had a complete mockup ready for inspection by the Army and Air Force by November 1951. McDonnell was given approval to begin fabrication of what was then designated the XL-25 ("L" for Liaison). As the aircraft was being constructed the designation was changed to XH-35. Finally, the aircraft became the first vehicle in the convertiplane series as the XV-1.

The basic airframe came from an early post-World War II commercial airplane program for a four-place airplane in the Bonanza and Navion class. McDonnell enlisted Kurt Hohenemser and Friedrich von Doblhoff, the Austrian helicopter designer of the WNF 342, to provide technical direction in developing the tip-jet driven rotor system. After 22 months of fabrication, the first aircraft (serial 53-4016) was ready for flight testing by early 1954.

== Design ==
Built mostly from aluminum, the XV-1 fuselage consisted of a streamlined tube mounted on skid landing gear, with a rear-mounted engine and a pusher propeller. It also had tapered stub wings mounted high on the fuselage. In turn, twin tailbooms and twin vertical surfaces, interconnected by a horizontal stabilizer elevator, were mounted to the wings. A three-bladed main rotor powered by blade tip pressure jets was mounted on top of the fuselage, above the wing roots.

The convertiplane featured a single Continental-built R-975 radial piston engine that powered twin air compressors. These forced high-pressure air through piping in the rotor blades to a combustion chamber on each of the three rotor tips, where a burner ignited fuel for increased thrust, which drove the rotors around and allowed the aircraft to fly like a conventional helicopter. For horizontal flight, the engine was disconnected from the compressors and drove the two-bladed pusher propeller instead. During forward flight the wing provided 80% of the lift with the remainder generated by the main rotor autorotating at about 50% of normal rpm. When in hover mode, the rotor turned at 410 RPM but slowed to 180 RPM for high-speed flight above 125 knots (144 mph; 232 km/h).

The cabin was covered almost entirely with Plexiglas windows providing visibility in all directions except directly underneath the aircraft. The cockpit consisted of tandem pilot and copilot stations, or the aircraft could accommodate a pilot and three passengers, or a pilot and two stretchers.

== Operational history ==
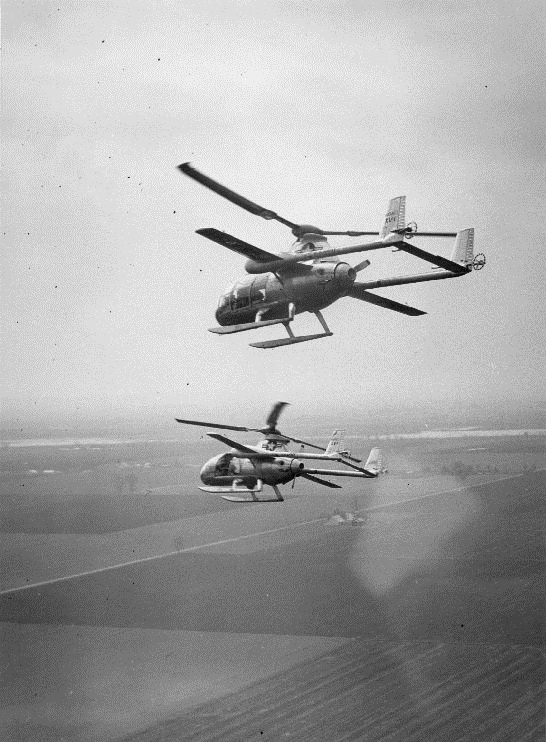
The two XV-1s

The XV-1 began tethered hovering flight tests on 11 February 1954, with test pilot John R. Noll. The tether had lead weights intended to keep the aircraft in ground effect until issues with the rotor's tip-jet propulsion system were solved. On 14 July 1954, the lead weights were removed and the XV-1 conducted its first free hovering flight. As flight testing continued, McDonnell completed the second machine (s/n 53-4017).

The second aircraft was modified from the original XV-1 in an attempt to reduce parasitic drag during high-speed forward flight. To achieve this end, the rotor pylon was reduced and the undercarriage was streamlined as well as strengthened. The second XV-1 also featured two small tail rotors mounted on the outboard side at the end of each tailboom. These were a result of the hover test flights by Noll who remarked on the lack of yaw authority when using rudders only. The original XV-1 would later be modified with the tail rotors.

By the spring of 1955, the second XV-1 was ready to join the flight program. On 29 April 1955, the XV-1 made its first transition from vertical to horizontal flight, and on 10 October 1955, the second XV-1 became the first rotorcraft to exceed 200 mph (320 km/h; 170 kn), nearly 45 mph (72 km/h; 39 kn) faster than the helicopter speed record at the time. The XV-1 achieved a mu (the ratio of airspeed to rotor tip speed) of 0.95.

After three years and nearly 600 hours between the two aircraft, the XV-1 contract was canceled in 1957. Ultimately, it was determined that the XV-1's convertiplane configuration was too complex for the small advantages gained over conventional helicopters. The piston engine could not produce enough power to optimize the design advantages. Technological advances in conventional helicopter rotor design and engines in the following years would eventually negate the XV-1's performance margin. The noise level was 116 dB in the cockpit, but even higher for ground personnel who described the tip jet noise as "extremely irritating" and the noise level was still 90 dB 1/2 mile (0.80 km) away. McDonnell would try to capitalize on the tip-jet rotor technology with a small crane helicopter design, designated Model 120 and first flown on 13 November 1957.

== Surviving aircraft ==
The Army retained 53-4016, which was transferred to the United States Army Aviation Museum at Fort Novosel, Alabama. 53-4017, the record-setting second prototype, was donated by the Army to the Smithsonian Institution's National Air and Space Museum, Washington, D.C., in 1964.

== Specifications (XV-1) ==
Data from Harding

General characteristics

- Crew: One (pilot)
- Capacity: two passengers, or two litters
- Length: 50 ft 5 in (15.37 m)
- Wingspan: 26 ft 0 in (7.92 m)
- Empty weight: 4,277 lb (1,940 kg)
- Gross weight: 5,505 lb (2,497 kg)
- Powerplant: 1 × Continental R-975-19 radial piston engine, 525 hp (391 kW)
- Main rotor diameter: 31 ft (9.4 m)

Performance

- Maximum speed: 203 mph (327 km/h, 176 kn)
- Cruise speed: 138 mph (222 km/h, 120 kn)
- Range: 593 mi (954 km, 515 nmi)
- Service ceiling: 19,800 ft (6,000 m)
- Rate of climb: 1,300 ft/min (6.6 m/s)

== See also ==
Aircraft of comparable role, configuration, and era

- Bell XV-3
- Fairey Jet Gyrodyne
- CarterCopter
