= Sikorsky XV-2 =

American VTOL aircraft proposal

XV-2

General information
- Type: Stoppable rotor aircraft
- National origin: United States
- Manufacturer: Sikorsky Aircraft
- Status: Canceled
- Number built: 0

The Sikorsky XV-2, also known by the Sikorsky Aircraft model number S-57, was a planned experimental stoppable rotor aircraft, designated as a convertiplane, developed for a joint research program between the United States Air Force and the United States Army. The program was canceled before construction of the prototype began.

== Design and development ==
The XV-2 was developed as part of a joint U.S. Air Force and U.S. Army program intended to explore technologies to develop an aircraft that could take off and land like a helicopter but fly at faster airspeeds, similar to a conventional airplane. The XV-2's stoppable-rotor design was intended to allow it to hover and fly at low speed like a conventional helicopter. It utilized a single-blade single-rotor design; a counterweight provided stability to the rotor system, while a tip-jet arrangement powered the rotor, which retracted into the upper fuselage when stopped, the XV-2 then flying like a conventional aircraft on delta wings. A single jet engine was provided for forward flight, and was to be equipped with thrust vectoring for steering in hover and for anti-torque control in lieu of a tail rotor.

The XV-2 prototype was assigned the serial number 53-4403, but the project was cancelled before construction could begin.

== Specifications ==
General characteristics

- Crew: 1
- Length: 45 ft 8 in (13.92 m)
- Wingspan: 19 ft 6 in (5.94 m)
- Height: 12 ft 9 in (3.89 m)
- Powerplant: 1 × Armstrong Siddeley Mamba II or Allison 501-C1 / Pratt & Whitney JT12 turboprop / turbojet

Performance

== See also ==
Aircraft of comparable role, configuration, and era

- McDonnell XV-1
- Bell XV-3
- Sikorsky X-Wing
