= Aviolanda AT-21 =

Dutch pulsejet target drone

AT-21

General information
- Type: Target drone
- National origin: Netherlands
- Manufacturer: Aviolanda
- Primary user: Royal Netherlands Navy

History
- First flight: 1955

The Aviolanda AT-21 was a target drone developed in the Netherlands by Aviolanda. Powered by a pulsejet engine, it was the Netherlands' first drone to be successfully developed, and saw limited use in the late 1950s and early 1960s.

== Design and development ==
Developed in 1955, the AT-21 was of conventional aircraft design, with a high-mounted, constant-chord monoplane wing and a twin tail empennage. Power was provided by a SNECMA AS-11 Ecrevisse pulsejet, mounted in a fairing underneath the aircraft's fuselage; the construction of the airframe made extensive use of plastic in the nose and tail, with the center-section being of metal construction, and the wings and tail were made of foam-filled plastic with metal stabilizers and rudders.

Launch was by JATO-type booster rockets from a zero-length launch ramp; a trolley for conventional takeoff from a runway was also available. Control was by radio commands from a remote guidance station, set up like an aircraft cockpit; if radio contact was lost, the parachute recovery system would automatically deploy. The parachutes could also be manually released at the end of a mission; the wing and tail would be separated by explosive bolts upon landing to simplify recovery and reduce the risk of damage during the process. Endurance was up to one hour, and it was possible to fit a payload of cameras for aerial reconnaissance duties.

== Operational history ==
The first flight of the AT-21 took place in late 1955. The first Dutch drone to successfully complete development, it entered service with the Royal Dutch Navy. Production of the AT-21 continued through 1958.

== Specifications ==
Data from Ordway and Wakeford, Jane's All the World's Aircraft 1958-59

General characteristics

- Length: 5.5 m (18 ft 1 in)
- Wingspan: 3.6 m (11 ft 10 in)
- Height: 1 m (3 ft 3 in)
- Wing area: 1.44 m^{2} (15.5 sq ft)
- Empty weight: 155 kg (342 lb)
- Gross weight: 300 kg (661 lb)
- Fuel capacity: 120 L (31.7 US gal; 26.4 imp gal)
- Powerplant: 1 × SNECMA AS.11 pulsejet, 0.85 kN (190 lbf) thrust

Performance

- Maximum speed: 330 km/h (210 mph, 180 kn) at sea level

346 km/h (215 mph; 187 kn) at 3,000 m (9,800 ft)

- Cruise speed: 285 km/h (177 mph, 154 kn) at 1,500–3,000 m (4,900–9,800 ft)
- Endurance: 60-70 minutes
- Rate of climb: 6.17 m/s (1,215 ft/min) at sea level

3.17 m/s (10 ft/s) at 3,000 m (9,800 ft)

== See also ==
Aircraft of comparable role, configuration, and era

- GAF Jindivik
- Ryan Firebee
- Martin KDM Plover

Related lists

- List of unmanned aerial vehicles
