= Convertiplane =

Powered lift aircraft using rotors for both vertical and horizontal flight

A convertiplane is defined by the Fédération Aéronautique Internationale (FAI or World Air Sports Federation) as an aircraft which uses rotor power for vertical takeoff and landing (VTOL) and converts to fixed-wing lift in normal flight. In the US, it is further classified as a sub-type of powered lift. In popular usage, it sometimes includes any aircraft that converts in flight to change its method of obtaining lift.

== Types of convertiplane ==
Most convertiplanes are of the proprotor type, in which the same spinning blades are used as rotor blades for vertical flight and then pivot forward to act as propeller blades in horizontal flight. Proprotor types may be of either tilt rotor or tilt wing configuration. Tiltwing mechanisms tends to be more complicated. As with the helicopter, an engine failure could be disastrous even in the case of a cross-coupled twin rotor configuration.

The stopped rotor type has a separate system for forward thrust. It takes off like a helicopter but for forward flight the rotor stops and acts as a fixed wing. The gyrocopter is similar except that the rotor continues to spin and to generate a significant amount of lift, and so is classed as a rotorcraft and not a convertiplane.

=== Tiltrotor ===
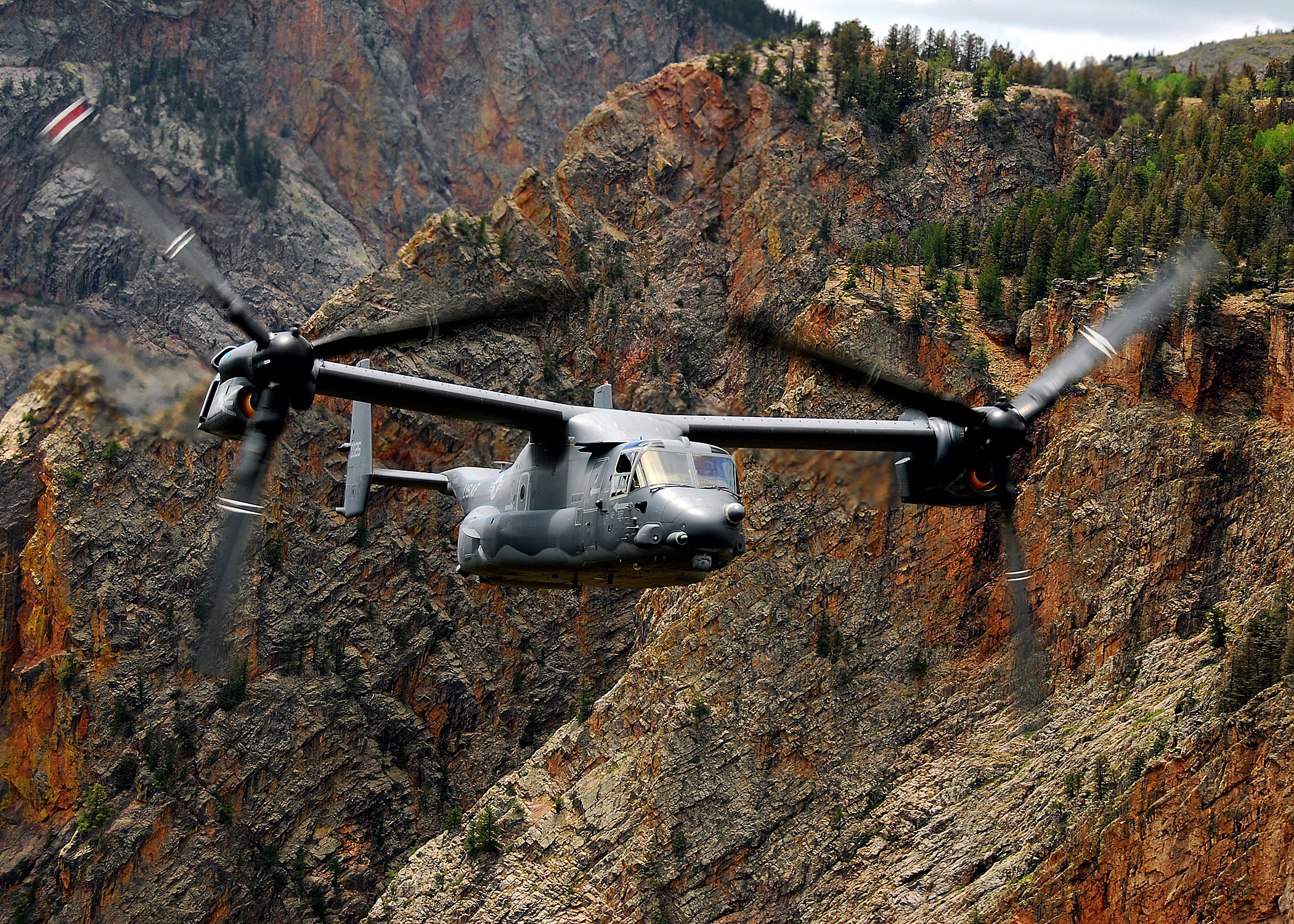
A USAF CV-22 in flight

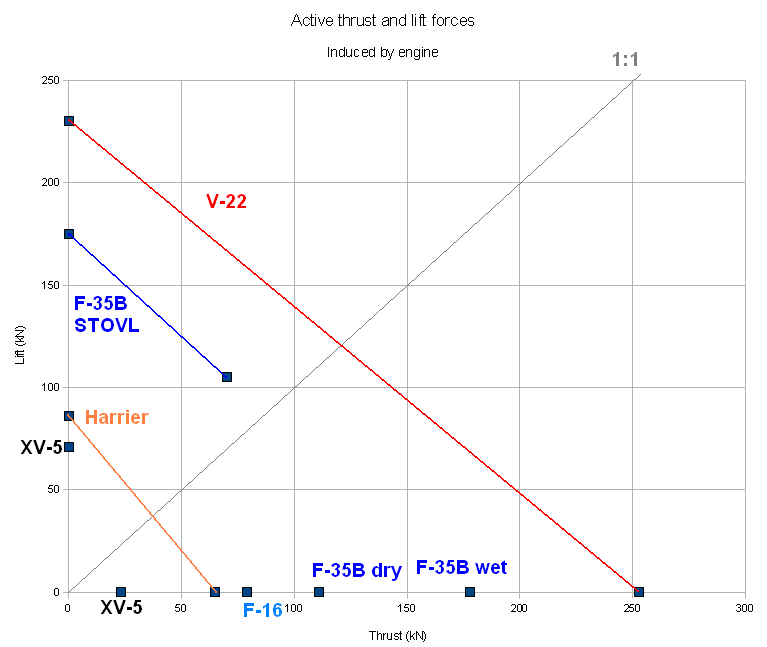
Powered lift and thrust forces of various aircraft

The powered rotors of a tiltrotor (sometimes called proprotor) are mounted on rotating shafts or nacelles at the end of a fixed wing, and used for both lift and propulsion. For vertical flight, the rotors are angled to provide thrust upwards, lifting the way a helicopter rotor does. As the aircraft gains speed, the rotors progressively rotate or tilt forward, with the rotors eventually becoming perpendicular to the fuselage of the aircraft, similar to a propeller. In this mode, the wing provides the lift and the rotor provides thrust. The wing's greater efficiency helps the tiltrotor achieve higher speeds than helicopters.

The Bell Boeing V-22 Osprey has two turbine engines, each driving a three-bladed rotor. The rotors function similar to a helicopter in vertical flight, and similar to an airplane in forward flight. It first flew on 19 March 1989. The AgustaWestland AW609 (formerly Bell/Agusta BA609) tiltrotor is a civilian aircraft based on the V-22 Osprey. The aircraft can take off and land vertically with 2 crew and 9 passengers. The aircraft was expected to be certified by the mid 2020s. In February 2023, test pilots from the US Federal Aviation Administration (FAA) flew the AW609 tiltrotor for the first time in a pre-Type Inspection Authorization activity. New codes were due to be developed to cover the transition phase between the two modes.

=== Tiltwing ===
The tiltwing is similar to the tiltrotor, except that the rotor mountings are fixed to the wing and the whole assembly tilts between vertical and horizontal positions.

The Vertol VZ-2 was a research aircraft developed in the late 1950s. Unlike other tiltwing aircraft, Vertol designed the VZ-2 using rotors in place of propellers. On 23 July 1958, the aircraft made its first full transition from vertical flight to horizontal flight. By the time the aircraft was retired in 1965, the VZ-2 had accomplished 450 flights, including 34 full transitions.

=== Stopped rotor ===
A stopped rotor rotates like a conventional lifting rotor for takeoff and landing, but stops for retraction or to act as a fixed wing in forward flight. None has yet been successful.

The Sikorsky XV-2 had a single-bladed rotor that would have retracted into the aircraft. It was not built.

The Sikorsky X-Wing had a four-bladed rotor utilizing compressed air to control lift over the surfaces while operating as a helicopter. At higher forward speeds, the rotor would be stopped to continue providing lift as tandem wings in an X configuration. The program was canceled before the aircraft had attempted any flights with the rotor system.

The Boeing X-50 Dragonfly had a two-bladed rotor driven by the engine for takeoff. In horizontal flight the rotor stopped to act like a wing. Fixed canard and tail surfaces provided lift during transition, and also stability and control in forward flight. Both examples of this aircraft were destroyed in crashes.

== History ==
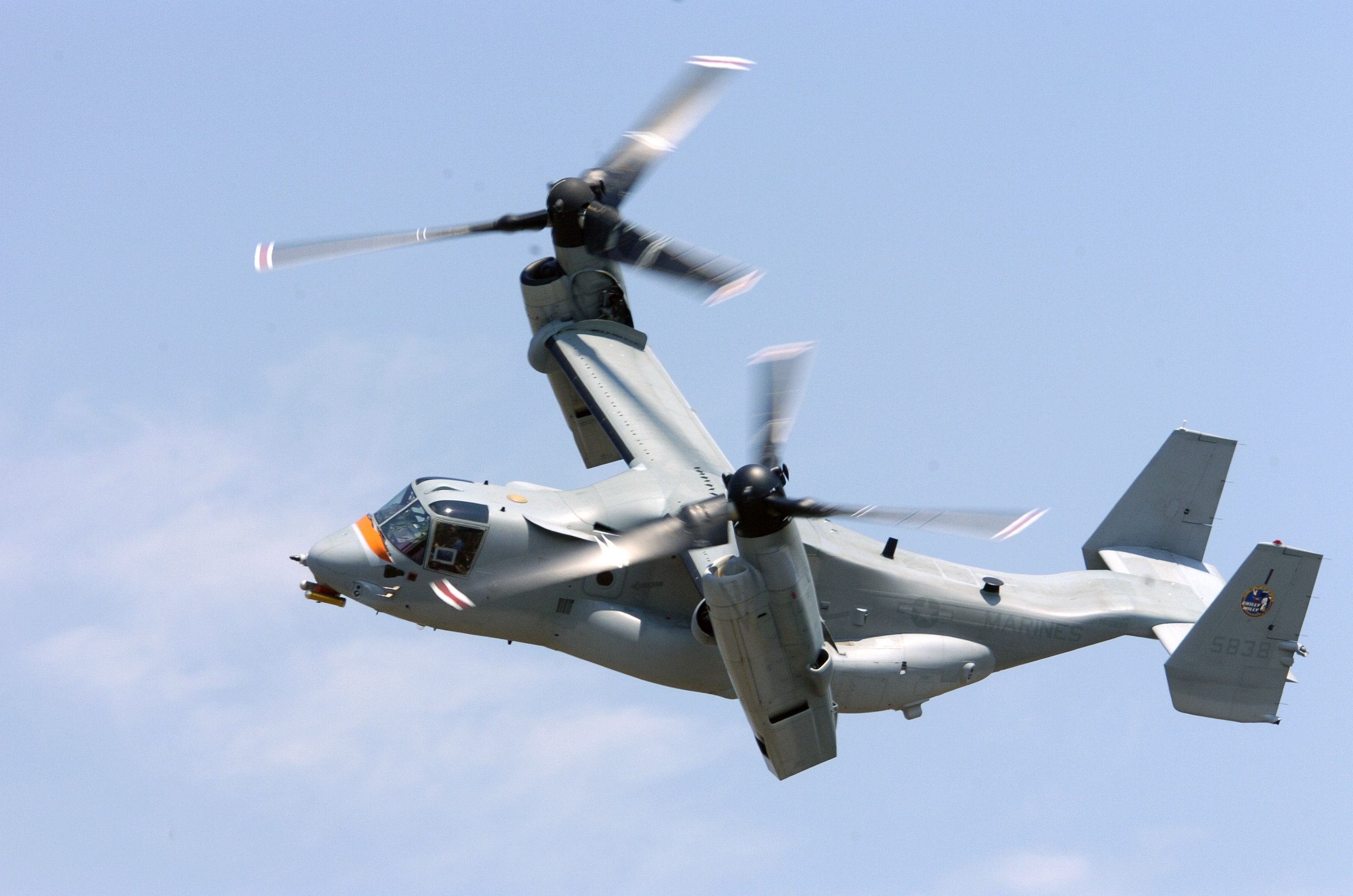
A Bell Boeing V-22 Osprey tiltrotor in flight during 2005

Convertiplanes have appeared only occasionally in the course of aviation history.

In 1920, Frank Vogelzang filed a patent for a convertiplane, but the design was never constructed. Between 1937 and 1939, the British designer L.E. Baynes developed a proposal for his Heliplane, a tiltrotor convertiplane having two tilting wingtip-mounted nacelles containing the engines, proprotor mounting and main undercarriage. The wheels did not retract but were partially covered and protruded from the rear of the nacelles when in forward flight. The proposed engines were of an unusual hybrid gas turbine design, in which the proprotor was driven off a gas turbine supplied in turn by a free-piston hot gas generator. Baynes was refused official backing and the type was never built. The basic design would not be revisited for some 20 years or so, and would eventually become the basis of the successful Bell-Boeing V-22 Osprey.

Pioneer of flight Richard Pearse worked on convertiplanes in the 1930s and 1940s. His design resembled an autogyro or helicopter, but involved a tilting propeller/rotor and monoplane wings, which, along with the tail, could fold to allow storage in a conventional garage. He intended the vehicle for driving on the road (like a car) as well for flying.

In 1950s, the concept gained brief attention in United States as an intended improvement of helicopters, but the experimental McDonnell XV-1 and Bell XV-3 did not enter production.

The Bell Boeing V-22 Osprey tiltrotor is thus far the only example to enter production. It entered service with the United States military in 2007. The design indirectly derives from Bell's work on the XV-3 and XV-15.

== See also ==
- List of aviation, avionics, aerospace and aeronautical abbreviations
- Index of aviation articles
- Autogyro
- Gyrodyne
- Tailsitter

== Notes ==
=== Bibliography ===
- Harris, Franklin D. An Overview of Autogyros and the McDonnell XV–1 Convertiplane NASA, 2003. Mirror1, Mirror2. Size: 284 pages in 13MB
- Robb, Raymond L. Hybrid helicopters: Compounding the quest for speed, Vertiflite. Summer 2006. American Helicopter Society.
