= Dornier Do 132 =

Do 132
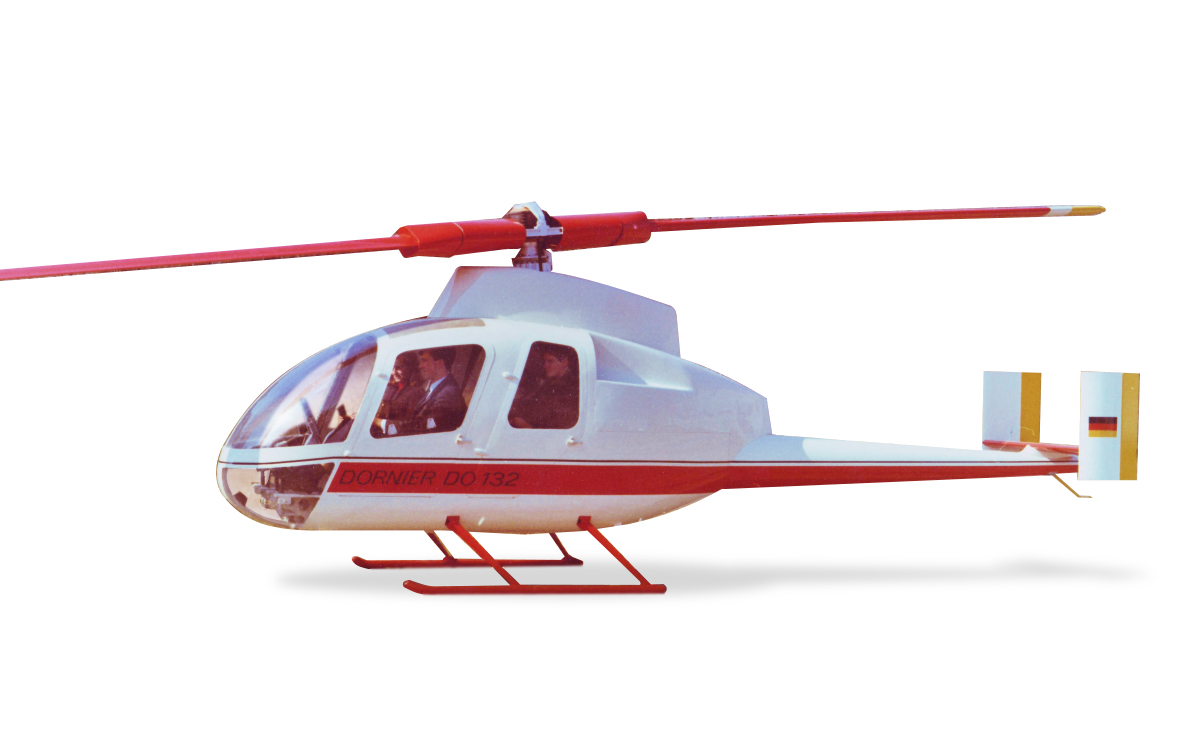
- Do 132 mockup

General information
- Type: Utility helicopter
- Manufacturer: Dornier
- Status: Canceled project

The Dornier Do 132 was a utility helicopter under development in Germany in the late 1960s. While the design was a conventional pod-and-boom layout, the propulsion system was unusual in that it used a turbine engine, not to drive the rotor directly, but to provide a source of hot gas that was fed through the rotor shaft, along the blades, and out through tip jets. The intention was to eliminate the weight and mechanical complexity of a gearbox and an anti-torque system for the tail.

This engine system underwent extensive static tests while a full-size mockup was built to prove the aerodynamics in a wind tunnel. Ultimately, however, the programme was cancelled in 1971 before a prototype was actually constructed.

== Specifications (as designed) ==
Data from Jane's All the World's Aircraft 1969–70

General characteristics

- Crew: 1
- Capacity: 4 passengers
- Length: 7.50 m (24 ft 7 in)
- Height: 2.80 m (9 ft 2 in)
- Empty weight: 675 kg (1,488 lb)
- Gross weight: 1,430 kg (3,153 lb)
- Max takeoff weight: 1,650 kg (3,638 lb)
- Powerplant: 1 × Pratt & Whitney Canada PT6-A20 gas generator, 540 kW (720 shp)
- Main rotor diameter: 10.70 m (35 ft 1 in)
- Main rotor area: 89.9 m^{2} (968 sq ft)

Performance

- Maximum speed: 229 km/h (142 mph, 124 kn)
- Cruise speed: 221 km/h (137 mph, 119 kn)
- Range: 450 km (280 mi, 240 nmi)
