= Rotorcraft =

Heavier-than-air aircraft with rotating wings

External videos
- StopRotor video

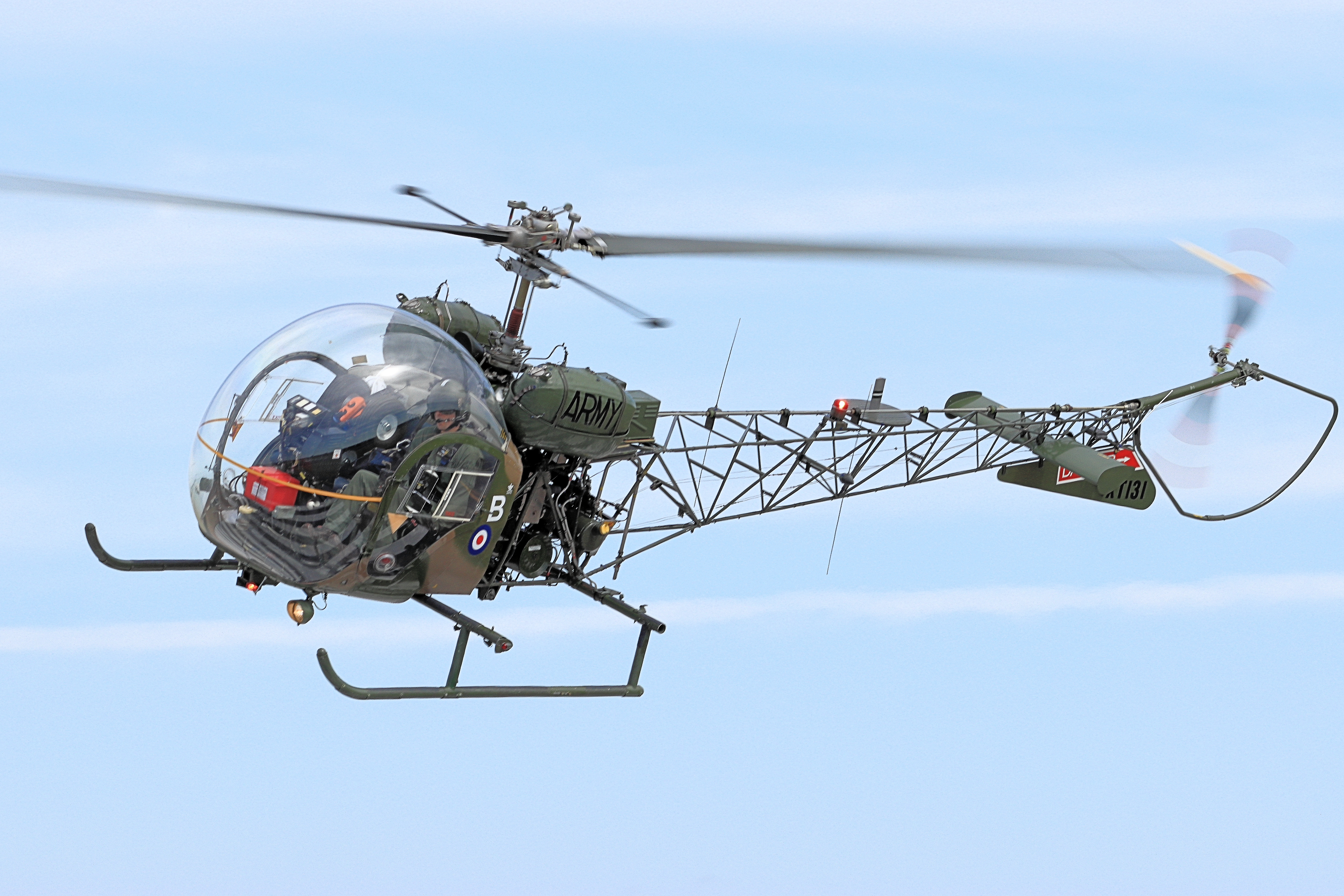
A Bell H-13 Sioux helicopter, an early example of a powered rotorcraft

A rotary-wing aircraft, rotorwing aircraft or rotorcraft is a heavier-than-air aircraft with rotary wings that spin around a vertical mast to generate lift. (Note: Part 1 (Definitions and Abbreviations) of Subchapter A of Chapter I of the U.S. Federal Aviation Regulations (Title 14 of the U.S. Code of Federal Regulations Federal Aviation Regulations) states that rotorcraft "means a heavier-than-air aircraft that depends principally for its support in flight on the lift generated by one or more rotors.") (Note: The International Civil Aviation Organization (ICAO) defines a rotorcraft as "supported in flight by the reactions of the air on one or more rotors".) The assembly of several rotor blades mounted on a single mast is referred to as a rotor.

Rotorcraft generally include aircraft where one or more rotors provide lift throughout the entire flight, such as helicopters, gyroplanes, autogyros, and gyrodynes. Compound rotorcraft augment the rotor with additional thrust engines, propellers, or static lifting surfaces. Some types, such as helicopters, are capable of vertical takeoff and landing. An aircraft which uses rotor lift for vertical flight but changes to solely fixed-wing lift in horizontal flight is not a rotorcraft but a convertiplane.

== Classes of rotorcraft ==
=== Helicopter ===
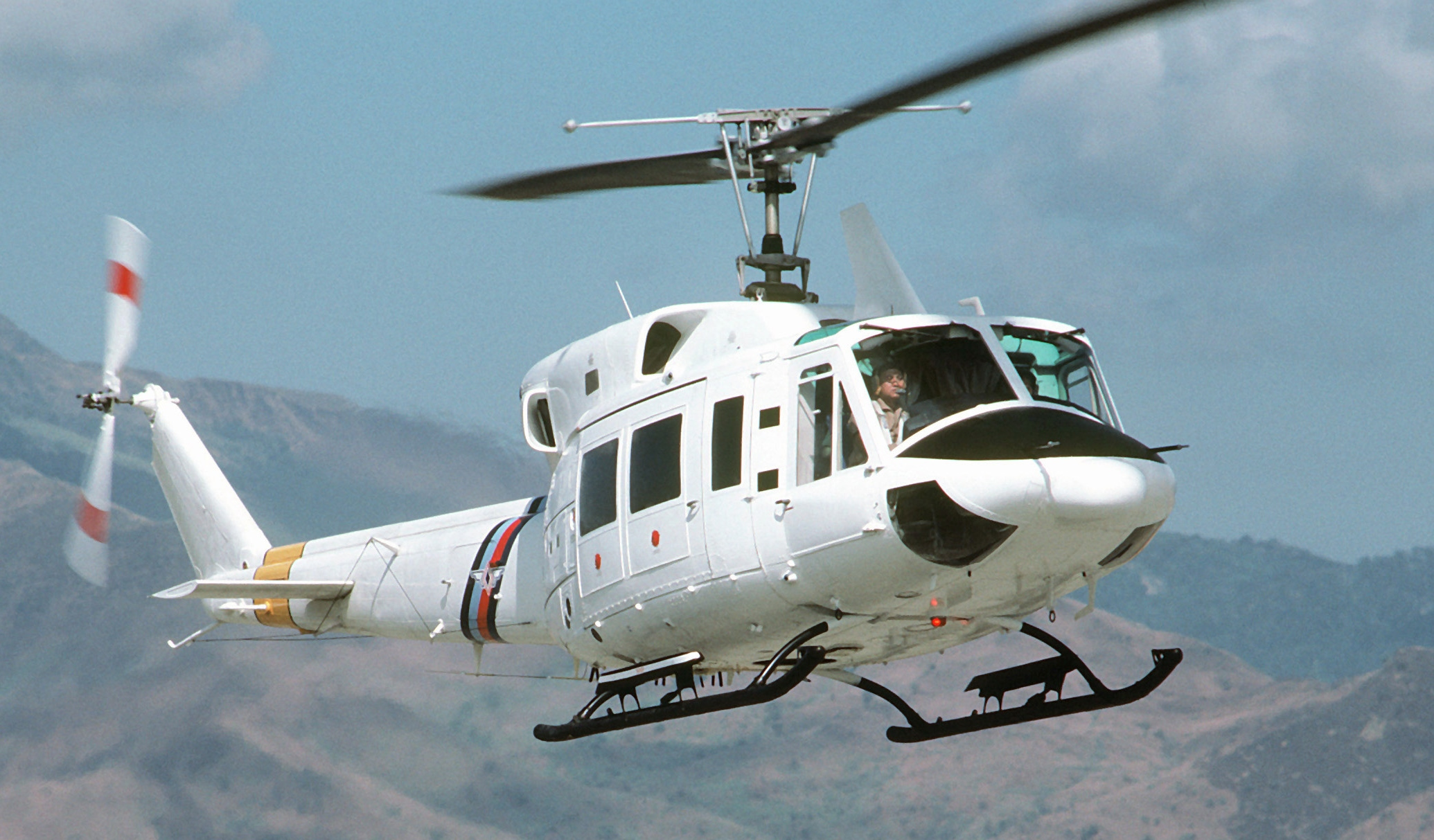
A Bell UH-1 Iroquois helicopter

A helicopter is a powered rotorcraft with rotors driven by the engine(s) throughout the flight, allowing it to take off and land vertically, hover, and fly forward, backward, or laterally. Helicopters have several different configurations of one or more main rotors.

Helicopters with a single shaft-driven main lift rotor require some sort of antitorque device such as a tail rotor, fantail, or NOTAR, except some rare examples of helicopters using tip jet propulsion, which generates almost no torque.

=== Autogyro ===
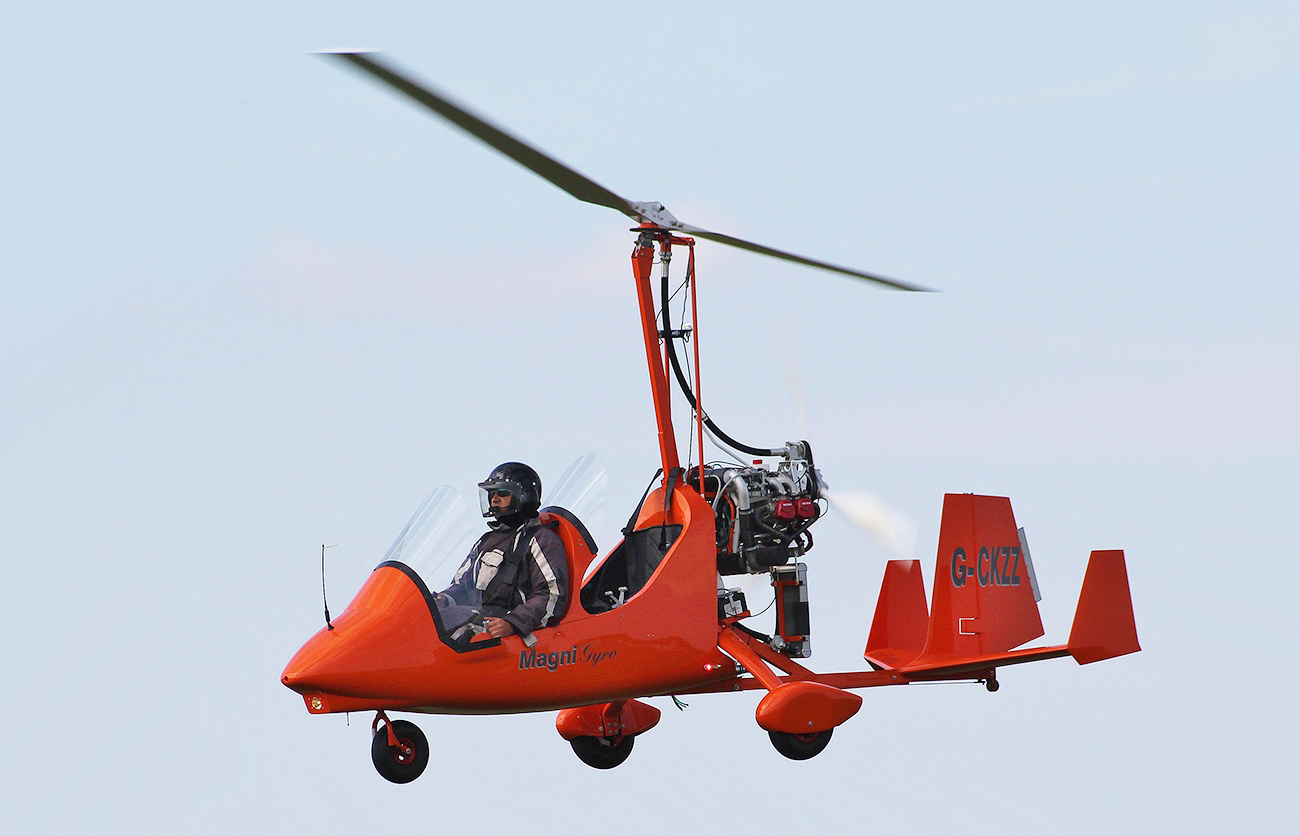
A Magni M-16 Tandem Trainer autogyro

An autogyro (sometimes called gyrocopter, gyroplane, or rotaplane) uses an unpowered rotor, driven by aerodynamic forces in a state of autorotation to develop lift, and an engine-powered propeller, similar to that of a fixed-wing aircraft, to provide thrust. While similar to a helicopter rotor in appearance, the autogyro's rotor must have air flowing up and through the rotor disk in order to generate rotation. Early autogyros resembled the fixed-wing aircraft of the day, with wings and a front-mounted engine and propeller in a tractor configuration to pull the aircraft through the air. Late-model autogyros feature a rear-mounted engine and propeller in a pusher configuration.

The autogyro was invented in 1920 by Juan de la Cierva. The autogyro with pusher propeller was first tested by Etienne Dormoy with his Buhl A-1 Autogyro.

=== Gyrodyne ===
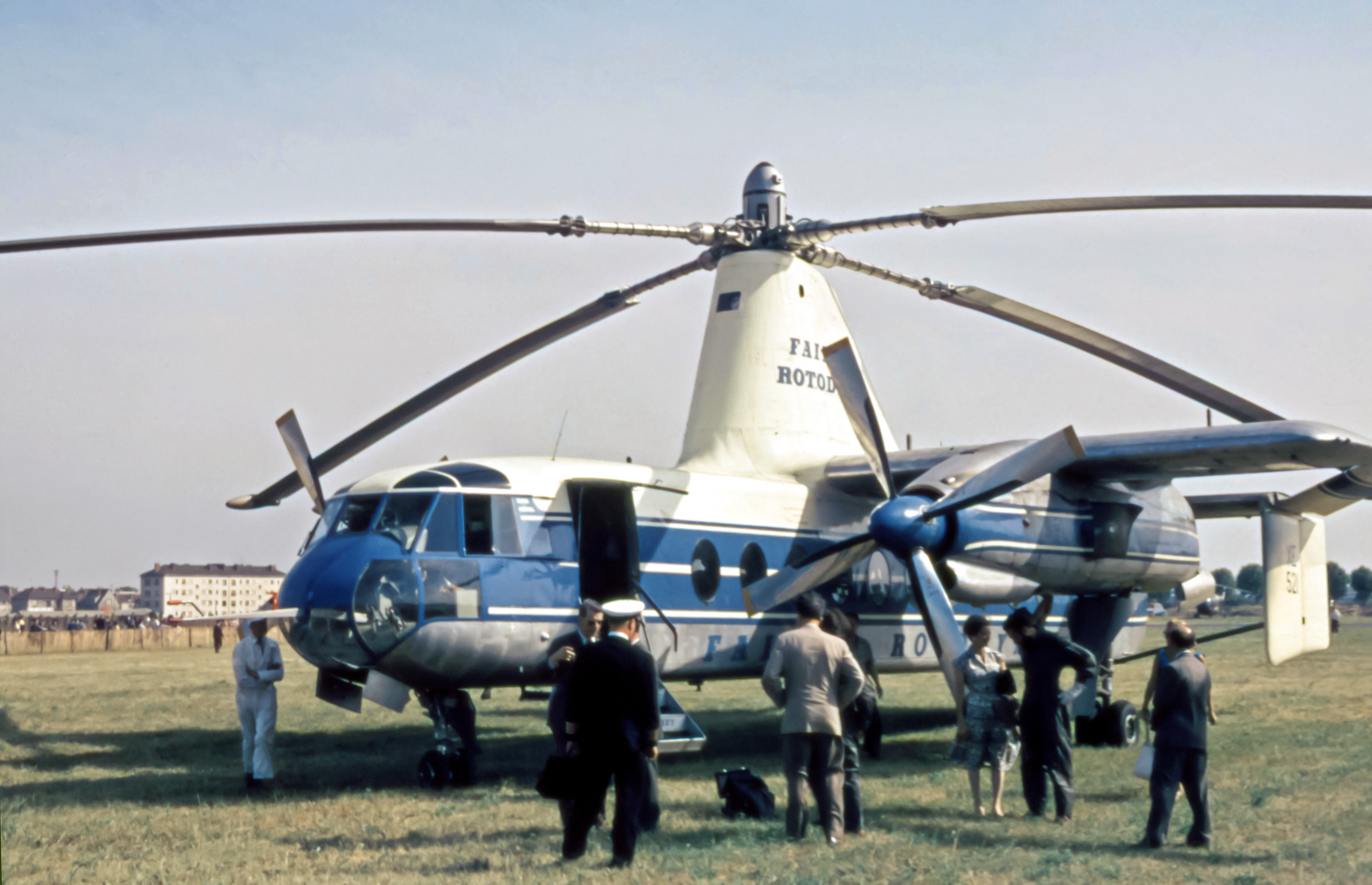
A Fairey Rotodyne prototype gyrodyne

The rotor of a gyrodyne is normally driven by its engine for takeoff and landing – hovering like a helicopter – with anti-torque and propulsion for forward flight provided by one or more propellers mounted on short or stub wings. As power is increased to the propeller, less power is required by the rotor to provide forward thrust resulting in reduced pitch angles and rotor blade flapping. At cruise speeds with most or all of the thrust being provided by the propellers, the rotor receives power only sufficient to overcome the profile drag and maintain lift. The effect is a rotorcraft operating in a more efficient manner than the freewheeling rotor of an autogyro in autorotation, minimizing the adverse effects of retreating blade stall of helicopters at higher airspeeds.

=== Rotor kite ===
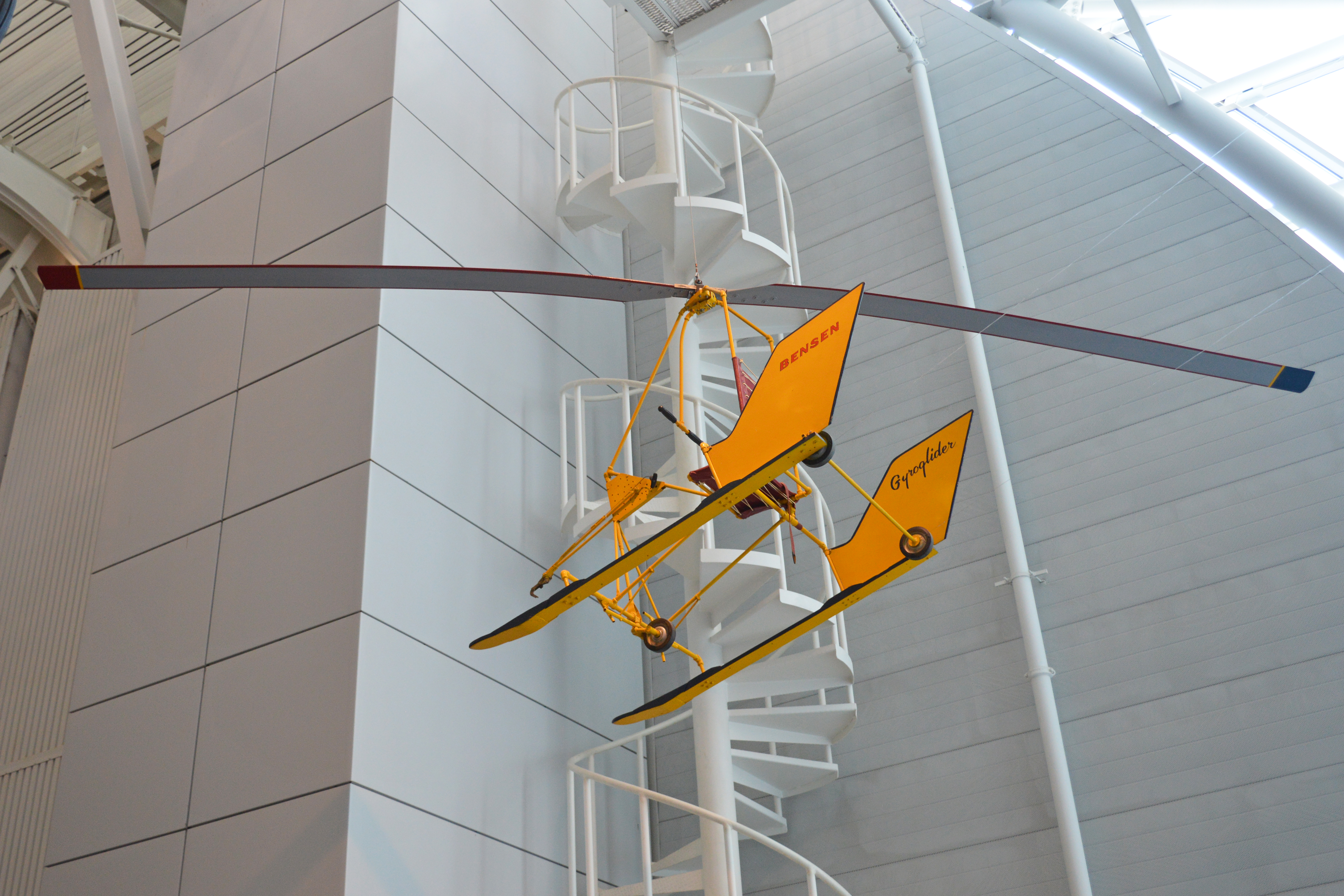
A Bensen B-6 rotor kite

A rotor kite or gyroglider is an unpowered rotary-wing aircraft. Like an autogyro or helicopter, it relies on lift created by one or more sets of rotors in order to fly. Unlike a helicopter, autogyros and rotor kites do not have an engine powering their rotors, but while an autogyro has an engine providing forward thrust that keeps the rotor turning, a rotor kite has no engine at all, and relies on either being carried aloft and dropped from another aircraft, or by being towed into the air behind a car or boat.

== Rotor configuration ==
=== Number of blades ===
A rotary wing is characterised by the number of blades. Typically this is between two and six per driveshaft.

=== Number of rotors ===
A rotorcraft may have one or more rotors. Various rotor configurations have been used:

- One rotor. Powered rotors require compensation for the torque reaction causing yaw, except in the case of tipjet drive. One rotor rotorcraft are typically called monocopters.
- Two rotors. These typically rotate in opposite directions cancelling the torque reaction so that no tail rotor or other yaw stabiliser is needed. These rotors can be laid out as
  - Tandem – One in front of the other.
  - Transverse – Side by side.
  - Coaxial – One rotor disc above the other, with concentric drive shafts.
  - Intermeshing – Twin rotors at an acute angle from each other, whose nearly-vertical driveshafts are geared together to synchronise their rotor blades so that they intermesh, also called a synchropter.
- Three rotors. An uncommon configuration; the 1948 Cierva Air Horse had three rotors as it was not believed a single rotor of sufficient strength could be built for its size. All three rotors turned in the same direction and yaw compensation was provided by inclining each rotor axis to generate rotor thrust components that opposed torque.
- Four rotors. Also referred to as the quadcopter or quadrotor. Usually two rotors turn clockwise and two counter-clockwise.
- More than four rotors. Referred to generally as multirotors, or sometimes individually as hexacopters and octocopter, these configurations typically have matched sets of rotors turning in opposite directions. They are uncommon in full-size manned aircraft but are popular for unmanned aerial vehicles (UAVs).

== Stopped rotors ==
Some rotary wing aircraft are designed to stop the rotor for forward flight so that it then acts as a fixed wing. For vertical flight and hovering it spins to act as a rotary wing or rotor, and for forward flight at speed it stops to act as a fixed wing providing some or all of the lift required. Additional fixed wings may also be provided to help with stability and control and to provide auxiliary lift.

An early American proposal was the conversion of the Lockheed F-104 Starfighter with a triangular rotor wing. The idea was later revisited by Hughes. The Sikorsky S-72 research aircraft underwent extensive flight testing.

In 1986 the Sikorsky S-72 Rotor Systems Research Aircraft (RSRA) was fitted with a four-bladed stopped rotor, known as the X-wing. The programme was cancelled two years later, before the rotor had flown.

The later canard rotor/wing (CRW) concept added a "canard" foreplane as well as a conventional tailplane, offloading the rotor wing and providing control during forward flight. For vertical and low-speed flight, the main airfoil is tip-driven as a helicopter's rotor by exhaust from a jet engine, and there is no need for a tail rotor. In high-speed flight the airfoil is stopped in a spanwise position, as the main wing of a three-surface aircraft, and the engine exhausts through an ordinary jet nozzle. Two Boeing X-50 Dragonfly prototypes with a two-bladed rotor were flown from 2003 but the program ended after both had crashed, having failed to transition successfully.

In 2013 the US Naval Research Laboratory (NRL) published a vertical-to-horizontal flight transition method and associated technology, patented December 6, 2011, which they call the Stop-Rotor Rotary Wing Aircraft. The Australian company StopRotor Technology Pty Ltd has developed a prototype Hybrid RotorWing (HRW) craft. The design uses high alpha airflow to provide a symmetrical airflow across all the rotor blades, requiring it to drop almost vertically during transition. Inflight transition from fixed to rotary mode was demonstrated in August 2013.

Another approach proposes a tailsitter configuration in which the lifting surfaces act as a rotors during takeoff, the craft tilts over for horizontal flight and the rotor stops to act as a fixed wing.

== See also ==
- Convertiplane
- Powered lift
- Rotor wing

== Notes ==
	Aerostat	Aerodyne		
	Lift: Lighter than air gas	Lift: Fixed wing	Lift: Unpowered rotor	Lift: Powered rotor
Unpowered free flight	(Free) balloon	Glider	Helicopter, etc. in autorotation	(None – see note 2)
Tethered (static or towed)	Tethered balloon	Kite	Rotor kite	(None – see note 2)
Powered	Airship	Airplane, ornithopter, etc.	Autogyro	Gyrodyne, helicopter
