= RoboSeed Nano =

Nano
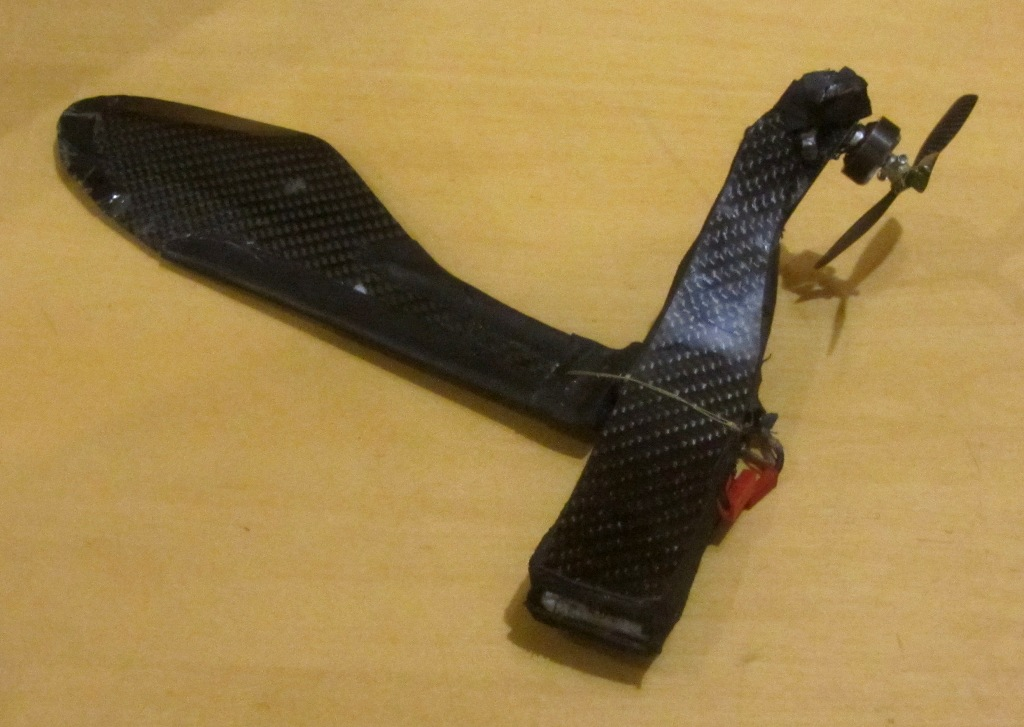
- Flying RoboSeed Nano Prototype

General information
- Type: Monocopter UAV
- National origin: United States
- Manufacturer: RoboSeed
- Designer: Evan R. Ulrich

The RoboSeed Nano is the first monocopter UAV that has demonstrated controllable flight.

== Development ==
The Nano was developed from research on flight characteristics of the Samara seed, coupled with modern small scale remote control electronics and research on controllability of monocopter vehicles. The aircraft is powered by a 2 cell 920mAh LiPoly Battery.

== Specifications (Nano) ==
Data from RoboSeed

General characteristics

- Wingspan: 1 ft (0.30 m)
- Empty weight: 0.22 lb (0.10 kg)
- Powerplant: 1 × Electric Electric

Performance

- Cruise speed: 11 kn (12 mph, 20 km/h)
- Range: 2.7 nmi (3.1 mi, 5.0 km)
- Endurance: 45 min
- Service ceiling: 5,000 ft (1,524 m) can be drop launched from higher altitude.

Avionics
Internal GPS, Altimeter, and Video
