= Avimech Dragonfly DF-1 =

American helicopter

Dragonfly DF-1

General information
- Type: Helicopter
- National origin: United States
- Manufacturer: Avimech International Aircraft, Inc.
- Status: In production (2015)

The Avimech Dragonfly DF-1 is an American helicopter produced by Avimech International Aircraft, Inc. of Tucson, Arizona. Originally developed in Switzerland, the aircraft is supplied complete and ready-to-fly.

== Design and development ==
The DF-1 was designed to comply with the US FAR 103 Ultralight Vehicles aircraft rules, including the category's maximum empty weight of 254 lb (115 kg). The aircraft has a standard empty weight of 234 lb (106 kg). It features a single main rotor and tail rotor, a single-seat, open cockpit without a windshield, skid landing gear with ground handling wheels.

The rotor is driven by tip jets fueled by hydrogen peroxide, which emits only water vapour and oxygen as exhaust products. The tail rotor is fitted only for directional control as it is not required to counteract torque, as the tip jet system does not require torque compensation.

The aircraft fuselage is made from steel and aluminum tubing. Its two-bladed rotor has a diameter of 19.7 ft (6.0 m). The aircraft has a typical empty weight of 234 lb (106 kg) and a gross weight of 794 lb (360 kg), giving a useful load of 560 lb (254 kg).

== Specifications (DF-1) ==
Data from Tacke

General characteristics

- Crew: one
- Empty weight: 234 lb (106 kg)
- Gross weight: 794 lb (360 kg)
- Fuel capacity: 18 U.S. gallons (68 L; 15 imp gal)
- Powerplant: 2 × tip jet reaction motors
- Main rotor diameter: 19 ft 8 in (6 m)
- Main rotor area: 305 sq ft (28.3 m^{2})

Performance

- Maximum speed: 115 mph (185 km/h, 100 kn)
- Cruise speed: 40 mph (65 km/h, 35 kn)
- Rate of climb: 690 ft/min (3.5 m/s)
- Disk loading: 12.7 lb/sq ft (62 kg/m^{2})

== See also ==
- List of rotorcraft
- List of aircraft (An–Az)
