= Nederlandse Helikopter Industrie =

Dutch helicopter manufacturer

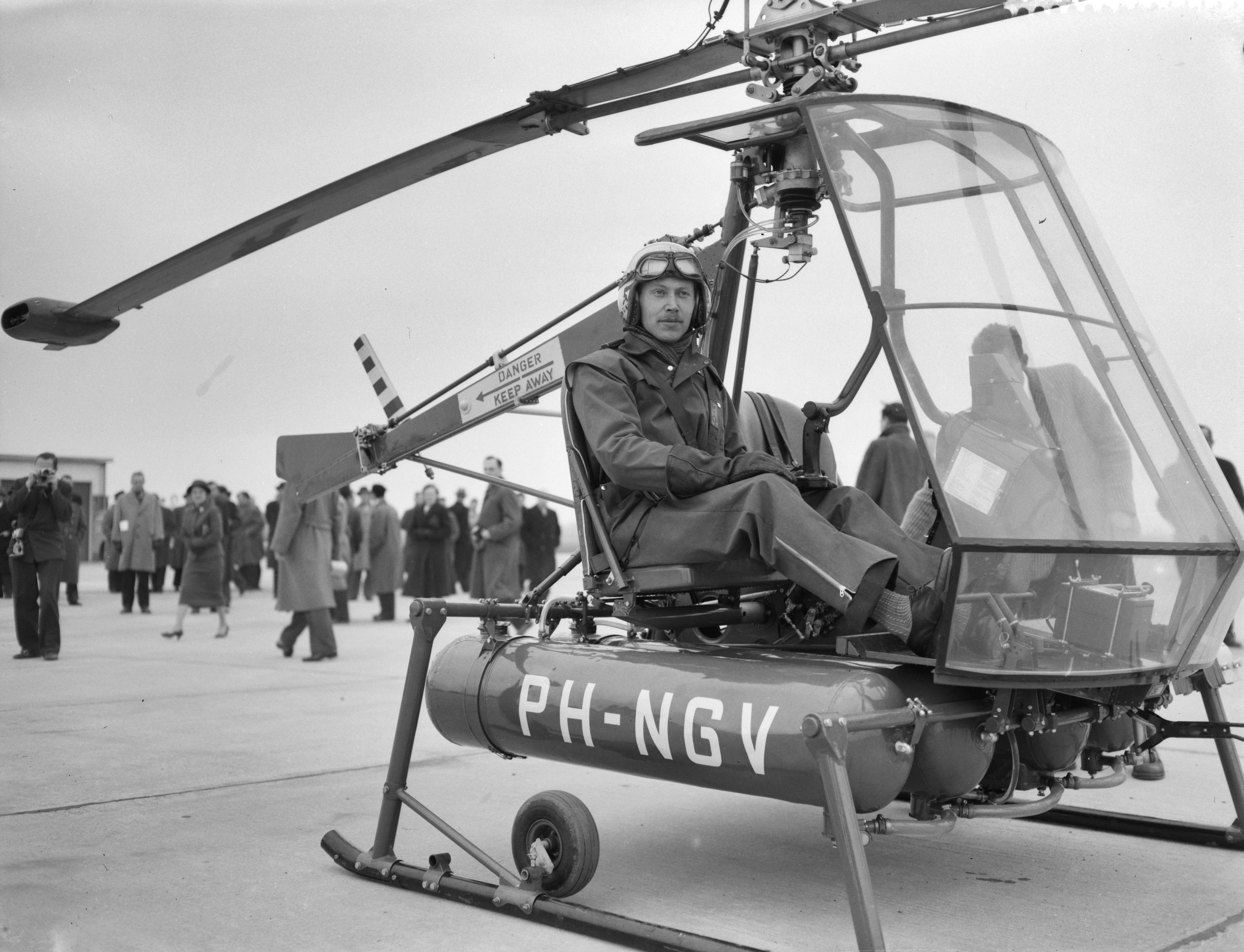
Test-flying the Kolibrie at Zestienhoven in 1958

The Nederlandse Helikopter Industrie (NHI) was a Dutch helicopter manufacturer.

== Early history ==
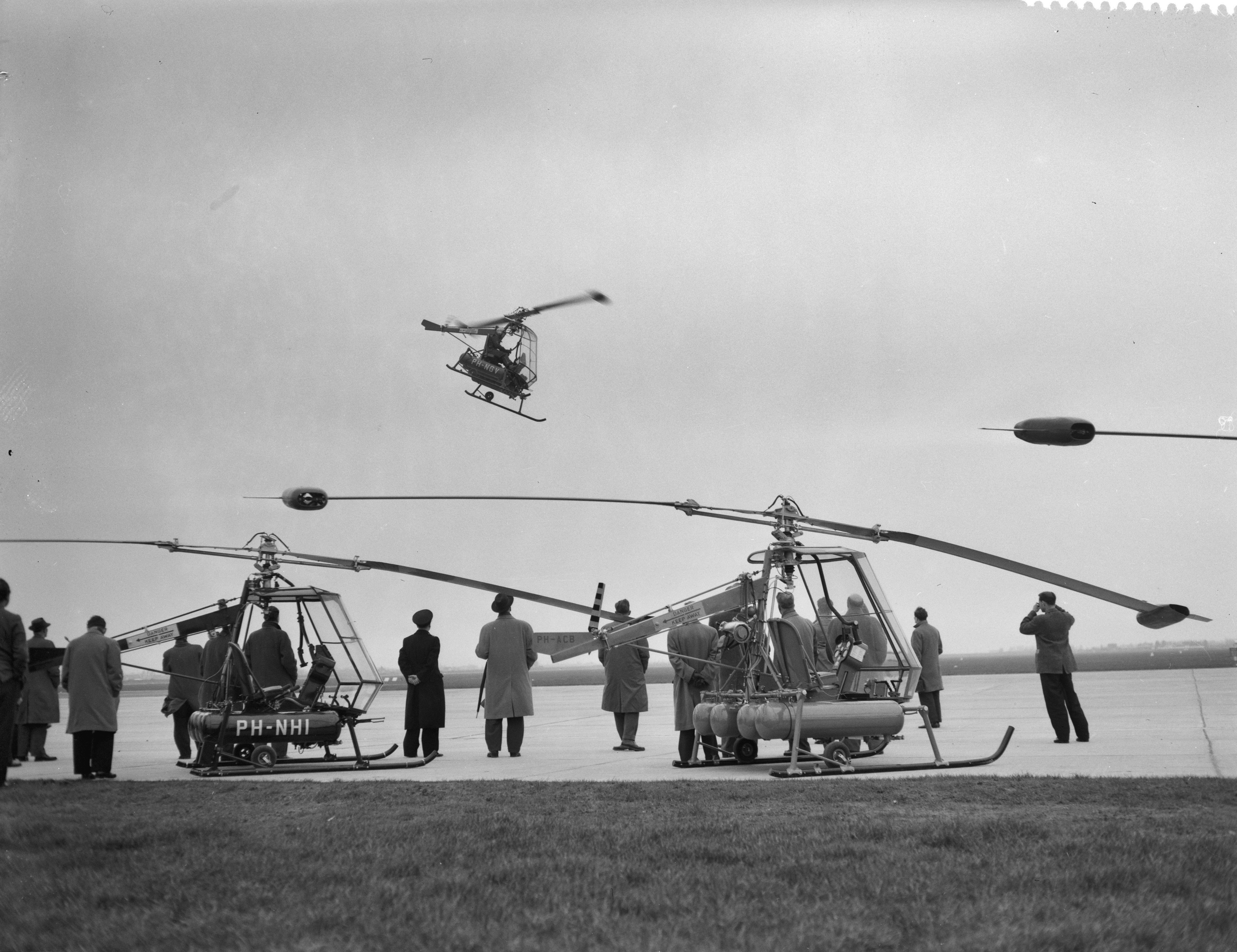
Demonstration flight in 1958

The company was founded in 1955 as a commercial successor of the Stichting voor de Ontwikkeling en Bouw van een Experimenteel Hefschroefvliegtuig (SOBEH - the Foundation for Development and Manufacturing of an Experimental Helicopter). From 1951 on, SOBEH developed and built two helicopters, the H-1 (1954) and H-2 (1955). After having met its goal of developing a helicopter, SOBEH ceased activities. Further development and serial production were granted to the newly formed NHI. This was a joint venture between aircraft manufacturer Aviolanda and truck company Kromhout. NHI quickly came forward with an improved design, called the H-3 Kolibrie (Hummingbird). This helicopter was powered by ramjets at the ends of the blades and made its first flight in May 1956. The Certificate of Airworthiness, based on U.S. requirements for rotorcraft, was issued in March 1958.

== Later operations ==
During its existence, NHI was confronted with parent companies in trouble. Kromhout ceased building trucks in 1958 due to stiff competition from DAF. It kept building engines and finally the company was taken over by Stork B.V. As a result, Kromhout gave up its partnership in 1959. Aviolanda resumed production of the H-3 on its own.

== Closure of operations ==
Finally in 1961 production ceased due to a lack of orders. Subsequently, NHI was liquidated by Aviolanda. The failure of NHI was only a contributing factor to the liquidation, as Aviolanda and Fokker were having hard times. Aviolanda depended heavily on licensed production of foreign designs, which made the business uncertain. Fokker was having troubles by that date with the slow selling F.27 Friendship.

== See also ==
- NHIndustries
