= Aviolanda =

Dutch airframe manufacturer from Papendrecht

- Industry: Aircraft manufacturer
- Founded: December 1926; 99 years ago
- Founder: H. Adolph Burgerhout
- Defunct: 1967
- Headquarters: Papendrecht, Netherlands
- Products: Airplanes, flying boats, target drones

Aviolanda was a Dutch aircraft manufacturer. The company was established in December 1926 by H. Adolph Burgerhout. Aviolanda mainly produced licensed-built aircraft, such as the Curtiss P-6 Hawk, the Dornier Wal and Do 24 flying boats, and the Gloster Meteor, Hawker Hunter and the Lockheed F-104 Starfighter jets. Aviolanda was the parent company of Dutch helicopter manufacturer NHI. It was eventually taken over by Fokker Aircraft in 1967 and was renamed Avio-Fokker.

Aviolanda had its main plant in Papendrecht. The production facility in Papendrecht was later used by GKN Aerospace to produce fuselage sections of the NHIndustries NH90.

== Aircraft produced ==
- Aviolanda AT-21 target drone
