= Doblhoff WNF 342 =

German experimental tip jet helicopter

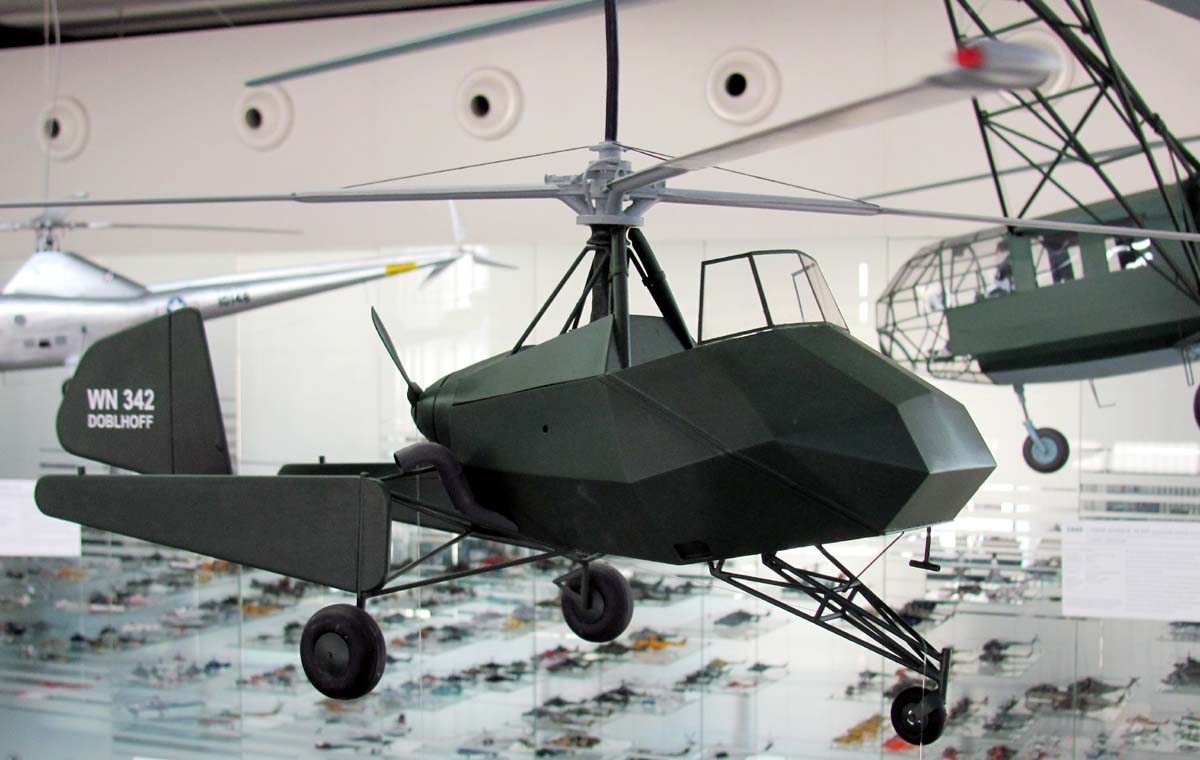
- Doblhoff WNF 342 V4 model in the Hubschraubermuseum Bückeburg (Helicopter Museum Bückeburg)

General information
- Type: Tip jet research helicopter
- National origin: Germany
- Manufacturer: Wiener-Neustädter Flugzeugwerke
- Designer: Friedrich von Doblhoff
- Number built: 3

History
- First flight: 1943

The Doblhoff WNF 342 was an early experimental tip jet helicopter designed and produced by Wiener-Neustädter Flugzeugwerke. It was the first helicopter to take off and land using tip jets to drive the rotor.

== Design and development ==
The WNF 342 is closely associated with an ambitious requirement issued by the German Navy that sought an aerial observation platform that would be suitable for use aboard not only relatively compact ships but even its extensive submarine fleet as well. Friedrich von Doblhoff, an Austrian designer and helicopter pioneer, opted to produce a response; work on the venture commenced in 1942. The Reichsluftfahrtministerium (RLM/Reich Aviation Ministry) quickly took an interest in the venture, extending its support and financial backing for development.

The rotorcraft design produced by von Doblhoff featured a highly innovative propulsion system. While equipped with a conventional piston engine, this did not drive the main rotor in a traditional sense. It did drive both a compact rear-facing propeller (to provide airflow across its rudder and thereby directional control) and an onboard air compressor that supplied air (which was subsequently mixed with fuel) through the rotor head and hollow rotor blades to combustion chambers at the rotor tips. Known as tip jets, the ignition of this fuel-air mixture at the rotor tips provided all of the thrust to drive the main rotor. This arrangement avoided the torque problems that conventional rotorcraft needed to account for, and thus it could dispense with a tail rotor. One disadvantage of this approach was a relatively high rate of fuel consumption.

Refinement of von Doblhoff's design in coordination with the German aircraft manufacturer Wiener-Neustädter Flugzeugwerke would lead to the WNF 342. von Doblhoff promoted the WNF 342 to perform various roles, including as a transport that he claimed would be capable of conveying up to six tons of cargo over medium distances at a low speed. Work on the project was pursued even as the Second World War entered its final years.

== Flight testing ==
Flight testing of the initial rotorcraft, referred to as V1, commenced in 1943. It was the first tip jet helicopter to be flown in the world. It was immediately apparent that the tip jets were responsible for generating a great deal of noise in addition to the necessary thrust, to the extent that it was seen as a problem for its prospective operational use. Furthermore, the large Coriolia acceleration exerted on the airflow inside of the rotor blades led to issues maintaining steady combustion. It was also determined that the initial head-pitch control arrangement did not fulfil requirements. Despite these issues, flight testing revealed the rotorcraft to possess favourable stability.

A total of five prototypes would be sequentially built, each one incorporating the lessons gained from its predecessor and thus incorporating improvements as testing continued. Changes included the adoption of more powerful piston engines, redesigned rotor blades, and an enlarged cabin. The final revision produced was the V4, which featured a twin-seat cabin arrangement along with redesigned flight controls. It performed limited flight testing over a total of 25 flight hours before the rotorcraft was captured by the United States military.

Deeming the WNF 342 to be valuable enough to be worth further study, on 19 July 1945, V4 was shipped to the continental United States under Operation Lusty aboard the aircraft carrier HMS Reaper. Following its arrival in the US, along with several other captured German objects of interest, including some Flettner Fl 282 and Focke-Achgelis Fa 330 helicopters, V4 was transported to Freeman Army Airfield, outside Seymour, Indiana, where it was statically examined in depth and restored to an airworthy condition. During 1946, V4 was relocated to Wilbur Wright Field, Riverside, Ohio, where it underwent limited flight testing, remaining tethered to the ground at all times. In the late 1940s, it was transported to Schenectady, New York and handed over to the General Electric Company for further testing. The ultimate fate of V4 is unknown.

The WNF 342 influenced several nation's early rotorcraft programmes. Perhaps the most apparent was the Sud-Ouest Ariel and SNCASO SO.1221 Djinn helicopters produced by the French aviation company Sud-Ouest, the latter being the only tip jet helicopter to attain production status.

== Variants ==
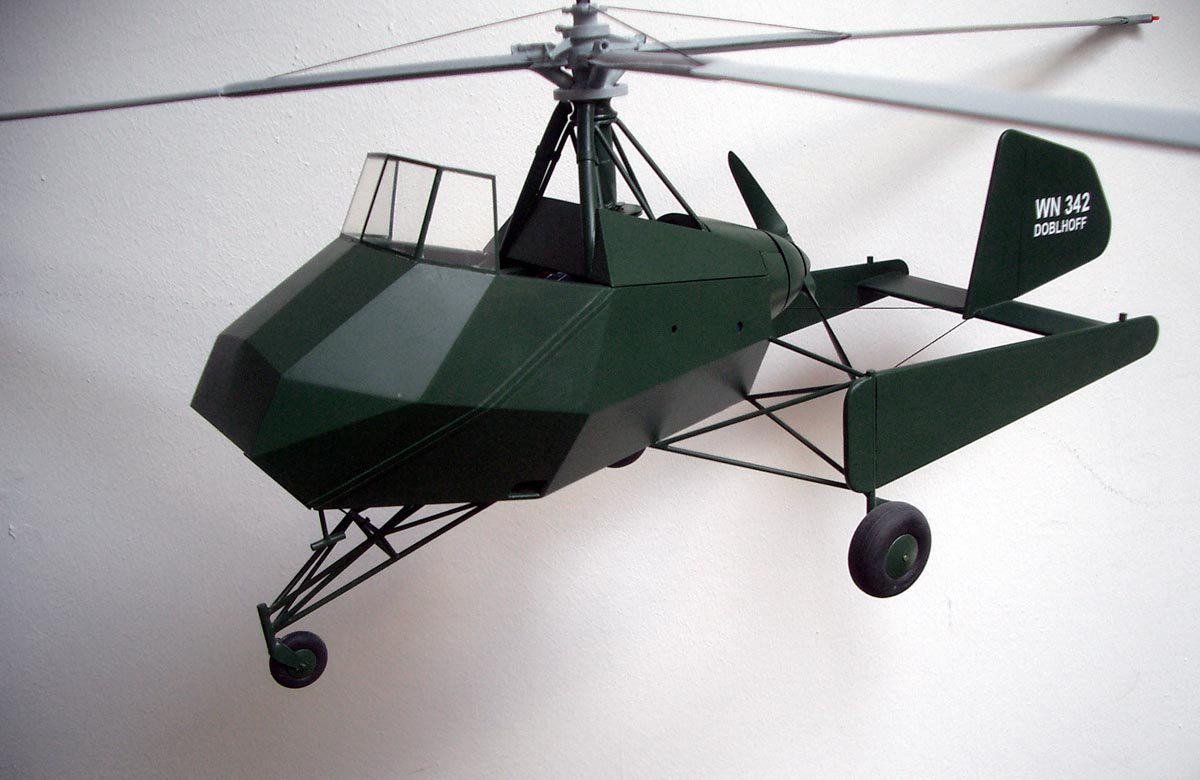
Doblhoff WNF 342 V4 model

- V1/V2: The initial design, being initially powered by a 60 horsepower (45 kW) engine (V1) and later by a 90 horsepower (67 kW) engine (V2)—both by Walter Mikron. It first flew in 1943, and was captured with V4 at Zell am See.
- V3: It was provisioned with a larger rotor. It was destroyed during testing due to oscillatory resonance.
- V4: The last unit produced was a two-seat variant with new collective and cyclic controls. It was only briefly flight tested prior to being captured by the United States.

== Specifications (V4) ==
Data from Illustrated Encyclopedia of Aircraft

General characteristics

- Crew: 2
- Empty weight: 430 kg (948 lb)
- Gross weight: 640 kg (1,411 lb)
- Powerplant: 1 × BMW-Bramo Sh.14A radial piston engine , 104 kW (140 hp)
- Main rotor diameter: 10.00 m (32 ft 9.75 in)
- Main rotor area: 78.54 m^{2} (845.42 sq ft)

Performance

- Maximum speed: 48 km/h (30 mph, 26 kn)

== See also ==
Related lists

- List of rotorcraft
