= Fokker Technologies =

Dutch aerospace company

- Industry: Aerospace
- Founded: 1 January 2011
- Fate: Acquired by GKN and now GKN Aerospace
- Headquarters: Papendrecht, Netherlands
- Products: Structures; Landing Gears; Electrical Systems; Aircraft Maintenance Services
- Number of employees: 16,000 (2026)
- Parent: GKN

Fokker Technologies is a Dutch aerospace company owned by British aerospace supplier GKN. The company has production companies that design, develop, and produce structures, landing gear, and electrical systems for the aerospace and defense industry. In addition to the production capabilities, it also supplies integrated maintenance services to aircraft owners and operators.

== Operations ==
Fokker Technologies designs, develops, and produces advanced structures and electrical systems for the aerospace and defense industry and supplies integrated maintenance services and products to aircraft owners and operators.

The company consists of four business units:

- Fokker Aerostructures (lightweight structures)
- Fokker Elmo (wiring harnesses)
- Fokker Landing Gear (Landing Gear)
- Fokker Services (aerospace services provider)

== History ==
After the bankruptcy of the former aircraft manufacturer Fokker in 1996, Stork B.V. acquired the Fokker companies specialized in the building of aircraft components and aircraft maintenance services, which were named as Stork Aerospace. The group had many names until 2010; when the Fokker name was reintroduced.

In July 2015, the British aerospace supplier GKN announced their intention to acquire Fokker Technologies from Arle Capital at the value of €706 million. Fokker was acquired in the same year by GKN.
