= Monocopter =

Rotorcraft with a single rotating blade

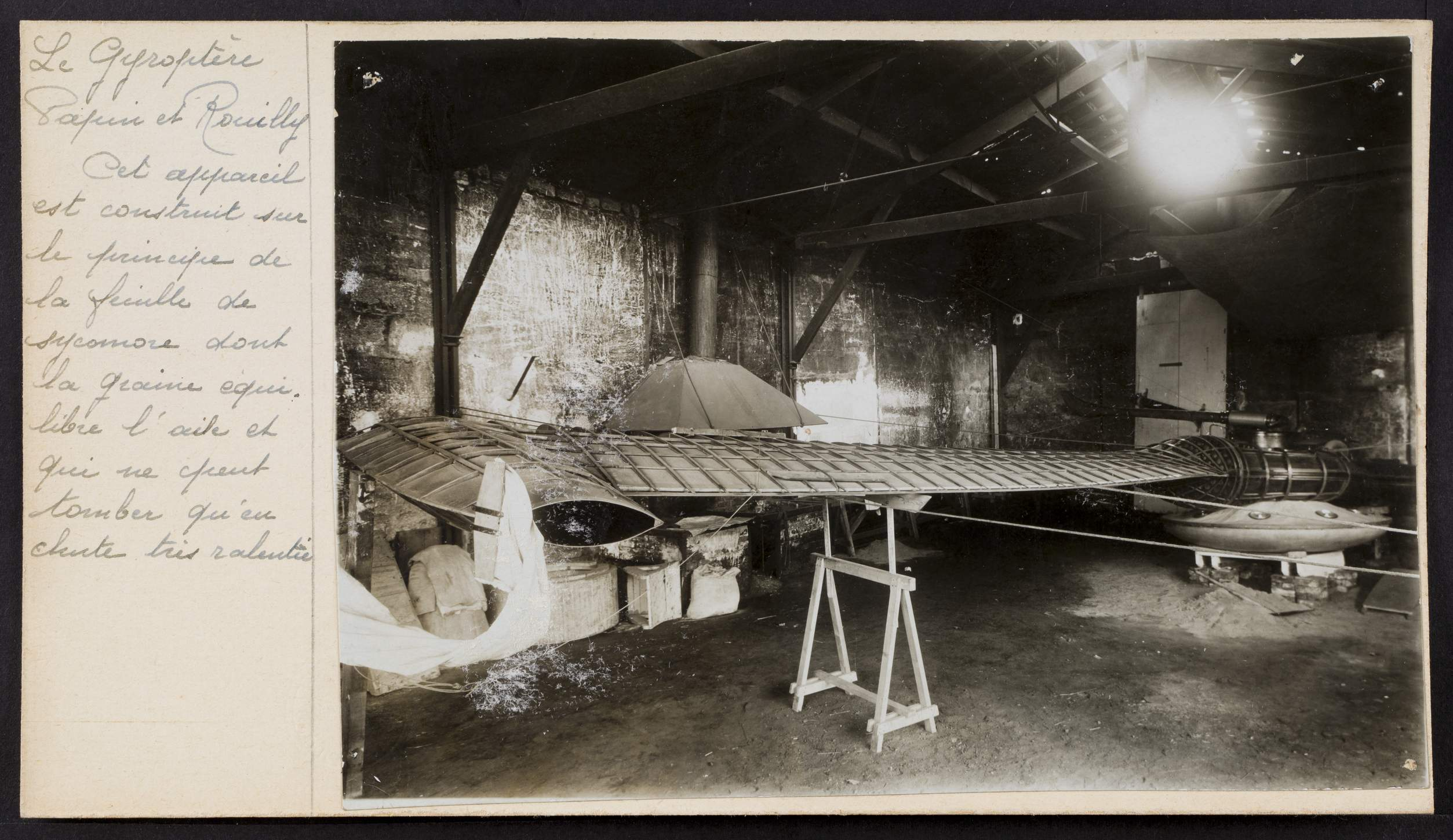
Gyropter Papin et Rouilly

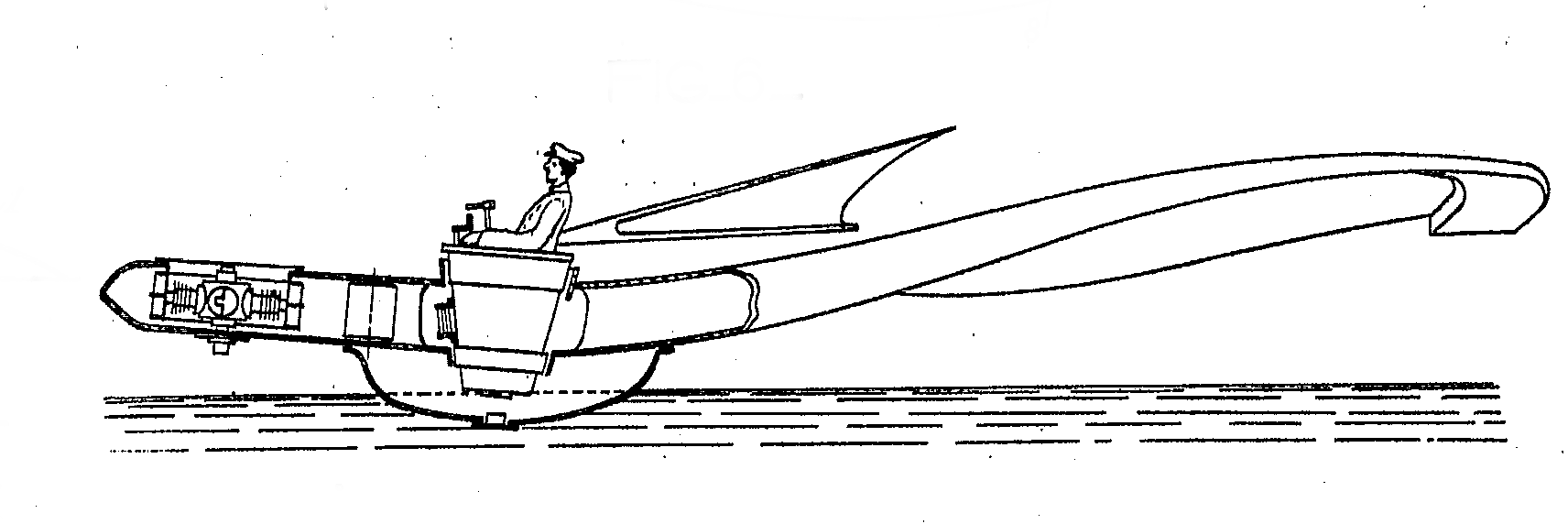
Monocopter design from Alphonse Papin and Didier Rouilly's 1914 patent

A monocopter or gyropter is a rotorcraft that uses a single rotating blade. The concept is similar to the whirling helicopter seeds that fall from some trees. The name gyropter is sometimes applied to monocopters in which the entire aircraft rotates about its center of mass as it flies. The name "monocopter" has also been applied to the personal jet pack constructed by Andreas Petzoldt.

== History ==
=== Papin-Rouilly Gyroptère ===
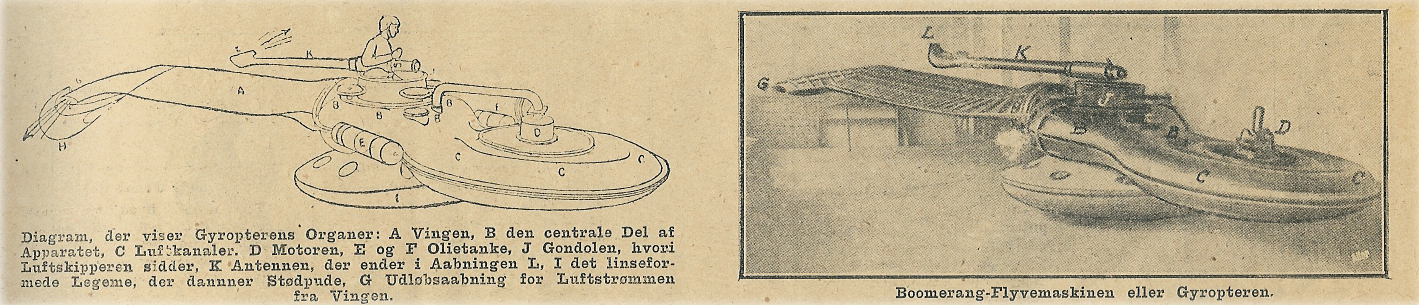
The Gyropter depicted in a 1914 Danish magazine. The caption reads: "Diagram showing the parts of the gyropter: A. The wing. B. The central part of the machine. C. Airchannels. D. The motor. E & F. The oiltank. J. The gondola, wherein the aircaptain sits. K. The antenna that ends in the opening L, I. the lens-shaped body that creates a cushion. G. Emitter-opening for the airstream from the wing. The caption on the second picture reads: "The boomerang flying machine or the gyropter."

The Gyroptère was designed in 1913–1914 by Alphonse Papin and Didier Rouilly in France, inspired by a maple seed. Papin and Rouilly obtained French patents 440,593 and 440,594 for their invention, and later obtained US patent 1,133,660 in 1915. The Gyroptère was characterized in the contemporary French journal La Nature in 1914 as "un boomerang géant" (a giant boomerang). Following demonstrations of small rocket-powered models, the Army ordered a manned prototype in 1913.

Papin and Rouilly's "Gyroptère" weighed 500 kg (1,100 lb) including the float on which it was mounted. It had a single hollow blade with an area of 12 square metres (130 sq ft), counterweighted by a fan driven by an 80 hp Le Rhone rotary engine spinning at 1,200 rpm, which produced an output of just over 7 cubic metres (250 cu ft) of air per second. The fan also propelled air through the hollow blade, from which it escaped through an L-shaped tube at a speed of 100 m/s (330 ft/s). Directional control was to be achieved by means of a small auxiliary tube through which some of the air was driven and which could be directed in whatever direction the pilot wished. The pilot's position was located at the centre of gravity between the blade and the fan.

Testing was delayed due to the outbreak of World War I and did not take place until 31 March 1915 on Lake Cercey on the Côte-d'Or. Due to the difficulty of balancing the craft, a rotor speed of only 47 rpm was achieved instead of the 60 rpm which had been calculated as necessary for takeoff. In addition, the rotary engine used was not powerful enough; it had originally been planned to use a 100 hp car engine, which proved unobtainable. The aircraft became unstable and the pilot had to abandon it, after which it sank.

=== Sikorsky XV-2 ===
The Sikorsky XV-2, also known by the Sikorsky Aircraft model number S-57, was a planned experimental stoppable rotor aircraft that was developed for a joint research program between the United States Air Force and the United States Army. The design utilized a single-rotor design: a counterweight provided stability to the rotor system, while a tip-jet arrangement powered the rotor, which was to be retracted into the upper fuselage when stopped, with the XV-2 then flying like a conventional aircraft on delta wings. A single jet engine was to be provided for forward flight, and was to be equipped with thrust vectoring for steering in hover and for anti-torque control in lieu of a tail rotor. The program was cancelled before construction of the prototype began.

=== Bölkow Bo 103 ===
The Bölkow Bo 103 was an ultralight helicopter designed for reconnaissance and command-control purposes and constructed by Bölkow Entwicklungen KG in 1961 as part of a research order by the German Federal Ministry of Defense. It had a 6.66 m (21.9 ft) diameter monoblade rotor constructed of GRP in a single piece that incorporated its counterweight. A single prototype was built, but work was stopped in 1962 due to lack of interest on the part of the West German armed forces.

=== VJ-1X ===
The VJ-1X was an ultralight single blade helicopter powered by a rotor-mounted pulsejet. Windspire, Inc. includes the plans for sale in their book How to Build a Jet Helicopter.

== UAVs ==
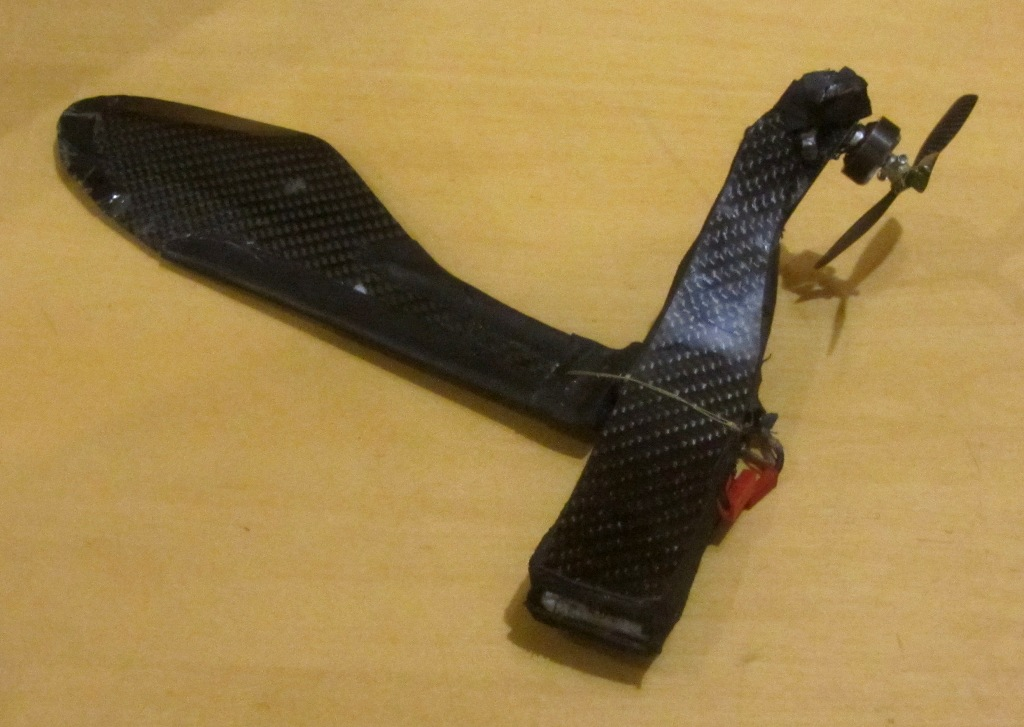
The RoboSeed Nano controllable monocopter UAV

Monocopters, in which the entire aircraft rotates about its center of mass as it flies, present advantages and challenges as unmanned aerial vehicles (UAVs) to the designer. As highly centripetal machines, they cannot be manned.

The first of these monocopters were constructed by Dr. Charles W. McCutchen and powered by reciprocating model airplane engines in 1952. He flew them at Lake Placid and named them "Charybdis machines". Other early experimenters were William Foshag and Joe Carter.

These types of monocopters caught on in the model airplane world, particularly in Eastern Europe, where free flight record-setting models were constructed by George Horvath of Hungary, Sergei Vorabyev and V. Naidovsky of Russia, and Steffan Purice of Romania. An exception to the lack of US enthusiasm was Dick Place's "Flying Machine" of 1964 and Ken Willard's "Rotoriser" of 1984. In 2002, Ron Jesme made the first successful electric propeller monocopter. Daedalus Research of Logan, Utah, also manufactured a monocopter kit, "Maple Seed," using a 0.049 model-airplane engine.

Gordon Mandell of the M.I.T. Model Rocket Society designed a model-rocket engine powered monocopter, which he named "turbocopter," and published the design concept in his column "Wayward Wind" in Model Rocketry Magazine in 1969. A later version of this was researched at MIT in 1980. This design prompted Korey Kline, an early member of the Tripoli Rocketry Association, to design his own rocket-powered monocopters which fly on long-burn model rocket engines. They were demonstrated at various rocket launch events in the 1980s to crowds that raved at their performance. A few were manufactured as kits by Ace Rocketry at that time.

Korey Kline published very little about monocopters, rocket or otherwise, and so by the 1990s the monocopter had faded from view. Edward Miller of Pennsylvania began experimenting with them again in the late 1990s, as well as Francis Graham, a Kent State University, Ohio, physics professor. By 1999 both were flying rocket monocopters. Francis Graham wrote a book, Monocopters, with some theory of their flight characteristics, in 1999, sold by Apogee Components of Colorado Springs. Ed Miller went on to build the largest high power rocket monocopters ever flown, with 8 foot large fiberglass-covered wooden wings, and also sells them. Chuck Rudy flew a large monocopter with a hybrid rocket engine, using solid and liquid fuel. Francis Graham continued to promote monocopters and organized a small conference held in Washington, Pennsylvania, in 2001. He also presented a paper on the subject at the 2003 Century-of-Flight conference sponsored by the AIAA in Dayton.

Joseph Peklicz of Martin's Ferry scaled down the monocopter into a kit form using small model rocket engines and sold many to individuals and schools. His kits are still available and widely sold. In 2008, Art Applewhite of Kerrville, Texas, began selling a popular line of rocket-powered monocopter kits as well.

Monocopters that rotate entirely had no practical purpose prior to 2003, but, due in part to Graham's book, that would change. Patent 7,104,862 was awarded in 2006 to Michael A. Dammar of Vera-Tech Aero RPV Corp. of Edina, Minnesota, for a monocopter military reconnaissance device that was remotely controlled and took short exposures. Another remote-controlled monocopter, which could fly indoors on an electric motor, and which uses the Earth's magnetic field as a reference, was developed by Woody Hoburg and James Houghton at MIT in 2007–2008.

== See also ==
- Tip jet

== Notes ==
Citations

Bibliography

- Allen, Francis J. (Spring 1993). "The McDonnell XV-1". AAHS Journal. 38 (1). Huntington Beach, CA: American Aviation Historical Society.
- Boyne, Walter J. (1984). Vertical Flight: The Age of the Helicopter. Washington, DC: Smithsonian Institution Press. ISBN 978-0874742794.
- Sikorsky, Sergei I. (2007). The Sikorsky Legacy. Images of Aviation. Charleston, SC: Arcadia Publishing. ISBN 978-0738549958.
