= Groen =

Groen or de Groen is a surname of Dutch origin, meaning green. The name may refer to:

- Family de Groen
- Alma De Groen (born 1941), Australian feminist playwright
- Annemarie Groen (born 1955), Dutch Olympic swimmer
- Arnoud van Groen (born 1983), Dutch cyclist
- Bert Groen (born 1945), Dutch corporate director and politician
- Dora van der Groen (1927–2015), Belgian actress and theatre director
- Egbert B. Groen (1915–2012), American (Illinois) politician and lawyer
- Els de Groen (1949–2025), Dutch politician and Member of the European Parliament
- Frédéric François Groen (1814–1882), Dutch shipbuilder
- Fenton Groen (born 1950), American politician from New Hampshire
- Geoffrey de Groen (born 1938), Australian artist known for his abstract works in oil and acrylics
- Georgia Groen (fl. 2016), New Zealand barefoot water-skier
- Guillaume Groen van Prinsterer (1801–1876), Dutch politician and historian
- Ike Groen (born 1992), Dutch cyclist
- Jitse Groen (born 1978/1979), Dutch billionaire businessman, founder of Takeaway.com
- Lou Groen (1917–2011), American restaurateur, inventor of the Filet-O-Fish sandwich
- Marcel Groen (born 1945), Dutch-American Chairman of the Pennsylvania Democratic Party
- Pieter Groen (Anglicized: Peter Green; 1808–1902), Dutch fisherman, "uncrowned king of Tristan da Cunha"
- Richard de Groen (born 1962), New Zealand cricketer
- Rob Groen (1938–2018), Dutch rower
- Sander Groen (born 1968), Dutch tennis player
- Sara Groen (born 1981), Australian actress and television presenter
- Tiemen Groen (1946–2021), Dutch cyclist
- Warren Groen, American politician from New Hampshire

== See also ==
- Groen River, river in the Northern Cape province of South Africa
- GroenLinks, green political party in the Netherlands
- Groen (political party), green political party in Belgium
- Groen Brothers Aviation, Inc., American autogyro company founded by David and Jay Groen
  - Products: Groen Hawk 4, Groen ShadowHawk, Groen Sparrowhawk
