= Gyrodyne (disambiguation) =

A gyrodyne is a type of aircraft that uses a helicopter rotor for take-off, landing, and hovering but traditional airplane propulsion for forward flight.

It may also refer to:

== Aircraft ==
- Fairey FB-1 Gyrodyne, a gyrodyne built in 1947 by the Fairey Aviation Company
- Fairey Jet Gyrodyne, a gyrodyne built in 1951 by the Fairey Aviation Company
- Gyrodyne GCA-2, a helicopter built in 1949 by the Gyrodyne Company of America
- Gyrodyne RON Rotorcycle, a single-seat helicopter built in 1955 by the Gyrodyne Company of America
- Gyrodyne QH-50 DASH, a drone helicopter built in 1962 by the Gyrodyne Company of America

== Other uses ==
- Control moment gyroscope, a spacecraft control device referred to as a gyrodyne by the Soviet space program
- Gyrodine, a 1984 arcade video game published by Taito
- Gyrodyne Company of America, an American real estate firm founded as a helicopter design firm
