= Shadow Hawk =

Shadow Hawk or ShadowHawk may refer to:

- Shadow Hawk, a historical novel by Andre Norton
- Groen ShadowHawk, an American gyroplane design
- ShadowHawk (character), a fictional comic book character
