= Skyworks =

Skyworks may refer to:

- City of Perth Skyworks, an annual fireworks display in Perth, Australia
- Skyworks Global, an American autogyro research and development company
- Skyworks Solutions, a manufacturer of semiconductor chips for communications technologies, headquartered in Irvine, California.
