= Gyrodyne =

Type of VTOL aircraft

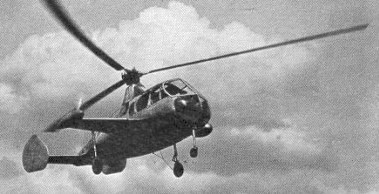
A Fairey FB-1 Gyrodyne

A gyrodyne is a type of VTOL heavier-than-air aircraft that uses a helicopter rotor system (either in unicopter, bicopter or multicopter forms) driven by its own engines only for takeoff, landing and hovering, and one or more conventional propellers or jet engines to provide thrust during forward flight. During cruising flight, the rotor(s) are left in unpowered autorotation like an autogyro (but unlike a compound helicopter, whose main rotor remains powered), and lift is provided by a combination of the airfoils on both the rotor(s) and fixed wings. The gyrodyne is one of a number of similar concepts (such as convertiplanes like tiltrotors and tiltwings) which attempt to combine the low-speed maneuverability of rotorcraft with the high airspeeds of conventional airplanes.

The gyrodyne was invented by British engineer Dr. James Allan Jamieson Bennett, the chief technical officer of Cierva Autogiro, as an alternative to the helicopter, in response to an Air Ministry specification. The gyrodyne was envisioned as an intermediate type of rotorcraft between a helicopter and an autogyro, its rotor operating parallel to the flightpath to minimize axial flow with one or more propellers providing propulsion. Bennett's patent covered a variety of designs, which has led to some of the terminological confusion – other issues including the trademarked Gyrodyne Company of America and the Federal Aviation Administration (FAA) classification of rotorcraft.

In recent years, a related concept has been promoted under the name heliplane. Originally used to market gyroplanes built by two different companies, the term has been adopted to describe a Defense Advanced Research Projects Agency (DARPA) program to develop advances in rotorcraft technology with the goal of overcoming the current limitations of helicopters in both speed and payload.

== Principles of operation ==
Where a conventional helicopter has a powered rotor which provides both lift and forward thrust, and is capable of true VTOL performance, a gyroplane or autogyro has a free-spinning rotor which relies on independent powered thrust to provide forward airspeed and keep it spinning. The gyrodyne combines aspects of each. It has an independent thrust system like the autogyro, but can also drive the rotor to allow vertical takeoff and landing; it then changes to free spinning like an autogyro during cruising flight.

In the helicopter, the spinning rotor blades draw air down through the rotor disc; to obtain forward thrust, the rotor disc tilts forward so that air is also blown backwards. In the autogyro the rotor disc is by contrast tilted backwards; as the main thrust drives the craft forwards, air flows through the rotor disc from below, causing it to spin and create lift. The gyrodyne is capable of transitioning between these two modes of flight.

Typically a gyrodyne also has fixed wings which provide some of the lift during forward flight, allowing the rotor to be offloaded. A computer simulation has suggested an optimum distribution of lift of 9% for the rotor, and 91% for the wing. However if the rotor is too lightly loaded it can become susceptible to uncontrolled flapping.

== History ==
In 1926, with the financial support of Scottish industrialist and aviator James George Weir, Juan de la Cierva founded the Cierva Autogiro Company in the United Kingdom to develop and commercialise his invention the autogyro. Drawing on the autogyro concept, Dr. James Allan Jamieson Bennett, who was promoted to the position of chief technical officer (chief engineer) of the Cierva Autogiro Company following the death of de la Cierva, conceived an intermediate type of rotorcraft in 1936, which he named the gyrodyne, and which was tendered to the British Government in response to an Air Ministry specification that required an aircraft with true vertical flight and hovering capabilities. In 1939, Bennett was issued a patent from the UK Patent Office, assigned to the Cierva Autogiro Company. On 23 August 1940 the Autogiro Company of America, licensees of the Cierva Autogiro Company, Ltd., filed a corresponding patent application in the United States. On 27 April 1943, US patent #2,317,340 was issued to the Autogiro Company of America. The patents describe a gyrodyne as:

a rotary wing aircraft intermediate in type, hereinafter referred to as "gyrodyne", between a rotaplane (with the rotor free for autorotation and an upward total axial flow through the rotor disc), on the one hand, and a pure helicopter (with the rotor driven, and a downward total axial flow through the rotor disc), on the other hand, that is with a mean axial flow through the rotor disc substantially zero at high forward speed.

Bennett's concept described a shaft-driven rotor, with anti-torque and propulsion for translational flight provided by one or more propellers mounted on stub wings. With thrust being provided by the propellers at cruise speeds, power would be provided to the rotor only to overcome the profile drag of the rotor, operating in a more efficient manner than the freewheeling rotor of an autogyro in autorotation. Bennett described this flight regime of the gyrodyne as an "intermediate state", requiring power to be supplied to both the rotor and the propulsion system.

=== Early development ===
The Cierva Autogiro Company Ltd's, C.41 gyrodyne pre-WW2 design study was updated and built by Fairey Aviation as the FB-1 Gyrodyne commencing in 1945. Fairey's development efforts were initially led by Bennett, followed by his successor Dr. George S. Hislop. George B.L. Ellis and Frederick L. Hodgess, engineers from the pre-WW2 Cierva Autogiro Company, Ltd., joined Bennett at Fairey Aviation. The first Fairey Gyrodyne prototype crashed during a test flight, killing the crew. The second Gyrodyne prototype was rebuilt as the Jet Gyrodyne and used to develop a pressure-jet rotor drive system later for the Rotodyne transport compound gyroplane. At the tip of each stub wing were rearward-facing propellers which provided both yaw control and propulsion in forward flight. The Jet Gyrodyne flew in 1954, and made a true transition from vertical to horizontal flight in March 1955.

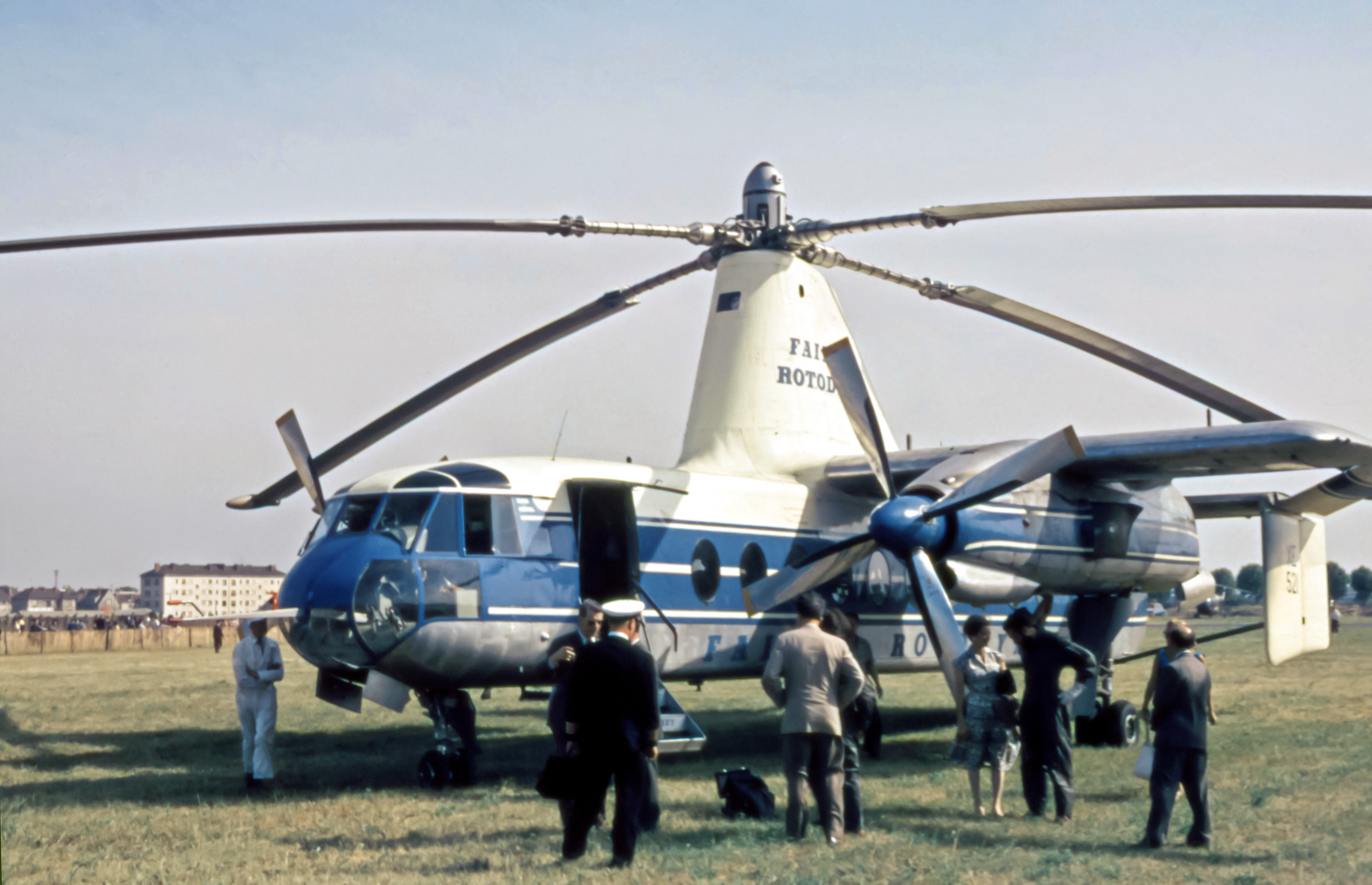
The Fairey Rotodyne Y in 1959

This led to the prototype Fairey Rotodyne, which was developed to combine the efficiency of a fixed-wing aircraft at cruise with the VTOL capability of a helicopter to provide short haul airliner service from city centres to airports. It had short wings that carried two Napier Eland turboprop engines for forward propulsion and up to 40% of the aircraft's weight in forward flight. The rotor was driven by tip jets for takeoff and landing and translational flight up to 80 mph. Despite considerable commercial and military interest worldwide in the prototype Type Y Rotodyne for air transport, British orders were not forthcoming and British Government financial support was terminated in 1962. The division's new parent Westland Helicopters did not see good cause for further investment and the project was stopped. With the end of the Fairey Aviation programs, gyrodyne development came to a halt, although several similar concepts continued to be developed.

== Similar developments ==
In 1954, the McDonnell XV-1 was developed as a rotorcraft with tip jets to provide vertical takeoff capability. The aircraft also had wings and a propeller mounted on the rear of the fuselage between twin tailbooms with two small rotors mounted at the end for yaw control. The second prototype of XV-1 became the world's first rotorcraft to exceed 200 mph in level flight on 10 October 1956. No more were built and the XV-1 project was terminated in 1957.

=== Compound autogyro ===
In 1998, Carter Aviation Technologies successfully flew its technology demonstrator aircraft. The aircraft is a compound autogyro with a high-inertia rotor and wings optimized for high-speed flight. In 2005, the aircraft demonstrated flight at mu-1, with the rotor tip having airspeed equal to the aircraft's forward airspeed, without any vibration or control issues occurring. The high-inertia rotor allowed the aircraft to hover for a brief moment during landing, even though the rotor is unpowered, and a prerotating gearbox allows the rotor to be accelerated for an autogyro-style jump takeoff.

=== Heliplane ===
In 1954, KYB built an aircraft named the Heliplane. The Heliplane was a Cessna 170B with the wings reduced to stubs, and a rotor powered by tip ramjets.

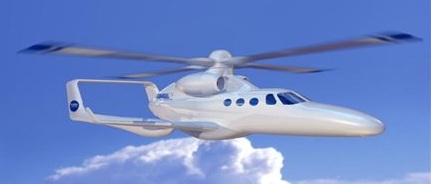
Image of baseline GBA-DARPA Heliplane concept, showing its free-spinning rotor, which is fitted with integral tipjets, fed with bypass air from two Williams gas-turbine propulsion engines.

DARPA was funding a project under the "Heliplane" name to develop the gyrodyne concept around 2007. Aircraft developed for the project would use a rotor for takeoff and landing vertically, and hovering, together with substantial wings to provide most of the required lift at cruise, combining the large cargo capacity, fuel efficiency, and high cruise speed of fixed-wing aircraft with the hovering capabilities of a helicopter. The project was "…a multi-year $40-million, four-phase program. Groen Brothers Aviation is working on phase one of that program, a 15-month effort… (it) combines the "gyroplane"… with a fixed-wing business jet. The team was using the Adam A700, in the very-light-jet class…" There were issues with tip jet noise, and the program was cancelled in 2008.

An industry magazine describes the gradual evolution of traditional helicopters as "slow" and lacking revolutionary steps, and non-traditional compounds are still not widespread.

== Trademark ==
"Gyrodyne" was granted as a trademark to the Gyrodyne Company of America in 1950. The company was not involved in gyrodyne development, but instead produced a turbine-engined, remotely piloted drone helicopter, with coaxial rotors, for the United States Navy, designated as the QH-50 DASH.

== Examples ==
- Fairey FB-1 Gyrodyne
- Fairey Jet Gyrodyne
- Fairey Rotodyne (1957)
- Flettner Fl 185
- Kamov Ka-22 (1959)
- Kayaba Heliplane (Japan)
- McDonnell XV-1
- Beta Technologies Alia A250

== See also ==
- Convertiplane
- Compound helicopter

	Aerostat	Aerodyne		
	Lift: Lighter than air gas	Lift: Fixed wing	Lift: Unpowered rotor	Lift: Powered rotor
Unpowered free flight	(Free) balloon	Glider	Helicopter, etc. in autorotation	(None – see note 2)
Tethered (static or towed)	Tethered balloon	Kite	Rotor kite	(None – see note 2)
Powered	Airship	Airplane, ornithopter, etc.	Autogyro	Gyrodyne, helicopter
