= SNCASO Farfadet =

Experimental convertiplane

SO.1310 Farfadet
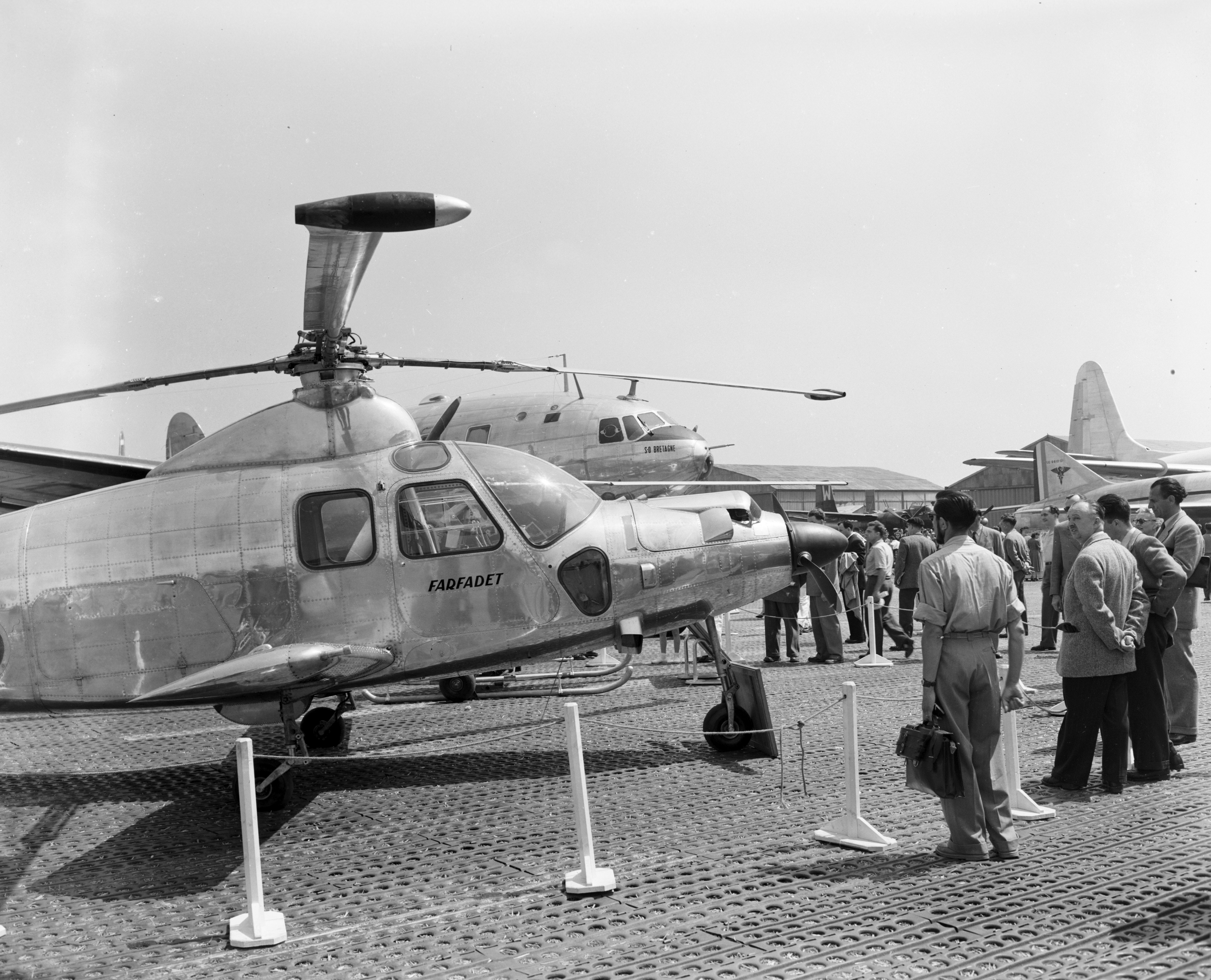
- SNCASO SO.1310 Farfadet at 1953 Paris Air Show

General information
- Type: Experimental convertiplane
- National origin: France
- Manufacturer: SNCASO

History
- First flight: 8 May 1953

The SNCASO SO.1310 Farfadet was an experimental French convertiplane of the 1950s.

== Design and development ==
The SO.1310 was a compound gyroplane featuring a tip-jet driven, three-bladed rotor, a fixed wing and a turboprop engine driving a nose-mounted propeller. First flown on 8 May 1953 the aircraft achieved transition to forward flight on 1 July of that year.

== Specifications (SO.1310) ==
Data from Taylor

General characteristics

- Crew: 2
- Capacity: 3 passengers, 2 stretchers or freight
- Wingspan: 6.3 m (20 ft 8 in)
- Powerplant: 1 × Turbomeca Arrius II gas-generator, providing compressed air to the rotor tips , 270 kW (360 hp)
- Powerplant: 1 × Turbomeca Artouste turboprop, driving propeller , 270 kW (360 hp)
- Main rotor diameter: 11.2 m (36 ft 9 in)

Performance

- Cruise speed: 240 km/h (150 mph, 130 kn)
- Range: 400 km (250 mi, 220 nmi)

== See also ==
Aircraft of comparable role, configuration, and era

- Fairey FB-1 Gyrodyne
- Percival P.74

Related lists

- List of rotorcraft
- List of VTOL aircraft

== Bibliography ==
- Taylor, John W.R. Jane's Pocket Book of Research and Experimental Aircraft, London, Macdonald and Jane's Publishers Ltd, 1976. ISBN 0-356-08409-4.
- "Aircraft Intelligence". Flight. Vol. LXIII, no. 2309. 24 April 1953. p. 513.
