= AAI Sparrowhawk =

SparrowHawk
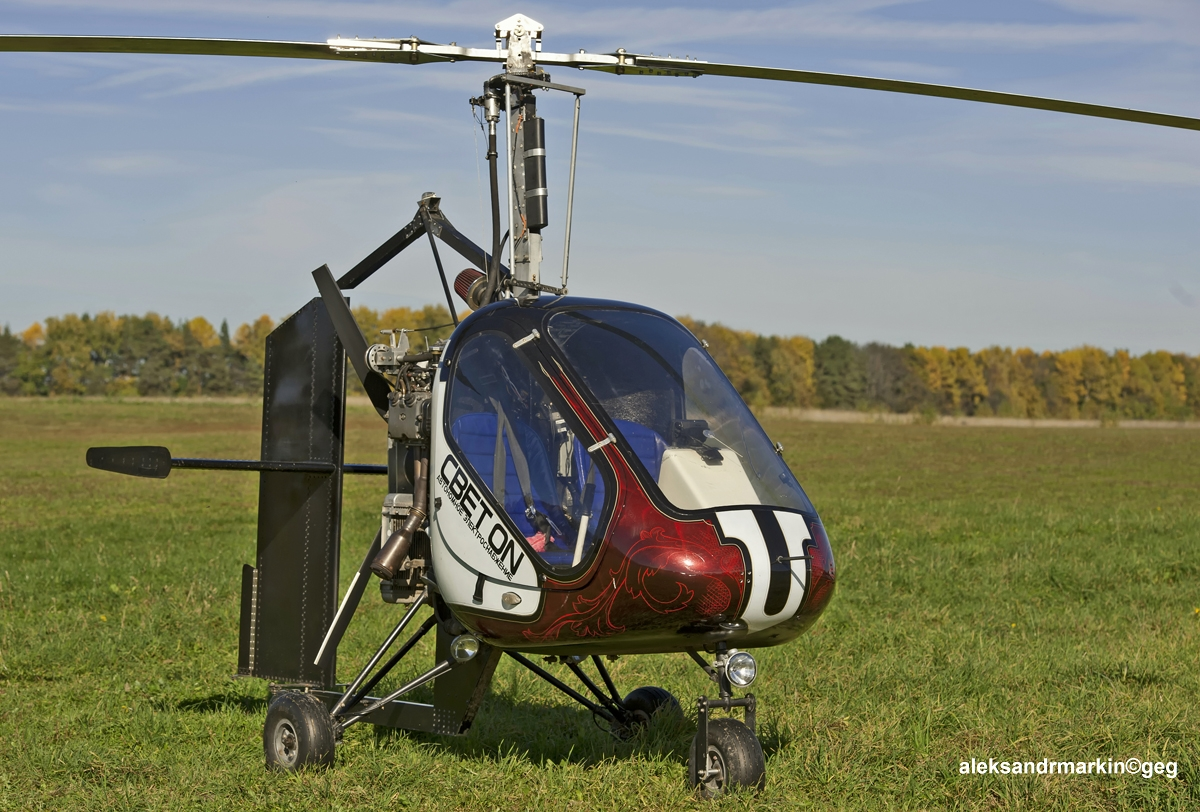

General information
- Type: Two seat homebuilt ultralight autogyro
- National origin: United States
- Manufacturer: American Autogyro Inc, Buckeye, Arizona
- Number built: 125 kits sold by mid-2008

History
- Introduction date: 2003
- First flight: February 2003 (proof of concept vehicle)

The AAI SparrowHawk is an American two-seat pusher ultralight autogyro, available in kit form for amateur construction.

== Design and development ==
AAI (American Autogyros Inc) was formed as a division of Groen Brothers Aviation (GBA) late in 2002, with the initial task of improving stability in existing autogyros. After a series of such modifications they decided to develop their own aircraft and a proof-of-concept machine first flew in February 2003. This was based around the pod of an RAF 2000 autogyro but had a different tail design. The first AAI built production prototype flew on 25 February 2004.

The SparrowHawk is a pusher configuration autogyro with an uncowled single 160 hp (120 kW) Subaru EJ25 flat-four engine mounted behind a totally enclosed glass fibre cabin. This pod, which seats two side by side, has almost triangular sides and is entered via optional large, partially glazed doors. An aluminum keel projects aft of the pod and a vertical member fixed to it carries the engine and rotor mast. The two-bladed rotor is of bonded metal construction.

The tail unit is attached by a pair of aluminum centreline booms. The upper one is mounted directly on the vertical engine/rotor mast and is cranked near midpoint to clear the propeller tips. The lower one is attached well below the keel on an extension plate. They support a deep, wide chord, finless rudder, formed from honeycomb composites material and carrying a pair of fixed horizontal stabilizers with small endplate fins. The rudder has self-centring springs. The resulting cruciform structure is centred on the propeller thrust line for dynamical stability.

The SparrowHawk has a tricycle undercarriage with three equal-size wheels mounted off the keel, supplemented by a smaller tailwheel. Steering on the ground is by rudder pedal-controlled differential braking and a steerable nosewheel.

== Operational history ==
The first kit built SparrowHawk flew in Russia on 23 September 2004. Dealerships were established in North, Central and South America, in India, East Asia and South America. 125 kits had been sold by mid-2008. By November 2009 there were 45 SparrowHawks on the US civil register. One SparrowHawk was on the European (west of Russia) registers in mid-2010. The Russian version is marketed by Aro-Avia.

In 2008 GBA announced its intention to sell off the SparrowHawk program. A press release in January 2011 announced an agreement with Guangzhou Suntrans Aviation Science and Technology Co., Ltd. to form a Cooperative Joint Venture for the manufacture of SparrowHawks in China.

== Variants ==
SparrowHawk I
Initial version, discontinued.
SparrowHawk II
Current version (2010) with wider cabin and simpler build.
SparrowHawk III
Quick build version, quoted time 300 h.
SparrowHawk APV
Airborne patrol version, as SparrowHawk II but with doors, heating and navigation lights as standard.
Spinus (Siskin in English)
Russian version.

== Specifications (SparrowHawk II) ==
Data from Jane's All the World's Aircraft 2010/11

General characteristics

- Crew: two
- Length: 12 ft 3 in (3.73 m) fuselage
- Width: 6 ft 1 in (1.85 m) fuselage maximum
- Height: 10 ft 0 in (3.05 m) overall
- Empty weight: 899 lb (408 kg)
- Gross weight: 1,499 lb (680 kg)
- Fuel capacity: 87 L (19.2 Imp gal, 23.0 US gal) usable
- Powerplant: 1 × Subaru EJ25 flat four piston, 160 hp (119 kW)
- Main rotor diameter: 30 ft 0 in (9.14 m)
- Main rotor area: 706.5 sq ft (65.64 m^{2}) ; 2-bladed rotor
- Propellers: 2-bladed fixed pitch, carbon fibre pusher

Performance

- Cruise speed: 75 mph (121 km/h, 65 kn) maximum
- Never exceed speed: 99 mph (160 km/h, 86 kn)
- Range: 281 mi (453 km, 245 nmi) at 75% power
- Endurance: 3 h
- Service ceiling: 10,010 ft (3,050 m)
- Rate of climb: 650 ft/min (3.3 m/s)
