= Museum of Berkshire Aviation =

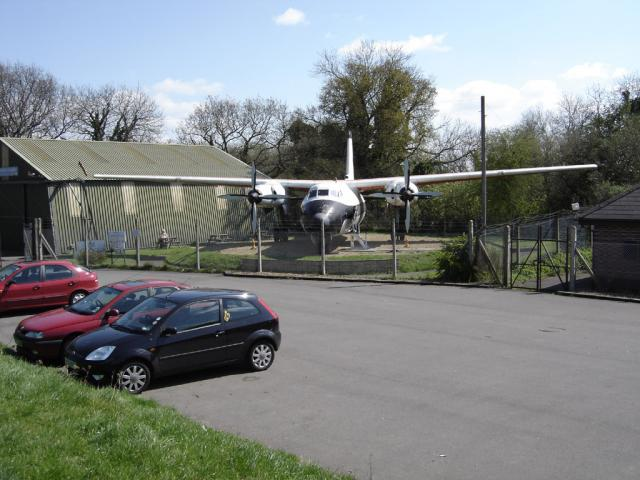
- Herald outside museum

- Location within Berkshire
- Established: 1993
- Location: Mohawk Way, Woodley
- Coordinates: 51°27′01″N 0°52′59″W
- Type: Aircraft museum
- Website: museumofberkshireaviation.co.uk

The Museum of Berkshire Aviation is a small aviation museum in Woodley, a town in Berkshire, England. The museum is on the edge of the site of the former Woodley Aerodrome and many of its exhibits relate to the Phillips & Powis company, later renamed Miles Aircraft, which was based there from 1932 to 1947.

== Collections ==
Many of the aircraft exhibited were built by Handley Page (Reading) Ltd, and by Fairey Aviation at White Waltham near Maidenhead.

Despite being a small museum, several of the exhibits are unique survivors. These include a Miles Martinet (a World War II target tug), the only Miles Student two-seat side-by-side jet trainer ever built, and a Fairey Jet Gyrodyne – a composite helicopter and autogyro, or gyrodyne.

Other exhibits include:

- A Fairey Gannet carrier-borne anti-submarine aircraft, formerly operated by the Royal Navy.
- A Handley Page Herald turboprop airliner, designed by Miles and built at Woodley after Handley Page took over Miles' aircraft contracts.
- A Miles Magister two-seat basic trainer aircraft.
