= Kayaba Heliplane =

Japanese gyrodyne prototype

Heliplane
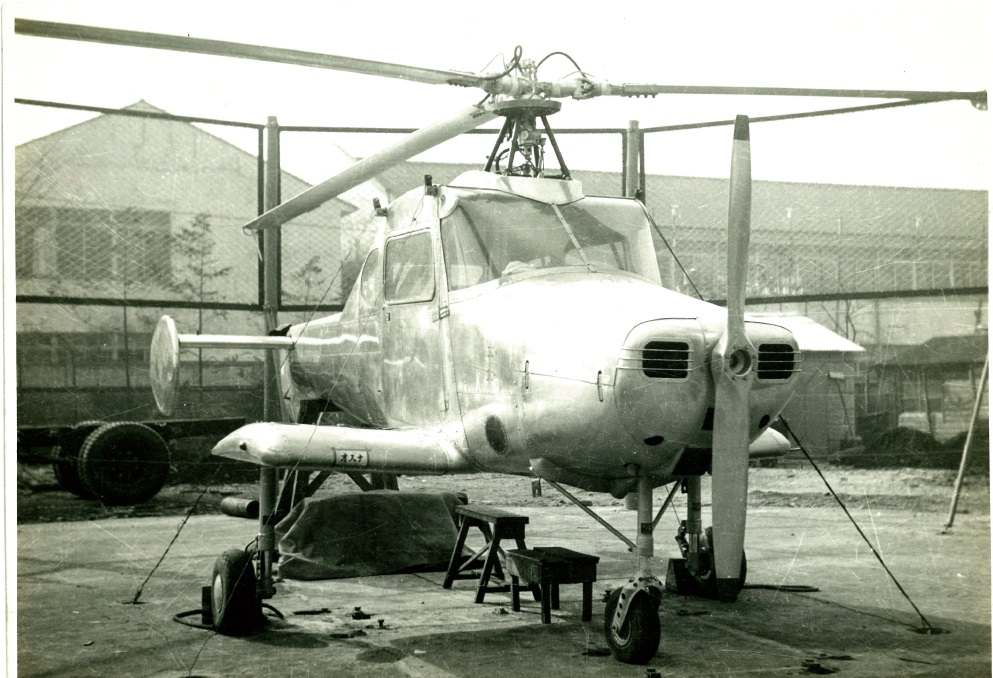

General information
- Type: Gyrodyne
- National origin: Japan
- Manufacturer: Kayaba Industry
- Status: Canceled
- Number built: 1

History
- Developed from: Cessna 170

The Kayaba Heliplane Type-1 (Japanese: ヘリプレーン 1型) was a gyrodyne (compound autogyro) designed by Shiro Kayaba and prototyped by Kayaba Industry in Japan during the early 1950s.

== Design and development ==
In March 1952, Kayaba Industry began the development of the Heliplane, a Gyrodyne, which combines the advantages of autogyro and helicopter. Kayaba took advantage of experience producing the Ka-Go Ka-1 and Ka-2 autogyros, intended for reconnaissance, artillery-spotting and anti-submarine use, developed during World War II.

Kayaba received a subsidy of 2 million yen from the government of Japan for the development of the aircraft, as well as 1.2 million yen from Ishikawajima Heavy Industries (IHI) for development of the rotor-tip ramjets. The aircraft was modified from Cessna 170B. The wing was removed, and a three-blade main rotor with support structure was installed on the upper part of the fuselage. In addition, short-span fixed wings were fitted to either side of the lower fuselage. For initial testing the fixed pitch wooden propeller of the Cessna 170 was retained, but a 3-bladed variable-pitch propeller was to be fitted for flight testing. Ishikawajima had developed the Ne-0 (Japanese: 石川島 ネ-0) ramjet during the war and tested it in flight beneath a Kawasaki Ki-48-II. A development of this ramjet was envisaged as the power source for the rotor drive. At takeoff, the rotor was to be started using the tip mounted ramjet engines, then transition to an autogyro powered by the propeller engine after the ramjets were stopped.

One prototype unit was produced and almost completed in March 1954 (Showa 29), but was damaged in July 1954 during tie-down testing. Further development was cancelled before the aircraft was flown.

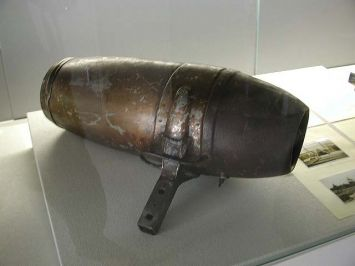
Ishikawajima - Harima Industry Ramjet (core unit) for Kayaba Heliplene Type-01

== Specifications (Heliplane) ==
Data from sjac.or.jp, Handbook of Japanese Aircraft and Model Art

General characteristics

- Crew: 1 or 2
- Capacity: 1 or 2
- Length: 7.4 m (24 ft 3 in) fuselage
- Wingspan: 2.74 m (9 ft 0 in) stub wings
- Height: 2.83 m (9 ft 3 in)
- Airfoil: NACA 2412
- Powerplant: 1 × Continental Motors air-cooled 6-cylinder horizontally-opposed piston engine E-190, 130 kW (180 hp)
- Powerplant: 3 × unknown rotor tip ramjet, 0.245 kN (55 lbf) thrust each
- Main rotor diameter: 11 m (36 ft 1 in)
- Main rotor area: 95 m^{2} (1,020 sq ft) three-bladed bonded metal rotor rotating at 310 rpm
- Propellers: 2-bladed wooden fixed pitch propeller

Performance

- Maximum speed: 170 km/h (110 mph, 92 kn) projected
- Cruise speed: 120 km/h (75 mph, 65 kn) projected
- Range: 360 km (220 mi, 190 nmi) projected
- Service ceiling: 4,000 m (13,000 ft) projected
