= Fairey FB-1 Gyrodyne =

Type of aircraft

FB-1 Gyrodyne
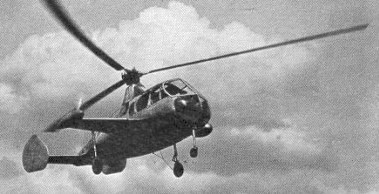
- The Fairey FB-1 Gyrodyne prototype in test

General information
- Type: Gyrodyne
- National origin: United Kingdom
- Manufacturer: Fairey
- Designer: Dr. J.A.J. Bennett
- Number built: 2

History
- First flight: 4 December 1947
- Retired: Cancelled 1949
- Variant: Fairey Jet Gyrodyne

The Fairey FB-1 Gyrodyne was an experimental British rotorcraft that used a single lifting rotor and a tractor propeller mounted on the tip of the starboard stub wing to provide both propulsion and anti-torque reaction. It was the first of a third type of rotorcraft, the gyrodyne.

== Design and development ==
In April 1946, Fairey announced a private-venture project for a rotary-wing aircraft, to be built to a design developed by Dr. J.A.J. Bennett while he was chief technical officer at the Cierva Autogiro Company in 1936–1939. The Gyrodyne, constituting a third distinct type of rotorcraft and designated C.41 by the Cierva Autogiro Company, was in 1938 successfully tendered to the Royal Navy in response to Specification S.22/38 for a naval helicopter. Though preliminary work started on the project, it was abandoned with the outbreak of the Second World War, and G & J Weir, Ltd., the financiers of the Cierva Autogiro Company, declined to undertake further development in addition to their successful experiments with the W.5 and W.6 lateral twin-rotor helicopters. After the Second World War, the Cierva Autogiro Company was engaged with the development of the Cierva W.9 "Drainpipe" and the W.11 Air Horse helicopters under the direction of Cyril Pullin, and Bennett joined Fairey in late 1945 as head of the newly established rotary wing aircraft division.

The FB-1 Gyrodyne was a compact, streamlined rotorcraft weighing just over 4,410 lb (2,000 kg) and powered by a 520–540 hp (390–400 kW) Alvis Leonides 522/2 radial engine, the power from which could be transmitted in variable ratios to the fixed-shaft/swashplate-actuated tilting hub-controlled rotor and the wing tip mounted propeller. The Gyrodyne possessed the hovering capability of a helicopter, while its propeller provided the necessary thrust for forward flight to enable its rotor, driven at low torque in cruise flight, to operate at low collective pitch with the tip-path plane parallel to the flight path to minimise vibration at high airspeed. Collective pitch was an automatic function of throttle setting and power loading of the propeller, which to maintain rpm diverted torque away from the rotor as airspeed increased.

A government contract to Specification E.4/46 was awarded for two prototypes with the first Fairey Gyrodyne exhibited as an almost complete airframe at White Waltham on 7 December 1946.

== Testing and evaluation ==
On 4 December 1947, the first of the two prototypes took off from White Waltham airfield, and continued to build up flying time until March 1948 when it was dismantled for a thorough examination. The second prototype, basically similar to the first but with more comfortable interior furnishings befitting its role as a passenger demonstrator, was flying by the time of the next SBAC Farnborough Airshow, in September 1948. The first prototype was reassembled and, following further test flying, took part in an attempt to set a new world helicopter speed record in a straight line.

On 28 June 1948, flown by test pilot Basil Arkell, the Gyrodyne made two flights in each direction over a low-altitude 2-mile-long (3.2 km) course at White Waltham, achieving 124 mph (200 km/h), enough to secure the record. A maximum airspeed of 133 mph (214 km/h) was achieved during the flight, keeping seven inches of boost in reserve in the event a rapid climb became necessary as the flight was conducted at an altitude of less than 100 ft (30 m) above the ground. An attempt was to be made in April 1949 to set a 62 mi (100 km) closed-circuit record, but two days before the date selected a poorly machined flapping link in the rotor hub failed during flight and resulted in the crash of the aircraft at Ufton, near Reading, killing the pilot, Foster H. Dixon and observer, Derek Garraway.

The Gyrodyne had been selected for use by the British Army for use in Malaya, beating both the Westland S.51 Dragonfly (a licence-built Sikorsky design) and the Bristol 171 Sycamore, with an order for six approved by the Treasury at the time of the accident. Though the Gyrodyne's projected performance was significantly better than that of the Dragonfly, and was expected to be in service earlier than the Sycamore, the crash of the first prototype delayed the development programme, and the Army, having no other choice, acquired three S.51 Dragonflies, followed by Sycamores at a later date.

== Second prototype ==
The second Gyrodyne was grounded during the accident investigation which determined flapping hinge retaining nut failure due to poor machining as the cause. The extensively modified second prototype, renamed Jet Gyrodyne, flew in January 1954. Though retaining the name "Gyrodyne", the Jet Gyrodyne was a compound gyroplane, and did not operate on the same principle as the original aircraft. It had a two-blade rotor manually controlled with cyclic and collective pitch mechanisms that acted directly on each rotor blade and was driven by tip jets fed with air from two compressors driven by the Alvis Leonides radial engine. Pusher propellers, one mounted at the tip of each stub wing, provided yaw control through differential collective pitch and thrust for forward flight. The Jet Gyrodyne was constructed to provide rotor drive and operational data for the Fairey Rotodyne compound gyroplane.

The Jet Gyrodyne is on display at the Museum of Berkshire Aviation, Woodley, Reading.

== Specifications (Fairey FB-1 Gyrodyne) ==
Data from Jane's, Flight 21 April 1949

General characteristics

- Crew: One
- Capacity: Four to five passengers
- Length: 25 ft 0 in (7.62 m) Fuselage nose to trailing edges of rudders
- Wingspan: 17 ft 8 in (5.38 m)
- Height: 10 ft 1 in (3.07 m)
- Airfoil: Wing: NACA 23018, Rotor blade root:NACA 23022, Rotor blade tip:NACA 23015
- Empty weight: 3,592 lb (1,629 kg)
- Max takeoff weight: 4,800 lb (2,177 kg)
- Fuel capacity: 50 imp gal (227.3 L; 60.0 US gal) fuel, 7 imp gal (31.8 L; 8.4 US gal) oil
- Powerplant: 1 × Alvis Leonides 522/2 9-cyl. air-cooled radial piston engine, 520 hp (390 kW) at 3,000 rpm
- Main rotor diameter: 51 ft 8.8 in (15.768 m)
- Main rotor area: 2,102 sq ft (195.3 m^{2})
- Propellers: 2-bladed Fairey type CP/2/H/2/48 variable pitch controlled by the pilots rudder pedals

Performance

- Maximum speed: 120 kn (140 mph, 230 km/h)
- Range: 216 nmi (248 mi, 399 km)
- Service ceiling: 10,010 ft (3,050 m)

== See also ==
Related development

- Fairey Jet Gyrodyne
- Fairey Rotodyne

Aircraft of comparable role, configuration, and era

- Lockheed AH-56 Cheyenne
- Piasecki 16H Pathfinder
- SNCASO Farfadet
- Eurocopter X3

Related lists

- List of rotorcraft
- List of VTOL aircraft
