= Miles Student =

M.100 Student
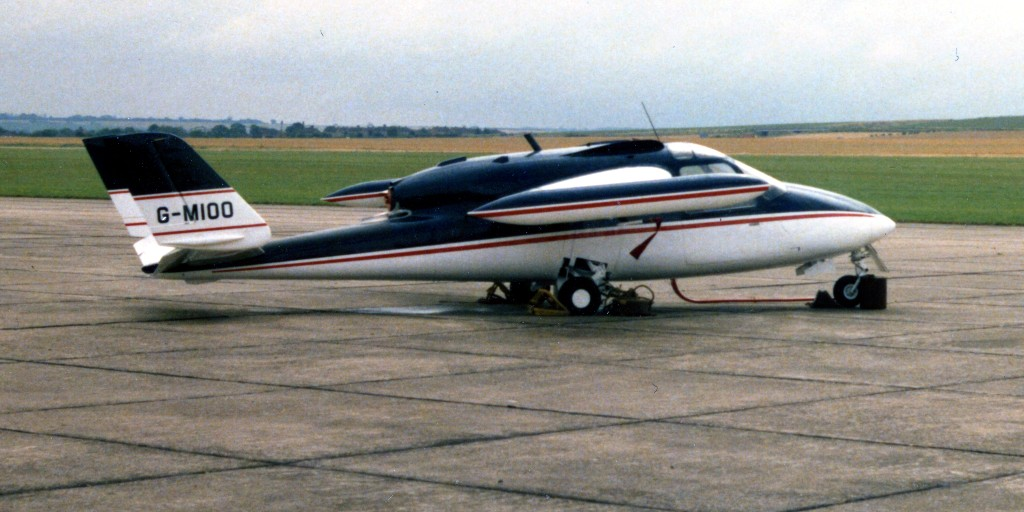
- Miles M-100 Student at Duxford c.1985

General information
- Type: Trainer
- Manufacturer: Miles Aircraft
- Designer: F.G. and G.H. Miles
- Status: preserved at the Museum of Berkshire Aviation.
- Primary user: Royal Air Force (intended)
- Number built: 1

History
- First flight: 15 May 1957

The Miles M.100 Student was built as a lightweight trainer as a private venture by F.G. and George Miles with development started in 1953. Although not specifically a Miles product, it was promoted as a British Royal Air Force trainer but failed to enter production.

== Design and development ==
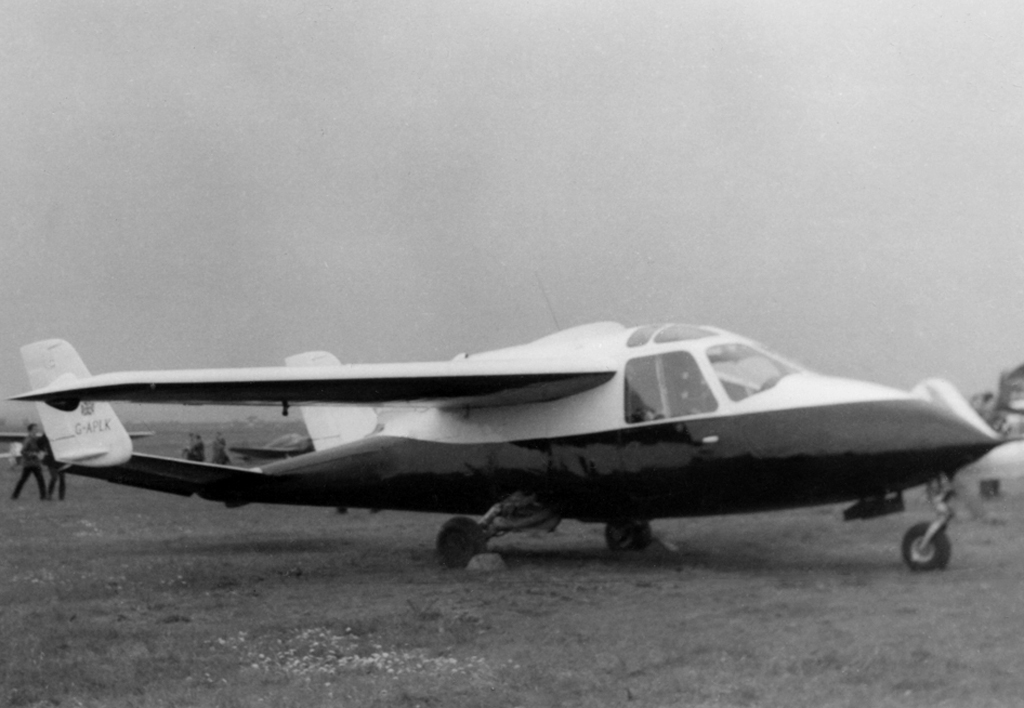
The Miles Student at Coventry airport in 1961 when owned by F.G. Miles Engineering

Building on the company's experience with the M.77 "Sparrowjet", the M.100 Student was a two-seat, side-by-side, all-metal jet trainer. The M.100 prototype was powered by a 400 kgf (882 lb) thrust Turbomeca Marbore turbojet and flew for the first time on 15 May 1957. Miles had hoped to secure an RAF order, but the contract went to the Jet Provost. The Student was proposed for several training programmes, but without success.

G-APLK, the sole aircraft, was allocated XS941 when developed in the Mark 2 version as a prospective Counter-insurgency type. It was tested by the Royal Air Force but was not accepted and therefore did not go into production.

The M.100 Student 2, re-registered G-MIOO, was badly damaged in a crash on 24 August 1985 and is now at the Museum of Berkshire Aviation.

The Centurion 3, 4 and 5 were planned variants with the RB.108, Gourdon and Arbizon engines respectively.

== Variants ==
Data from:' Jane's All the World's Aircraft 1958-59

M.100 Mk.1 Student: 880 lbf (3,914.44 N) Blackburn-Turbomeca Marboré IIA engine; sole prototype G-APLK / XS491.
M.100 Mk.2 Student: 1,025 lbf (4,559.43 N) Continental J69 engine; G-APLK re-registered as G-MIOO.
M.100 Mk.3 Centurion: 1,400 lbf (6,227.51 N) Rolls-Royce RB.108 engine (de-rated); not built.
M.100 Mk.4 Centurion: 1,405 lbf (6,249.75 N) Turbomeca Gourdon engine; not built.
M.100 Mk.5 Centurion: 2x 550 lbf (2,446.52 N) Turbomeca Arbizon engines; not built.

== Specifications (M.100 Mk.1 Student) ==
Data from Jet Age:The Miles Sparrowjet and Student, Jane's All the World's Aircraft 1958-59

General characteristics

- Crew: 2
- Length: 31 ft 6 in (9.60 m)
- Wingspan: 29 ft 2 in (8.89 m)
- Height: 6 ft 3 in (1.91 m)
- Wing area: 144 sq ft (13.4 m^{2})
- Airfoil: NACA 23015
- Empty weight: 2,400 lb (1,089 kg)
- Gross weight: 3,900 lb (1,769 kg) (with tip tanks)
- Fuel capacity: 100 imp gal (120 US gal; 455 L) in 4 wing tanks, with provision for two 20 imp gal (24 US gal; 91 L) wing-tip tanks
- Powerplant: 1 × Blackburn-built Turboméca Marboré IIA turbojet, 880 lbf (3.9 kN) thrust

Performance

- Maximum speed: 298 mph (480 km/h, 259 kn) at 20,000 ft (6,100 m)
- Range: 620 mi (1,000 km, 540 nmi) with tip tanks
- Time to altitude: 10,000 ft (3,048 m) in 6 minutes 48 seconds

== See also ==
Related development

- M.77 "Sparrowjet"
