= Turbomeca Arbizon =

1970s French turbojet engine

TR281 Arbizon
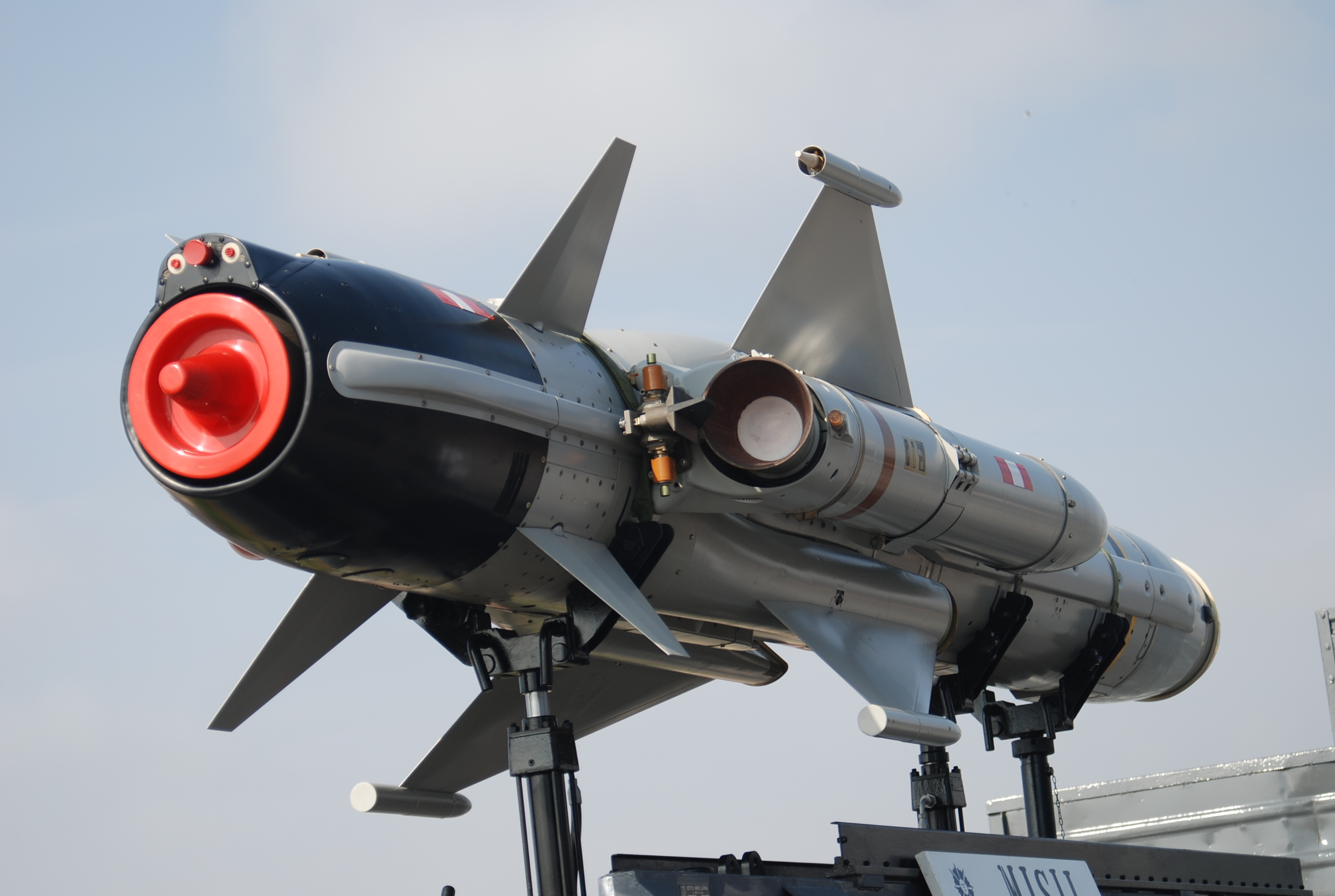
- Rear-installation on an Otomat missile, protective cover fitted
- Type: Turbojet
- National origin: France
- Manufacturer: Turbomeca
- First run: c. 1970
- Major applications: Otomat
- Developed from: Turbomeca Turmo

The Turbomeca Arbizon is a small turbojet engine used to power the Otomat anti-shipping missile. Developed from the Turbomeca Turmo the Arbizon was first made public in 1970 by the French manufacturer Turbomeca, by 1978 the engine had been improved to produce just over 3.5 kN thrust (800 lbf) with a stated service life of 30 hours.

== Applications ==
- Miles Student (intended application)
- Otomat

== Variants ==
Arbizon IIIB
Initial variant.
Arbizon IV
Smaller and lighter variant producing 3.3 kN (741 lbf).

== Specifications (Arbizon IIIB) ==
Data from Jane's All the World's Aircraft 1982-83.

==== General characteristics ====
- Type: turbojet
- Length: 1,361 mm (53.58 in)
- Diameter: 405 mm (15.95 in)
- Dry weight: 115 kg (253 lb)

==== Components ====
- Compressor: single-stage axial, single-stage centrifugal
- Turbine: single-stage

==== Performance ====
- Maximum thrust: 3.73 kN (836 lbf) at 33,000 rpm
- Overall pressure ratio: 5.5:1
- Air mass flow: 6 kg/s (13.2 lb/s)
- Specific fuel consumption: 31.44 mg/Ns (1.11 lb/hr/lbf)
- Thrust-to-weight ratio: 3.31

== See also ==
Related development

- Turbomeca Turmo

Comparable engines

- Williams F107

Related lists

- List of aircraft engines
