= GBA-DARPA Heliplane =

Heliplane
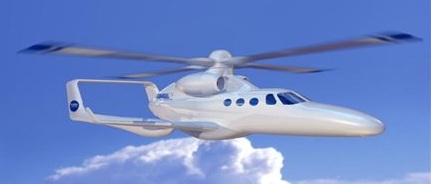
- Image of baseline GBA-DARPA Heliplane concept, showing its free-spinning rotor, which is fitted with integral tipjets, fed with bypass air from two Williams gas-turbine propulsion engines

General information
- Type: Experimental helicopter
- National origin: United States
- Manufacturer: Groen Brothers Aviation
- Status: Canceled

The GBA-DARPA Heliplane was a proof-of-concept, long-range, VTOL aircraft intended to cruise at twice the speed of conventional helicopters. It was funded by the Defense Advanced Research Projects Agency (DARPA) and designed by Groen Brothers Aviation (GBA), which has since been re-branded as Skyworks Global.

== Development ==
DARPA's objective was to achieve performance with a rotary-wing aircraft comparable to that of a fixed-wing plane. The concept combined technical aspects of a gyroplane, which GBA had been working on since the late 1980s, with a fixed-wing business jet.

The work was part of a potential multi-year, US$40-million, four-phase program. GBA, along with Georgia Tech, Adams Aircraft Industries, and Williams International, worked on Phase 1 of that program, a 15-month effort funded at $6.4 million. Phase 1B of the program was managed by Georgia Tech, using GBA as a subcontractor. Phase 2 development was to include a "subscale wind tunnel demonstration in the high-speed, high-altitude wind tunnel at NASA Langley and the building of a full-scale tipjet nozzle. Phase 2 [was] anticipated to be a substantially bigger undertaking (valued at $24-28 million)."

Due to issues with noise generated by the tipjets, the program was terminated by DARPA in 2008.

In 2012, Groen Brothers Aviation was acquired by investor Steve Stevanovich as it was collapsing and nearly bankrupt, and was renamed Skyworks Global in 2017. In July 2019, Skyworks partnered with Northrop Grumman-owned Scaled Composites to develop a VertiJet gyrocopter prototype, aiming for a 348kn (644 km/h) cruise and a 1,000nmi (1,850 km) range; it was projected that the aircraft would fly within 18–24 months. Intended to fulfil the US Marine Corps’ armed escort requirements disclosed in April 2019 for a rotorcraft that could match the performance of the Bell Boeing V-22 Osprey; it was also projected that a commercial gyrocopter carrying four passengers could be built for less than $10 million.

== See also ==
- Fairey Rotodyne
