= Cessna 170 =

United States of America light aircraft

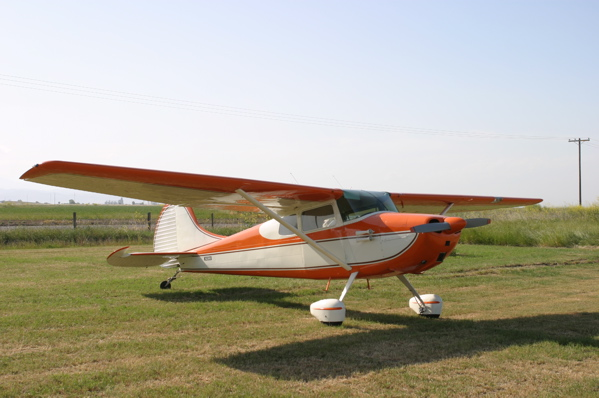

General information
- Type: Light personal aircraft
- Manufacturer: Cessna Aircraft Company
- Number built: 5,174

History
- Manufactured: 1948–1956
- Introduction date: 1948
- First flight: June 1, 1948
- Variants: O-1 Bird Dog; Cessna 172; Kayaba Heliplane

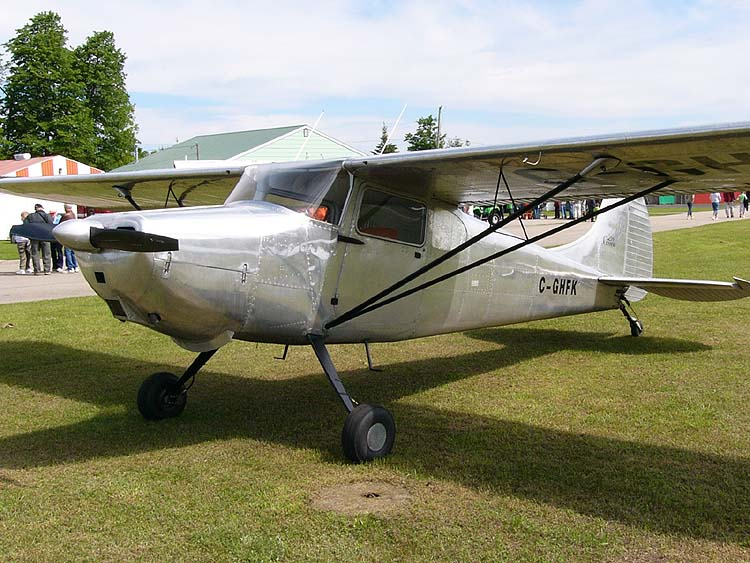
Early production Cessna 170

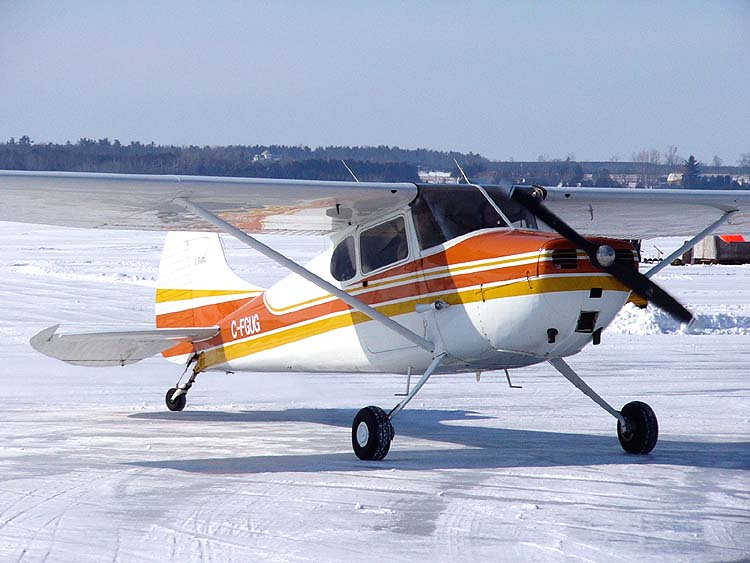
Cessna 170A on an ice runway near Ottawa, Ontario

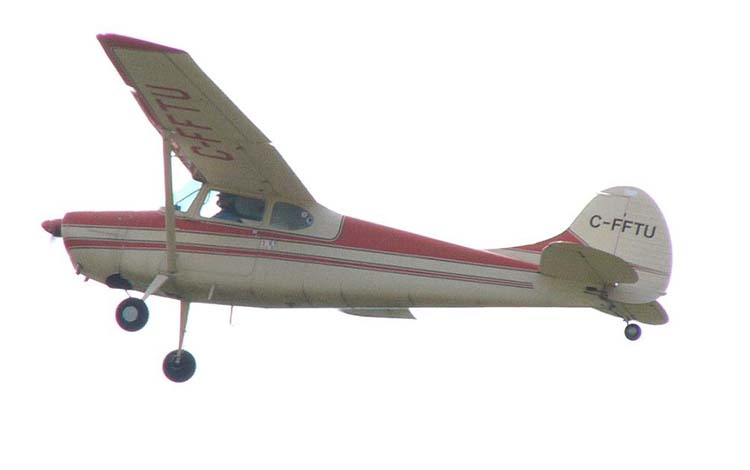
Cessna 170B in flight

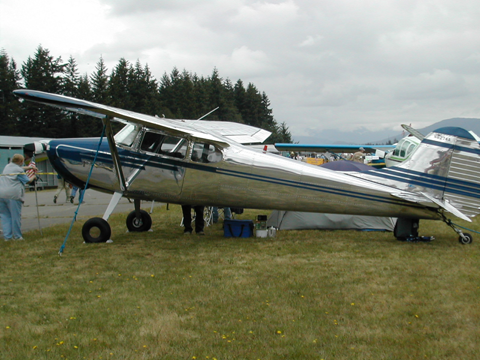
Cessna 170B

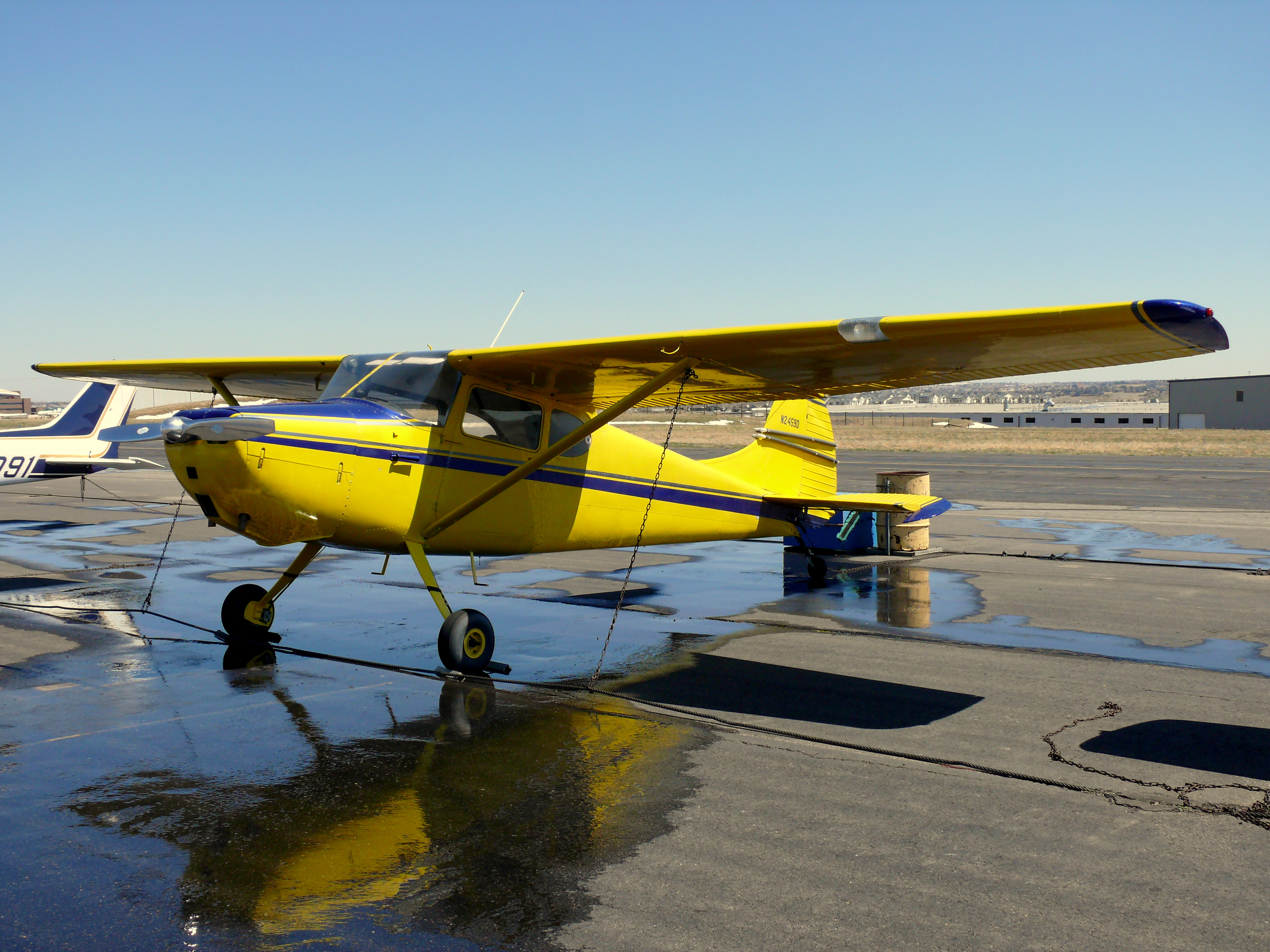
Cessna 170B at Centennial Airport

The Cessna 170 is an American single-engine, four seat, general aviation aircraft produced by the Cessna Aircraft Company between 1948 and 1956.

It is the predecessor of the Cessna 172, the most produced aircraft in history, which replaced the 170 in production in 1956.

== Development ==
=== 170 ===
In late 1948, Cessna began sales of the 170, with a metal fuselage and tail and fabric-covered constant-chord wings. These earliest 170s were four-seat versions of the popular 140 with a more powerful 145 hp (108 kW) Continental C145-2 (later renamed the O-300) and an extra interconnected fuel tank in one wing for a total of 36 gallons in three tanks. Like the 140, they were constructed of metal with fabric-covered wings supported by a "V" strut.

=== 170A ===
In 1949, Cessna began marketing the 170A, an all-metal 170 with zero-dihedral wing tapered outboard of the slightly-enlarged plain flaps with 50 degrees maximum deflection, two 21 gallon fuel tanks, and a single strut replacing the "V" strut of the 170. This and subsequent versions of the 170 shared the fin/rudder shape of the larger Cessna 190 and 195 models.

=== 305 ===
In 1950, the United States Air Force, Army and Marines began using the military variant of the 170, the Model 305, designated the L-19 and later O-1 Bird Dog by the military. It was used as a forward air control and reconnaissance aircraft. The Bird Dog was extensively redesigned from the basic 170 and included a revised tandem-seat fuselage and a wing with large modified Fowler flaps that deployed up to 60°.

=== 170B ===
In 1952, the Cessna 170B was introduced, featuring a new wing tapered outboard of the flaps, incorporating dihedral similar to the military version. The B model was equipped with very effective modified Fowler (slotted, rearward-traveling) wing flaps which deflect up to 40°, adapted from the C-305/Bird Dog, a wing design that lives on in the Cessna light singles of today (constant NACA 2412 section with a chord of 64 inches (1,600 mm) from centerline to 100 inches (2,500 mm) (the outboard end of the flaps), then tapering to 44-inch (1,100 mm) NACA 2412 section chord at 208 inches from centerline, with three-degree washout across the tapered section). The 170B model also included a new tailplane, a revised tailwheel bracket, and other refinements over the 170 and 170A. It was marketed in 1952 for $7245.

In 1955, the previously elliptical rear side windows were changed to a squarer design.

=== 170C ===
The sole 170C, registered N37892 (c/n 609), was built in November 1954 with a redesigned squared vertical stabilizer. No production followed, and the prototype was converted to 170B standard with a rounded tail in January 1956. However, the 170C was developed into the Cessna 172, with early models sharing the squared tail of the 170C.

=== Experimental ===
In 1958, Cessna experimented with a belt driven 145 hp Continental engine. The company completed 1000 hours of test flying. The belt drive reduced vibration, engine noise and propeller noise. A 92 inch propeller with 70 degrees of pitch improved the rate of climb 12 percent. The belts used were developed by Goodyear Tire and Rubber Company and were 3/8-inch wide, 7/16-inch deep, and 41 inches long.

=== Successor ===
The 170 is equipped with conventional landing gear, which is more challenging to land than tricycle landing gear. In 1956, Cessna introduced a replacement for the 170 that was essentially a nosewheel-equipped 170B with a square tailfin, designated the 172. 170 production was halted soon after the 172 became available.

=== Model 309 and 319 ===
Between 1951 and 1955, Cessna used modifications of the 170 and its derivative, the U.S. Army L-19, as test beds for boundary layer control research, under contract to the Office of Naval Research and the Army Transportation Corps, designating them as the models 309 and 319. The project was done in conjunction with the University of Wichita which conducted extensive wind tunnel tests of the concept. The model 309 utilized the German World War II Arado lift-increasing system in which a jet pump inside the wing sucked in stagnant air from the flap area, energized it and blew the higher-speed air over the ailerons. Various chemicals and enhancements were used to power the jet pump. Better results were obtained by departing from the Arado jet pump method and using an engine-driven generator to power electric motors driving axial fans to move the internal air.

This concept was adopted on the Model 319 but substituted an engine-driven hydraulic pump to drive hydraulic-powered axial fans. This model was more successful and resulted in the highest lift capacity, as measured by the maximum lift coefficient, recorded up to that time. The 319 demonstrated the capability of taking off in 190 ft (58 m), landing in 160 ft (49 m) and clearing a 50 ft (15 m) obstacle in 450 ft (137 m). The aircraft had a stall speed of 28 kn (52 km/h). The 309 and 319 were meant to be research aircraft only, and no plans were developed to incorporate boundary layer control technology in then-current Cessna models. Others were also working on the concept, and it was ultimately incorporated into the Lockheed F-104 Starfighter.

== Operators ==
=== Civilian ===
United States

- Mississippi State University – Model 319

=== Military ===
Dominican Republic

- Dominican Army

El Salvador

- Salvadoran Air Force

Guatemala

- Guatemalan Air Force

Honduras

- Honduran Air Force

Thailand

- Royal Thai Armed Forces – Cessna 170B, locally designated B.S.7 (Thai: บ.ส.๗).

== Specifications (170B) ==
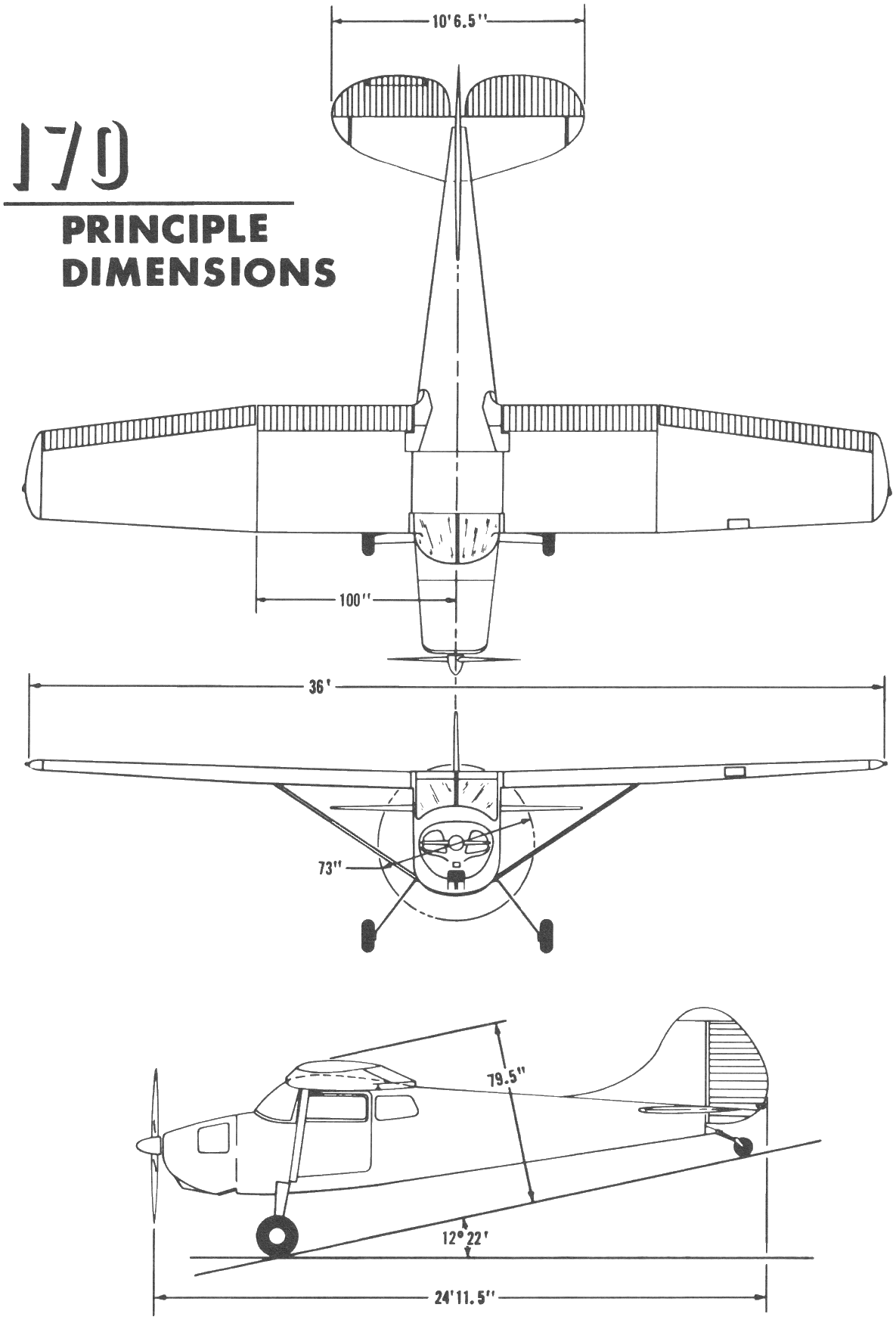
3-view line drawing of the Cessna 170B

Data from Jane's All The World's Aircraft 1955–56

General characteristics

- Crew: 1
- Capacity: 3 passengers
- Length: 24 ft 11 1/2 in (7.607 m)
- Wingspan: 36 ft (11 m)
- Height: 6 ft 7 in (2.01 m)
- Wing area: 174 sq ft (16.2 m^{2})
- Aspect ratio: 7.46:1
- Airfoil: NACA 2412
- Empty weight: 1,205 lb (547 kg)
- Gross weight: 2,200 lb (998 kg)
- Fuel capacity: 42 US gal (160 L; 35 imp gal)
- Powerplant: 1 × Continental C145-2 air-cooled flat-six, 145 hp (108 kW)

Performance

- Maximum speed: 140 mph (230 km/h, 120 kn)
- Cruise speed: 120 mph (190 km/h, 100 kn)
- Stall speed: 52 mph (84 km/h, 45 kn)
- Endurance: over 4.5 hours
- Service ceiling: 15,500 ft (4,700 m)
- Rate of climb: 690 ft/min (3.5 m/s)

== See also ==
- 1948 in aviation (first flight)

Related development

- Cessna 140
- Cessna 172
- Cessna O-1 Bird Dog

Aircraft of comparable role, configuration, and era

- Aeronca Sedan
- Piper PA-20 Pacer
- Stinson 108
- Yakovlev Yak-12
