= Rotary Air Force RAF 2000 =

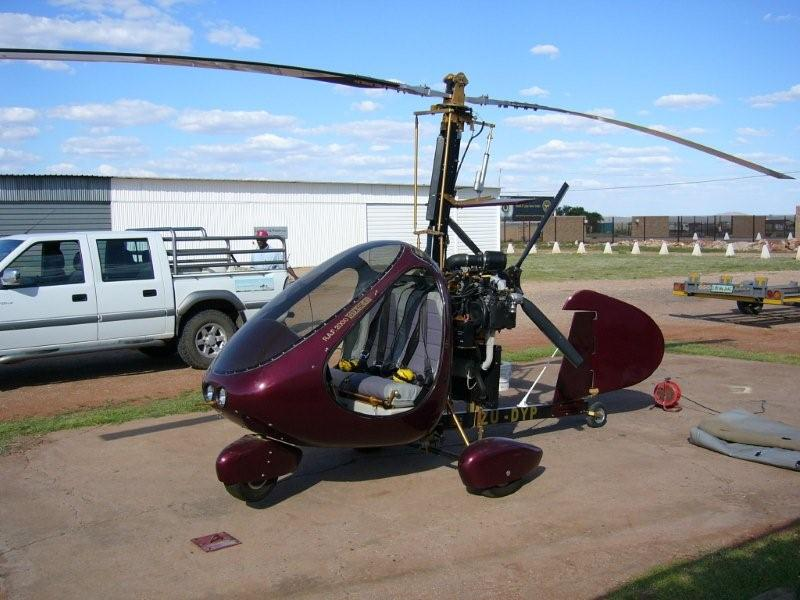

General information
- Type: Two-seat kit built autogyro
- Manufacturer: Rotary Air Force, UMRTC Eben Mocke
- Designer: Bernard J Haseloh
- Primary user: Private, recreational, flight training

The RAF 2000 is a two-seat kit built autogyro that was designed by Bernard J. Haseloh. Kits were first manufactured by Rotary Air Force Marketing Inc. in Canada. The marketing and manufacturing rights were sold to the Mocke Family in Upington, Northern Cape, South Africa in April 2007. They formed UMRTC Eben Mocke to produce the aircraft design.

The RAF 2000 is one of only a few autogyros with type approval from the Light Aircraft Association in the United Kingdom.

== Development ==
The RAF 2000 was a development of the single seat RAF 1000 and was designed primarily by Bernard J Haseloh. The aircraft kits were manufactured by Rotary Air Force Inc of Canada until April 2007 when the marketing and manufacturing rights were transferred to UMRTC Eben Mocke located in Upington, South Africa.

As a result of test flying in the UK the RAF 2000 has been documented as being subject to Power Push Over (PPO), whereby the thrust line is above the aircraft's vertical centre of gravity. This results in a power application causing a nose-down pitching moment and increases the risk of tail to main rotor contact.

== Design ==
The RAF 2000 is unusual amongst autogyros in that it does not have a horizontal tailplane – although aftermarket horizontal tailplanes are available.

Like almost all UK-approved amateur-built designs the RAF 2000 is subject to Civil Aviation Authority Mandatory Permit Directives, similar to airworthiness directives for certified aircraft. As of January 2010 these MPDs include repetitive inspections for rotor blade cracks, a one time installation of an emergency egress placard, a one time replacement of control system components and a one time inspection of rudder cables. As a result of a fatal accident the CAA issued an MPD in 2009 which indicates that the design does not fully comply with the required BCAR Section T and that as a result unmodified aircraft are subject to a number of restrictions including flight with doors being prohibited, V_{NE} limited to 70 mph and crosswind limited to 7 knots for take-off and landing, maximum 15 knots windspeed with a 10 knot gust spread are prohibited from flight in moderate or higher turbulence. Many of these restrictions can be removed by modifying the aircraft with a tailplane/rudder centring spring and new doors, although the 70 mph V_{NE} is retained on both modified and unmodified aircraft flown in the UK.

== Legal actions ==
The RAF 2000 has been the subject of a number of legal actions. In Frost v. Rotary Air Force Marketing, Inc. the company successfully defended a suit for the death of a builder, by showing that he had contractually agreed to get specific training and had failed to do so prior to flight and in fact did not even have a pilot's certificate at the time of the crash.

In 2005 a lawsuit was filed in a Michigan court regarding the death of Ken Becker, who had purchased a used kit from a previous buyer, and failed to contact RAFM to receive the mandatory flight training required of all RAF2000 kit builders. Due to the high costs of defending against the US litigation, estimated at over US$250,000, the company could not afford to defend itself and the suit was decided by default. The company indicated that "slander" arising from the lawsuit resulted in a loss of gyroplane sales, leaving nothing for the plaintiff to collect and the resulting "sale" of the company.

== Variants ==
Three variants are currently available. The primary difference between them is the engine.

RAF 2000 GTX SE
Equipped with a 130 hp (97 kW) Subaru flat four carburetted engine
RAF 2000 GTX SE FI
Equipped with similar fuel injected engine which is more economical, and obviates "carb heat".
RAF 2000 GTX SE FI 2.5
Equipped with a more powerful 165 hp (123 kW) Subaru fuel injected engine.

== Specifications (RAF 2000 GTX SE) ==
Data from Manufacturer's web site

General characteristics

- Capacity: 2
- Length: 13 ft 7 in (4.15 m)
- Width: 5 ft 0 in (1.53 m)
- Height: 8 ft 6 in (2.59 m)
- Empty weight: 790 lb (358 kg)
- Gross weight: 1,540 lb (698 kg)
- Powerplant: 1 × Subaru flat-four piston engine , 130 hp (97 kW)

Performance

- Maximum speed: 120 mph (194 km/h, 100 kn)
- Cruise speed: 80 mph (130 km/h, 70 kn)
- Endurance: 4.6 hours
- Rate of climb: 1,200 ft/min (6.1 m/s)
