= Groen Hawk 4 =

Hawk 4
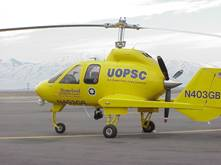
- The turboprop powered second prototype.

General information
- Type: Four seat autogyro
- National origin: United States
- Manufacturer: Skyworks Global Inc
- Number built: 3

History
- First flight: 4 February 1997 (H2X)
- Variant: Groen ShadowHawk

The Groen Hawk 4 was a single engine, pusher configuration, four seat autogyro built in the United States in the late 1990s. Three prototypes, two piston engined and one turboprop powered, were flown but the Hawk did not go into production.

== Design and development ==
Design work on the Hawk utility/passenger autogyro began in 1996 and the first prototype, the two seat H2X, first flew on 4 February 1997. It was later modified to include a third seat and renamed the Hawk III. The production prototype, a four-seater named the Hawk 4, was significantly different from the Hawk III in detail but retained the pod and mid-line pusher engine configuration, combined with low stub wings, twin booms and fins. Changes between the Hawk III and 4, apart from cabin revisions to accommodate the extra seat, included a new constant chord, aluminium rotor in place of the earlier tapered, composite blade. The rotor was also lowered and the pitch control levers enclosed within a shallower fairing. The wings and fixed tailplane were cropped, so that they no longer extended beyond the booms and fins, the rudders were shortened so that the tailplane no longer needed cut-outs for their movement and extra, short, inboard rudders were added. Successive engine changes nearly doubled its power.

The Hawk 4 had a steel rotor mast and engine mountings but was mostly aluminium elsewhere, including the rotor, rotor head and propeller. The fuselage was an aluminium semi-monocoque. Some components, such as the nosecone, engine cowling and cabin door were formed from composite materials. The rotor was a semi-rigid or teetering design with a swash plate, rotating at up to 270 rpm. Yaw was jointly controlled by the balanced rudders on the endplate fins and the all-moving inboard rudders. It had a fixed, tricycle undercarriage with mainwheels mounted at the tips of the stub wings. Two rows of seats accommodated the pilot and up to three passengers; alternatively, the rear seats could be folded to provide baggage space.

The Hawk 4 was powered by a 261 kW (350 hp) Continental TSIO-550 air cooled flat-six piston engine, which provided pre-rotation power to the rotor for jump starts and drove a four blade propeller in forward flight. The Hawk 4 first flew on 29 September 1999 and had logged 120 hours by the following April. A second aircraft, initially designated Hawk 4T and powered by a 313 kW (420 hp) Rolls-Royce 250-B17C turboprop driving a three blade propeller first flew on 12 July 2000. It was redesignated Hawk 4 when development of the piston engine version was dropped. It had a taller undercarriage, high set tailplane, endplate fins with rounded extensions below the tailbooms and modifications to the inboard rudders. The Hawk 5 was a planned five seat development. Despite optimistic sales predictions before the 2000 recession, the Hawk did not reach production.

== Operational history ==
In 2002, the Winter Olympic Games contracted with GBA to provide aerial security over Salt Lake International Airport. The Hawk 4 second prototype bearing the acronym UOPSC (Utah Olympic Public Safety Command) was used for this assignment.

== Specifications (Hawk 4, piston engine) ==
Data from Jane's All the World's Aircraft 2000/1

General characteristics

- Crew: 4
- Length: 22 ft 0 in (6.71 m) fuselage
- Height: 10 ft 0 in (3.05 m) to top or rotor head
- Empty weight: 1,841 lb (835 kg)
- Max takeoff weight: 2,800 lb (1,270 kg)
- Fuel capacity: 284 L (75 US gal; 62 Im gal)
- Powerplant: 1 × Continental TSIO-550 air cooled flat-six piston, 350 hp (261 kW)
- Main rotor diameter: 42 ft 0 in (12.80 m)
- Main rotor area: 1,385.4 sq ft (128.71 m^{2})
- Propellers: 4-bladed MTV, 6 ft 4 in (1.93 m) diameter constant speed

Performance

- Maximum speed: 140 mph (225 km/h, 121 kn)
- Cruise speed: 130 mph (209 km/h, 113 kn) at 75% power
- Never exceed speed: 150 mph (240 km/h, 130 kn)
- Range: 600 mi (965 km, 521 nmi) 75% power, maximum fuel
- Service ceiling: 15,994 ft (4,875 m)
- Rate of climb: 1,500 ft/min (7.6 m/s)
- Disk loading: 2.02 lb/sq ft (9.87 kg/m^{2}) maximum
- Take-off to 15 m (50 ft): 46 m (150 ft)
- Landing from 15 m (50 ft): 46 m (150 ft)
