= Fairey Rotodyne =

1950s British compound gyroplane

Rotodyne
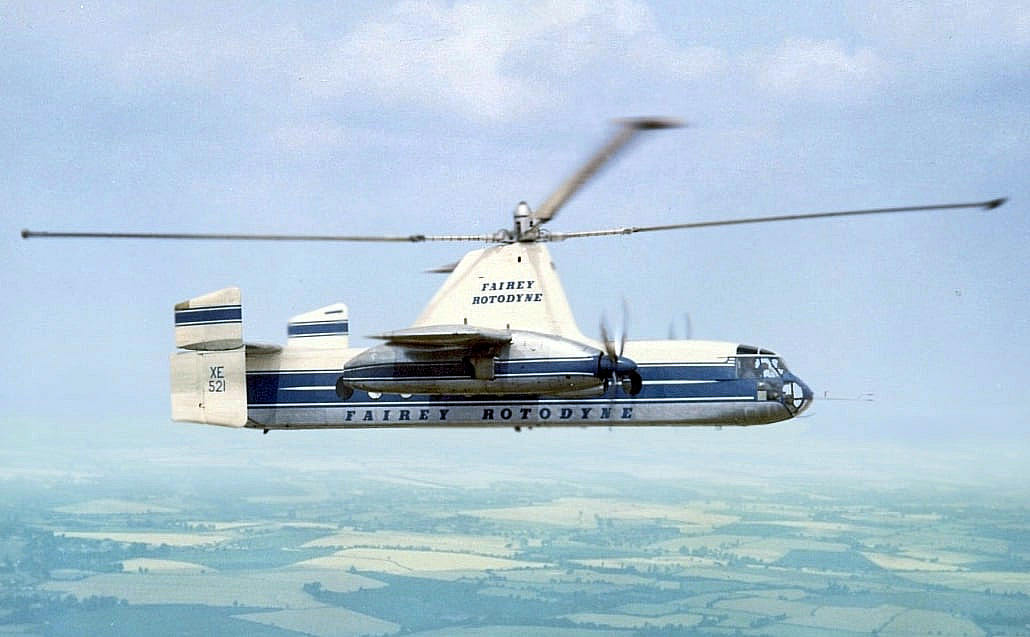
- Rotodyne XE521 in flight

General information
- Type: Compound gyroplane
- National origin: United Kingdom
- Manufacturer: Fairey Aviation
- Status: Cancelled 1962
- Number built: 1

History
- First flight: 6 November 1957
- Developed from: Fairey Jet Gyrodyne

The Fairey Rotodyne was a 1950s British compound gyroplane designed and built by Fairey Aviation and intended for commercial and military uses. A development of the earlier Fairey Jet Gyrodyne, which had established a world helicopter speed record, the Rotodyne featured a tip-jet-powered rotor that burned a mixture of fuel and compressed air bled from two wing-mounted Napier Eland turboprops. The rotor was driven for vertical takeoffs, landings and hovering, as well as low-speed translational flight, but autorotated during cruise flight with all engine power applied to two propellers.

One prototype was built. Although the Rotodyne was promising in concept and successful in trials, the programme was eventually cancelled. The termination has been attributed to the type failing to attract any commercial orders; this was in part due to concerns over the high levels of rotor tip jet noise generated in flight. Politics had also played a role in the lack of orders (the project was government-funded) which ultimately doomed the project.

== Development ==
=== Background ===
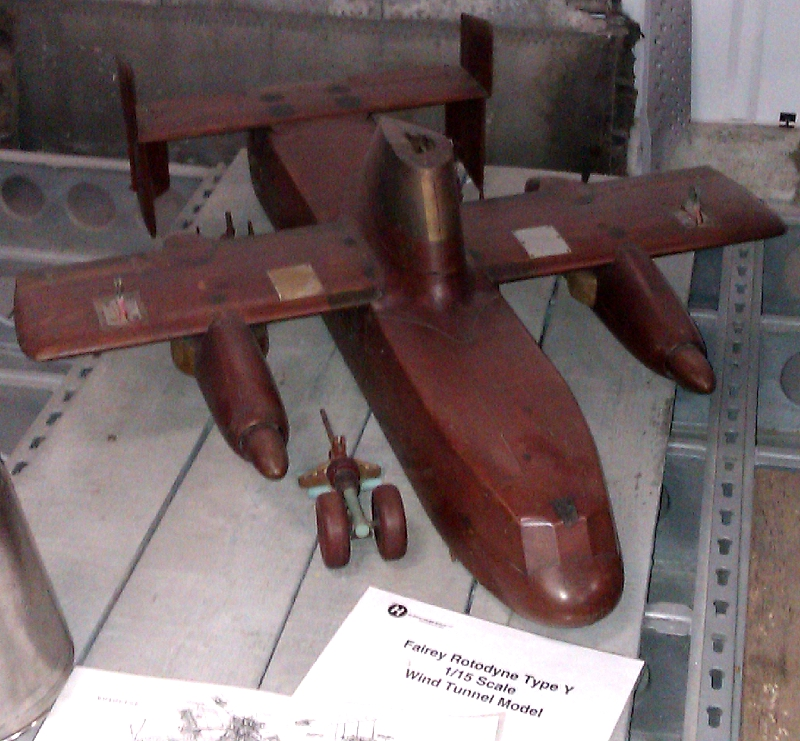
A wind tunnel model of the Fairey Rotodyne, The Helicopter Museum, 2011

From the late 1930s onwards, considerable progress was made on an entirely new field of aeronautics in the form of rotary-wing aircraft. While some progress in Britain had been made prior to the outbreak of the Second World War, wartime priorities placed upon the aviation industry meant that British programmes to develop rotorcraft and helicopters were marginalised at best. In the immediate post-war climate, the Royal Air Force (RAF) and Royal Navy elected to procure American-developed helicopters in the form of the Sikorsky R-4 and Sikorsky R-6, known locally as the Hoverfly I and Hoverfly II respectively. Experience from the operation of these rotorcraft, along with the extensive examination that was conducted upon captured German helicopter prototypes, stimulated considerable interest within the armed services and industry alike in developing Britain's own advanced rotorcraft.

Fairey Aviation was one such company that was intrigued by the potential of rotary-wing aircraft, and proceeded to develop the Fairey FB-1 Gyrodyne in accordance with Specification E.16/47. The Gyrodyne was a unique aircraft in its own right that defined a third type of rotorcraft, including autogyro and helicopter. Having little in common with the later Rotodyne, it was characterised by its inventor, Dr JAJ Bennett, formerly chief technical officer of the pre-Second World War Cierva Autogiro Company as an intermediate aircraft designed to combine the safety and simplicity of the autogyro with hovering performance. Its rotor was driven in all phases of flight with collective pitch being an automatic function of shaft torque, with a side-mounted propeller providing both thrust for forward flight and rotor torque correction. On 28 June 1948, the FB-1 proved its potential during test flights when it achieved a world airspeed record, having attaining a recorded speed of 124.3 mph (200.0 km/h). The programme was not trouble-free however, a fatal accident involving one of the prototypes occurring in April 1949 due to poor machining of a rotor blade flapping link retaining nut. The second FB-1 was modified to investigate a tip-jet driven rotor with propulsion provided by propellers mounted at the tip of each stub wing, being renamed the Jet Gyrodyne.

During 1951 and 1952, British European Airways (BEA) internally formulated its own requirement for a passenger-carrying rotorcraft, commonly referred to the Bealine-Bus or BEA Bus. This was to be a multi-engined rotorcraft capable of serving as a short-haul airliner, BEA envisioned the type as being typically flown between major cities and carrying a minimum of 30 passengers in order to be economical; keen to support the initiative, the Ministry of Supply proceeded to sponsor a series of design studies to be conducted in support of the BEA requirement. Both civil and government bodies had predicted the requirement for such rotorcraft, and viewed it as being only a matter of time before they would become commonplace in Britain's transport network.

The BEA Bus requirement was met with a variety of futuristic proposals; both practical and seemingly impractical submissions were made by a number of manufacturers. Amongst these, Fairey had also chosen to submit its designs and to participate to meet the requirement; according to aviation author Derek Wood: "one design, particularly, seemed to show promise and this was the Fairey Rotordyne". Fairey had produced multiple arrangements and configurations for the aircraft, typically varying in the powerplants used and the internal capacity; the firm made its first submission to the Ministry on 26 January 1949. Within two months, Fairey had produced a further three alternative submissions, centring on the use of engines such as the Rolls-Royce Dart and Armstrong Siddeley Mamba. In October 1950, an initial contract for the development of a 16,000-pound (7,260 kg), four-bladed rotorcraft was awarded. The Fairey design, which was considerably revised over the years, received government funding to support its development.

Early on in development, Fairey found that securing access to engines to power its design proved to be difficult. In November 1950, Rolls-Royce chairman Lord Hives protested that the design resources of his company were being stretched too thinly across multiple projects; accordingly, the initially selected Dart engine was switched to the Mamba engine of rival firm Armstrong Siddeley. By July 1951, Fairey had re-submitted proposals using the Mamba engine in two and three-engine layouts, supporting all-up weights of 20,000 and 30,000 lb (9,100 and 13,600 kg) respectively; the adopted configuration of pairing the Mamba engine to auxiliary compressors was known as the Cobra. Due to complaints by Armstrong Siddeley that it too was lacking resources, Fairey also proposed the alternative use of engines such as the de Havilland Goblin and the Rolls-Royce Derwent turbojet to drive the forward propellers.

Fairey did not enjoy a positive relationship with de Havilland however, so instead they chose to use D. Napier & Son and its Eland turboshaft engine in April 1953. Following the selection of the Eland, the basic design of the rotorcraft, known as the Rotodyne Y, soon emerged; it was powered by a pair of Eland N.El.3 engines furnished with auxiliary compressors and a large-section four-blade main rotor, with a projected all-up weight of 33,000 lb (15,000 kg). At the same time, a projected enlarged version, designated as the Rotodyne Z, outfitted with more powerful Eland N.El.7 engines and an all-up weight of 39,000 lb (18,000 kg), was proposed as well.

=== Contract ===
In April 1953, the Ministry of Supply contracted for the building of a single prototype of the Rotodyne Y, powered by the Eland engine, later designated with the serial number XE521, for research purposes. As contracted, the Rotodyne would have been the largest transport helicopter of its day, seating a maximum of 40 to 50 passengers, while possessing a cruise speed of 150 mph (240 km/h) and a range of 250 nautical miles (460 kilometres). At the time of the award, Fairey had estimated that £710,000 would cover the costs of producing the airframe. With a view to an aircraft that would meet regulatory approval in the shortest time, Fairey's designers worked to meet the Civil Airworthiness Requirements for both helicopters and similar-sized twin-engined aircraft. A one-sixth scale rotorless model was extensively wind tunnel tested for fixed-wing performance. A smaller (1/15th-scale) model with a powered rotor was used for downwash investigations.

While the prototype was being built, funding for the programme reached a crisis. Cuts in defence spending led the Ministry of Defence to withdraw its support, pushing the burden of the costs onto any possible civilian customer. The government agreed to maintain funding for the project only if, among other qualifications, Fairey and Napier (through their parent English Electric) contributed to development costs of the Rotodyne and the Eland engine respectively. As a result of disagreements with Fairey on matters of policy, Dr Bennett left the firm to join Hiller Helicopters in California; responsibility for the Rotodyne's development was assumed by Dr George S Hislop, who became the firm's chief engineer.

The manufacturing of the prototype's fuselage, wings, and rotor assembly was conducted at Fairey's facility in Hayes, Hillingdon, West London, while construction of the tail assembly was performed at the firm's factory in Stockport, Greater Manchester and final assembly was performed at White Waltham Airfield, Maidenhead. In addition, a full-scale static test rig was produced at RAF Boscombe Down to support the programme; the static rig featured a fully operational rotor and powerplant arrangement which was demonstrated on multiple occasions, including a 25-hour approval testing for the Ministry.

While construction of the first prototype was underway, prospects for the Rotodyne appeared positive; according to Wood, there was interest in the type from both civil and military quarters. BEA was monitoring the progress of the programme with interest; it was outwardly expected that the airline would place an order shortly after the issuing of an order for a militarised version of the rotorcraft. The American company Kaman Helicopters also showed strong interest in the project, and was known to have studied it closely as the firm considered the potential for licensed production of the Rotodyne for both civil and military customers.

Due to army and RAF interest, development of the Rotodyne had been funded out of the defence budget for a time. During 1956, the Defence Research Policy Committee had declared that there was no military interest in the type, which quickly led to the Rotodyne becoming solely reliant upon civil budgets as a research/civil prototype aircraft instead. After a series of political arguments, proposals, and bargaining; in December 1956, HM Treasury authorised work on both the Rotodyne and Eland engine to be continued until the end of September 1957. Amongst the demands exerted by the Treasury were that the aircraft had to be both a technical success and would need to acquire a firm order from BEA; both Fairey and English Electric (Napier's parent company) also had to take on a portion of the costs for its development as well.

=== Testing and evaluation ===
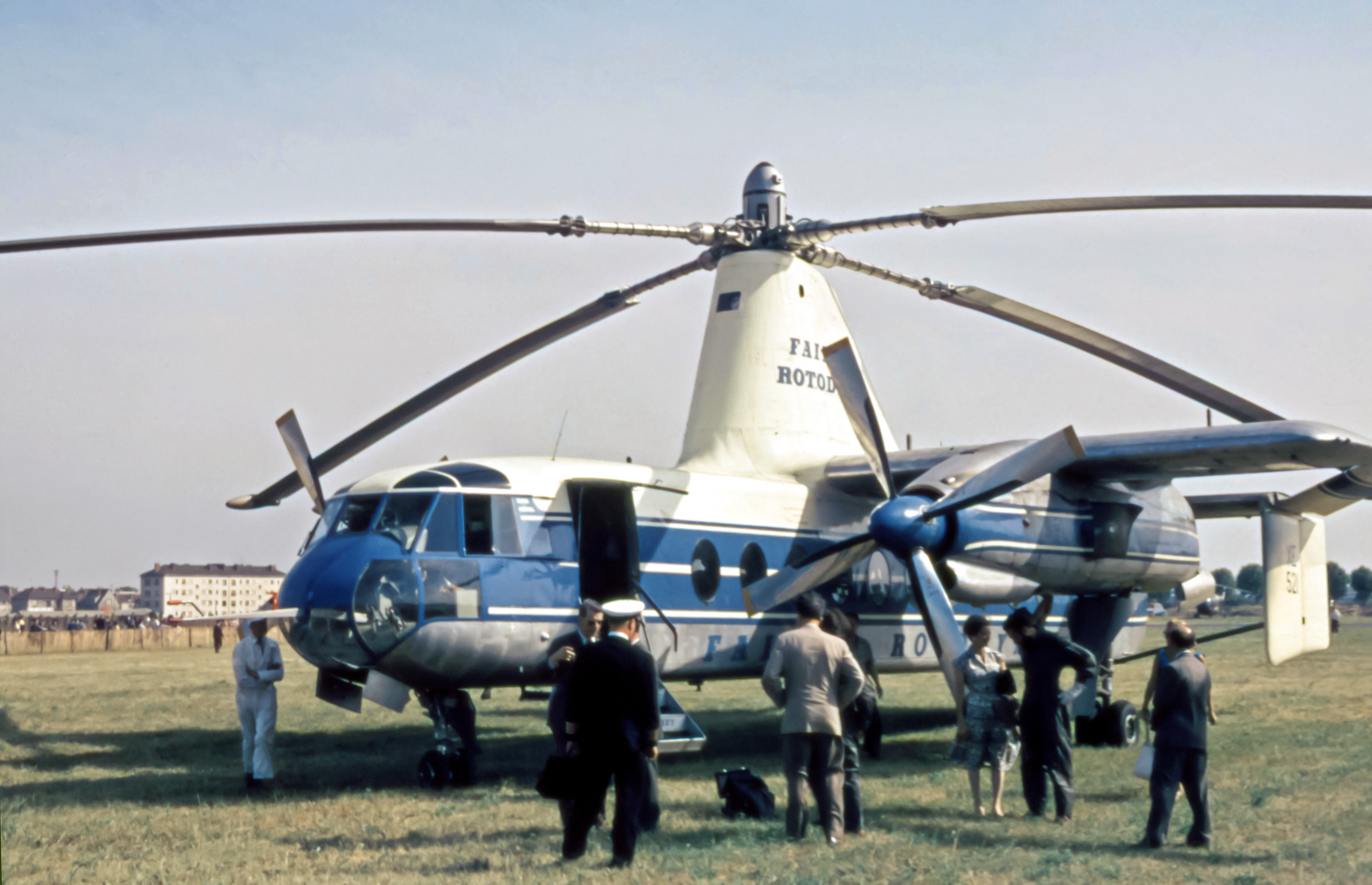
The Fairey Rotodyne prototype circa 1959

On 6 November 1957, the prototype performed its maiden flight, piloted by chief helicopter test pilot Squadron Leader W. Ron Gellatly and assistant chief helicopter test pilot Lieutenant Commander John G.P. Morton as second pilot. The first flight had originally been projected to take place in 1956; however, delay was viewed as inevitable with an entirely new concept such as used by the Rotodyne.

On 10 April 1958, the Rotodyne achieved its first successful transition from vertical to horizontal and then back into vertical flight. On 5 January 1959, the Rotodyne set a world speed record in the convertiplane category, at 190.9 mph (307.2 km/h), over a 60-mile (97 km) closed circuit. As well as being fast, the rotorcraft had a safety feature: it could hover with one engine shut down with its propeller feathered, and the prototype demonstrated several landings as an autogyro. The prototype was demonstrated several times at the Farnborough and Paris air shows, regularly amazing onlookers. In one instance, it even lifted a 100 ft girder bridge.

External image
- Rotodyne lifting a bridge

The Rotodyne's tip drive and unloaded rotor made its performance far better when compared to pure helicopters and other forms of "convertiplanes." The aircraft could be flown at 175 kn (324 km/h) and pulled into a steep climbing turn without demonstrating any adverse handling characteristics.

Throughout the world, interest was growing in the prospect of direct city-to-city transport. The market for the Rotodyne was that of a medium-haul "flying bus": It would take off vertically from an inner-city heliport, with all lift coming from the tip-jet driven rotor, and then would increase airspeed, eventually with all power from the engines being transferred to the propellers with the rotor autorotating. In this mode, the collective pitch, and hence drag, of the rotor could be reduced, as the wings would be taking as much as half of the craft's weight. The Rotodyne would then cruise at speeds of about 150 kn (280 km/h) to another city, e.g., London to Paris, where the rotor tip-jet system would be restarted for landing vertically in the city centre. When the Rotodyne landed and the rotor stopped moving, its blades drooped downward from the hub. To avoid striking the vertical stabilisers on startup, the tips of these fins were angled down to the horizontal. They were raised once the rotor had spun up.

By January 1959, British European Airways (BEA) announced that it was interested in the purchase of six aircraft, with a possibility of up to 20, and had issued a letter of intent stating such, on the condition that all requirements, including noise levels, were met. The Royal Air Force (RAF) had also placed an order for 12 military transport versions. New York Airways signed a letter of intent for the purchase of five at $2m each, with an option of 15 more albeit with qualifications, after calculating that a larger Rotodyne could operate at half the seat mile cost of helicopters; however, unit costs were deemed too high for very short hauls of 10 to 50 miles, and the Civil Aeronautics Board was opposed to rotorcraft competing with fixed-wing on longer routes. Japan Air Lines, which had sent a team to Britain to evaluate the Rotodyne prototype, stated it would experiment with Rotodyne between Tokyo Airport and the city itself, and was interested in using it on the Tokyo-Osaka route as well.

According to rumours, the U.S. Army was also interested in buying around 200 Rotodynes. Fairey was keen to secure funding from the American Mutual Aid programme, but could not persuade the RAF to order the minimum necessary 25 rotorcraft needed; at one point, the firm even considered providing a single Rotodyne to Eastern Airlines via Kaman Helicopters, Fairey's U.S. licensee, so that it could be hired out to the U.S. Army for trials. All Rotodynes destined for US customers were to have been manufactured by Kaman in Bloomfield, Connecticut.

Financing from the government had been secured again on the proviso that firm orders would be gained from BEA. The civilian orders were dependent on the noise issues being satisfactorily met; the importance of this factor had led to Fairey developing 40 different noise suppressors by 1955. In December 1955, Dr Hislop said he was certain that the noise issue could be 'eliminated'. According to Wood, the two most serious problems revealed with the Rotodyne during flight testing was the noise issue and the weight of the rotor system, the latter being 2,233 lb (1,013 kg) above the original projection of 3,270 lb (1,480 kg).

=== Issues and cancellation ===
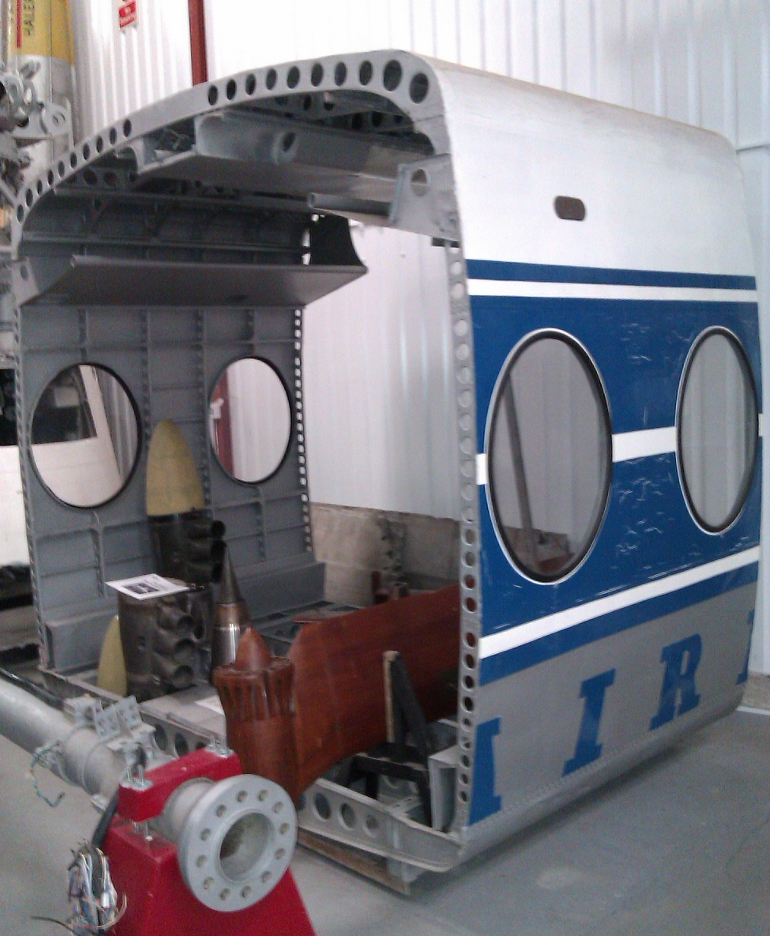
One of the few surviving parts of the dismantled prototype, The Helicopter Museum, Weston-Super-Mare

In 1959, the British government, seeking to cut costs, decreed that the number of aircraft firms should be lowered and set forth its expectations for mergers in airframe and aero-engine companies. By delaying or withholding access to defence contracts, the British firms could be forced into mergers; Duncan Sandys, Minister of Aviation, expressed this policy to Fairey and made it known that the price of continued government backing for the Rotodyne would be for Fairey to virtually withdraw from all other initiatives in the aviation field. Ultimately, Saunders-Roe and the helicopter division of Bristol were incorporated with Westland; in May 1960, Fairey Aviation was also taken over by Westland. By this time, the Rotodyne had flown almost 1,000 people for 120 hours in 350 flights and conducted a total of 230 transitions between helicopter and autogiro — with no accidents.

By 1958, the Treasury was already expressing its opposition to further financing for the programme. The matter was escalated to the Prime Minister, Harold Macmillan, who wrote to Aubrey Jones, the Minister of Supply, on 6 June 1958, stating that "this project must not be allowed to die". Considerable importance was placed upon BEA supporting the Rotodyne by issuing an order; however, the airline refused to procure the aircraft until it was satisfied that guarantees were given over its performance, economy, and noise criteria. Shortly after Fairey's merger with Westland, the latter was issued a £4 million development contract for the Rotodyne, which was intended to see the type enter service with BEA as a result.

As flight testing with the Rotodyne prototype had proceeded, Fairey had become increasingly dissatisfied with Napier and the Eland engine as progress to improve the latter had been less than expected. For the extended 48-seat model of the Rotodyne to be achieved, the uprated 3,500 ehp Eland N.E1.7 would be necessary; of the estimated £7 million needed to produce the larger aircraft, £3 million would be for its engines. BEA was particularly supportive of a larger aircraft, potentially seating as many as 66 passengers, which would have required a still-far greater sum of money to achieve. Fairey was already struggling to achieve the stated performance of the Eland engine and had resorted to adopting a richer fuel mixture to get the necessary power, a side effect of which was to further aggravate the noticeable noise issue as well as reducing fuel efficiency. As a result of being unable to resolve the issues with the Eland, Fairey opted to adopt the rival Rolls-Royce Tyne turboprop engine to power the larger Rotodyne Z instead.

The larger Rotodyne Z design could be developed to take 57 to 75 passengers and, when equipped with the Tyne engines (5,250 shp/3,910 kW), would have a projected cruising speed of 200 kn (370 km/h). It would be able to carry nearly 8 tons (7 tonnes) of freight; cargoes could have included some British Army vehicles and even the intact fuselage of some fighter aircraft that would fit into its fuselage. It would have also been able to carry large cargoes externally as an aerial crane, including vehicles and whole aircraft. According to some of the later proposals, the Rotodyne Z would have had a gross weight of 58,500 lb (26,500 kg), an extended rotor diameter of 109 ft (33 m), and a tapered wing with a span of 75 ft (23 m).

However, the Tyne engines were also starting to appear under-powered for the larger design. The Ministry of Supply had pledged to finance 50 per cent of the development costs for both the Rotodyne Z and for the model of the Tyne engine to power it. Despite the strenuous efforts of Fairey to achieve its support, the expected order from the RAF did not materialise — at the time, the service had no particular interest in the design, being more focused on effectively addressing the issue of nuclear deterrence. As the trials continued, both the associated costs and the weight of the Rotodyne continued to climb; the noise issue continued to persist, although, according to Wood: "there were signs that silencers would later reduce it to an acceptable level".

While the costs of development were shared half-and-half between Westland and the government, the firm determined that it would still need to contribute a further £9 million in order to complete development and achieve production-ready status. Following the issuing of a requested quotation to the British government for 18 production Rotodynes, 12 for the RAF and 6 for BEA, the government responded that no further support would be issued for the project, for economic reasons. Accordingly, on 26 February 1962, official funding for the Rotodyne was terminated in early 1962. The project's final end came when BEA chose to decline placing its own order for the Rotodyne, principally because of its concerns regarding the high-profile tip-jet noise issue. The corporate management at Westland determined that further development of the Rotodyne towards production status would not be worth the investment required. Thus ended all work on the world's first vertical take-off military/civil transport rotorcraft.

After the programme was terminated, the prototype Rotodyne itself, which was government property, was dismantled and largely destroyed in a fashion reminiscent of the Bristol Brabazon. A single fuselage bay, as pictured, plus rotors and rotorhead mast survived, and are on display at The Helicopter Museum, Weston-super-Mare.

=== Analysis ===
The one great criticism of the Rotodyne was the noise the tip jets made; however, the jets were only run at full power for a matter of minutes during departure and landing and, indeed, the test pilot Ron Gellatly made two flights over central London and several landings and departures at Battersea Heliport with no complaints being registered, though John Farley, chief test pilot of the Hawker Siddeley Harrier later commented:

From two miles away it would stop a conversation. I mean, the noise of those little jets on the tips of the rotor was just indescribable. So what have we got? The noisiest hovering vehicle the world has yet come up with and you're going to stick it in the middle of a city?

—

There had been a noise-reduction programme in process which had managed to reduce the noise level from 113 dB to the desired level of 96 dB from 600 ft (180 m) away, less than the noise made by a London Underground train, and at the time of cancellation, silencers were under development, which would have reduced the noise even further — with 95 dB at 200 ft "foreseen", the limitation being the noise created by the rotor itself. This effort, however, was insufficient for BEA which, as expressed by Chairman Sholto Douglas, "would not purchase an aircraft that could not be operated due to noise", and the airline refused to order the Rotodyne, which in turn led to the collapse of the project.

It is only relatively recently that interest has been reestablished in direct city-to-city helicopter transport, with aircraft such as the AgustaWestland AW609 and the CarterCopter/PAV. The 2010 Eurocopter X3 experimental helicopter shares the general configuration of the Rotodyne, but is much smaller. A number of innovative gyrodyne designs are still being considered for future development.

== Design ==
The Fairey Rotodyne was a large hybrid rotorcraft termed compound gyroplane. According to Wood, it was "the largest transport helicopter of its day". It featured an unobstructed rectangular fuselage, capable of seating between 40 and 50 passengers; a pair of double-clamshell doors were placed to the rear of the main cabin so that freight and even vehicles could be loaded and unloaded.

The Rotodyne had a large, four-bladed rotor and two Napier Eland N.E.L.3 turboprops, one mounted under each of the fixed wings. The rotor blades were a symmetrical aerofoil around a load-bearing spar. The aerofoil was made of steel and light alloy because of centre of gravity concerns. Equally, the spar was formed from a thick machined steel block to the fore and a lighter thinner section formed from folded and riveted steel to the rear. The compressed air was channelled through three steel tubes within the blade. The tip-jet combustion chambers were composed of Nimonic 80, complete with liners that were made from Nimonic 75.

For takeoff and landing, the rotor was driven by tip-jets. The air was produced by compressors driven through a clutch off the main engines. This was fed through ducting in the leading edge of the wings and up to the rotor head. Each engine supplied air for a pair of opposite rotors; the compressed air was mixed with fuel and burned. As a torqueless rotor system, no anti-torque correction system was required, though propeller pitch was controlled by the rudder pedals for low-speed yaw control. The propellers provided thrust for translational flight while the rotor autorotated. The cockpit controls included a cyclic and collective pitch lever, as in a conventional helicopter.

The transition between helicopter and autogyro modes of flight would have taken place around 60 mph (50 kn; 95 km/h), (other sources state that this would have occurred around 110 kn or 200 km/h); the transition would have been accomplished by extinguishing the tip-jets. During autogyro flight, up to half of the rotocraft's aerodynamic lift was provided by the wings, which also enabled it to attain higher speed.

== Specifications (Rotodyne "Y") ==
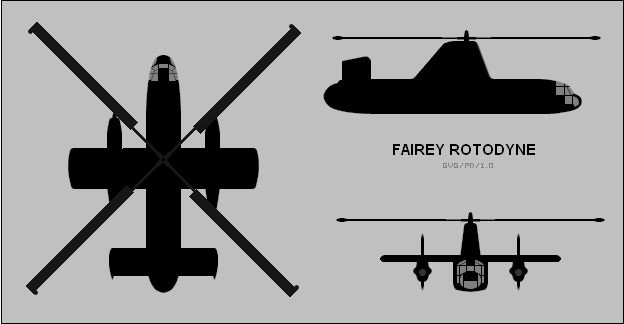
Fairey Rotodyne 3-view

External image
- Cutaway drawing of Rotodyne from Flightglobal.com (Archive)

Data from Fairey Aircraft since 1915,Goebel 2015, Gibbings 2011, Jane's All the World's Aircraft 1958-59.

General characteristics

- Crew: two
- Capacity: 40–48 passengers
- Length: 58 ft 8 in (17.88 m) of fuselage
- Wingspan: 46 ft 6 in (14.17 m) fixed wings
- Height: 22 ft 2 in (6.76 m) to top of rotor pylon
- Wing area: 475 sq ft (44.1 m^{2})
- Airfoil: NACA 23015
- Empty weight: 22,000 lb (9,979 kg)
- Gross weight: 33,000 lb (14,969 kg)
- Fuel capacity: 7,500 lb (3,402 kg)
- Powerplant: 2 × Napier Eland N.El.7 turboprops, 2,800 shp (2,100 kW) each
- Powerplant: 4 × rotor tip jet , 1,000 lbf (4.4 kN) thrust each
- Main rotor diameter: 90 ft 0 in (27.43 m)
- Main rotor area: 6,362 sq ft (591.0 m^{2}) Rotor aerofoil: NACA 0015
- Blade tip speed: 720 ft/s (220 m/s)
- Disc loading: 6.14 lb/ft^{2} (30 kg/m^{2})
- Propellers: 4-bladed, 13 ft (4.0 m) diameter Rotol propellers

Performance

- Maximum speed: 190.9 mph (307.2 km/h, 165.9 kn) speed record
- Cruise speed: 185 mph (298 km/h, 161 kn)
- Range: 450 mi (720 km, 390 nmi)
- Service ceiling: 13,000 ft (4,000 m)

== See also ==
- Gyrodyne

Related development

- Fairey FB-1 Gyrodyne
- Fairey Jet Gyrodyne
- Fairey Ultra-light Helicopter

Aircraft of comparable role, configuration, and era

- McDonnell XV-1
- Mil Mi-12
- Kamov Ka-22
- Hiller Hornet
- Eurocopter X3

Related lists

- List of rotorcraft
- List of VTOL aircraft

== Bibliography ==
- Charnov, Dr. Bruce H. "The Fairey Rotodyne: An Idea Whose Time Has Come – Again?" gyropilot.co.uk. Retrieved: 18 May 2007.
- Charnov, Dr. Bruce H. From Autogiro to Gyroplane: The Amazing Survival of an Aviation Technology. Westport, Connecticut: Praeger Publishers, 2003. ISBN 978-1-56720-503-9.
- Gibbings, David. Fairey Rotodyne. Stroud, Gloucestershire, UK: The History Press, 2009. ISBN 978-0-7524-4916-6.
- Gibbings, David. "The Fairey Rotodyne-Technology Before its Time?: The 2003 Cierva Lecture." The Aeronautical Journal (The Royal Aeronautical Society), Vol. 108, No 1089, November 2004. (Presented by David Gibbings and subsequently published in The Aeronautical Journal.)
- Green, William and Gerald Pollinger. The Observer's Book of Aircraft, 1958 edition. London: Fredrick Warne & Co. Ltd., 1958.
- Hayward, Keith (April 2018). "A Very Large and Awkward Baby...: Whitehall & the Fairey Rotodyne". The Aviation Historian (23): 38–49. ISSN 2051-1930.
- Hislop, Dr. G.S. "The Fairey Rotodyne." A Paper presented to The Helicopter Society of Great Britain and the RAeS, November 1958.
- "Requiem for the Rotodyne." Flight International, 9 August 1962, pp. 200–202.
- "Rotodyne, Fairey's Big Convertiplane Nears Completion: A Detailed Description." Flight, 9 August 1957, pp. 191–197.
- Taylor, H.A. Fairey Aircraft since 1915. London: Putnam, 1974. ISBN 978-0-370-00065-7.
- Taylor, John W. R. Jane's All The World's Aircraft 1961–62. London: Sampson Low, Marston & Company, 1961.
- Taylor, John W.R. Jane's Pocket Book of Research and Experimental Aircraft. London: Macdonald and Jane's Publishers Ltd, 1976. ISBN 978-0-356-08409-1.
- Winchester, Jim, ed. "Fairey Rotodyne." Concept Aircraft (The Aviation Factfile). Rochester, Kent, UK: Grange Books plc, 2005. ISBN 978-1-84013-809-2.
- Wood, Derek. Project Cancelled. Macdonald and Jane's Publishers, 1975. ISBN 0-356-08109-5.
