= FF Groen =

Dutch shipyard owner (1814–1882)

- Born: Frédéric François Groen van Waarder; December 20, 1814
- Died: March 10, 1882 (aged 67)
- Occupations: Shipyard owner, shipbuilder
- Children: Herman Frédéric Groen van Waarder (1846-1904)

FF Groen announces his retirement

Frédéric François Groen, heer van Waarder (1814–1882) was a Dutch shipyard operator in Amsterdam. The shipyard was called FF Groen Scheepsbouwwerft de boot and was located at 111 Gr Wittenburgerstraat. Groen's son, Herman Frederik (1846-1904), built at least two full-rigged sailing ships, the Vondel (1894) and Nicolaas Witsen (1897), but neither was sold. So he operated the ships himself. In 1897 he retired, HF Groen was not married and had no children and died on 1-10-1904. His great collection of paintings and prints concerning ships were sold in 1905 as well as both ships were sold to the Hamburg shipping company Eugen Cellier.

FF Groen and his family have a grave monument in Muiderberg.
