= Fairey Jet Gyrodyne =

British compound gyroplane

Jet Gyrodyne
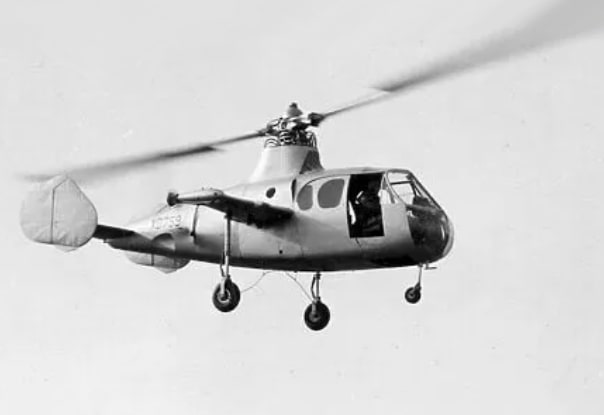

General information
- Type: Experimental gyrodyne
- National origin: United Kingdom
- Manufacturer: Fairey Aviation
- Status: Retired
- Number built: 1

History
- First flight: January 1954 (free flight); 1 March 1955 (transition flight)
- Retired: 1961
- Developed from: Fairey FB-1 Gyrodyne
- Variant: Fairey Rotodyne

The Fairey Jet Gyrodyne is a British experimental compound gyroplane built by the Fairey Aviation Company that incorporated helicopter, gyrodyne and autogyro characteristics. The Jet Gyrodyne was the subject of a Ministry of Supply (MoS) research contract to gather data for the follow-up design, the Rotodyne.

== Design and development ==
The Jet Gyrodyne was a modification of the second prototype FB-1 Gyrodyne aircraft registered G-AJJP. The Jet Gyrodyne was built specifically to develop the pressure-jet rotor drive system and operational procedures used on the later Rotodyne.

The Jet Gyrodyne utilised the fuselage, undercarriage and engine of the FB-1 Gyrodyne. The Alvis Leonides nine-cylinder radial engine was situated in the middle of the fuselage and drove a pusher propeller at the tip of each stub wing and two Rolls-Royce Merlin engine superchargers. The original three-blade tilting hub rotor system was replaced by a two-blade rotor controlled with swashplate-actuated cyclic and collective pitch controls. An empennage provided the necessary stabilization about the pitch and yaw axes.

For takeoff, landing, and low-speed flight, the rotor was driven by air delivered by the superchargers and burnt with fuel in blade-tip mounted pressure-jets. This zero-torque rotor drive did not require a compensating anti-torque system, though the collective pitch of the wingtip-mounted propellers was controlled by the rudder pedals to provide yaw control. As airspeed was gained, the rotor drive system was shut down, allowing the rotor to autorotate while the propellers provided the necessary thrust. For low-speed flight and landing, the rotor drive system was restarted to provide hovering capability.

== Operational history ==
Instrument panel

Tethered flights at White Waltham were followed by the first free flight in January 1954, but a full transition from helicopter to autogyro flight was not achieved until March 1955, piloted by John N. Dennis. System proving continued and by September 1956, 190 transitions and 140 autorotative landings had been completed. Development of inflight rotor drive restart procedure resulted in several power-off autorotational landings until the method was perfected. The Jet Gyrodyne was underpowered and could carry sufficient fuel for only 15 minutes of flight; on occasion external fuel tanks were carried to increase endurance.

The Jet Gyrodyne was retired once ground testing of the Rotodyne rotor drive system commenced.

== Aircraft on display ==
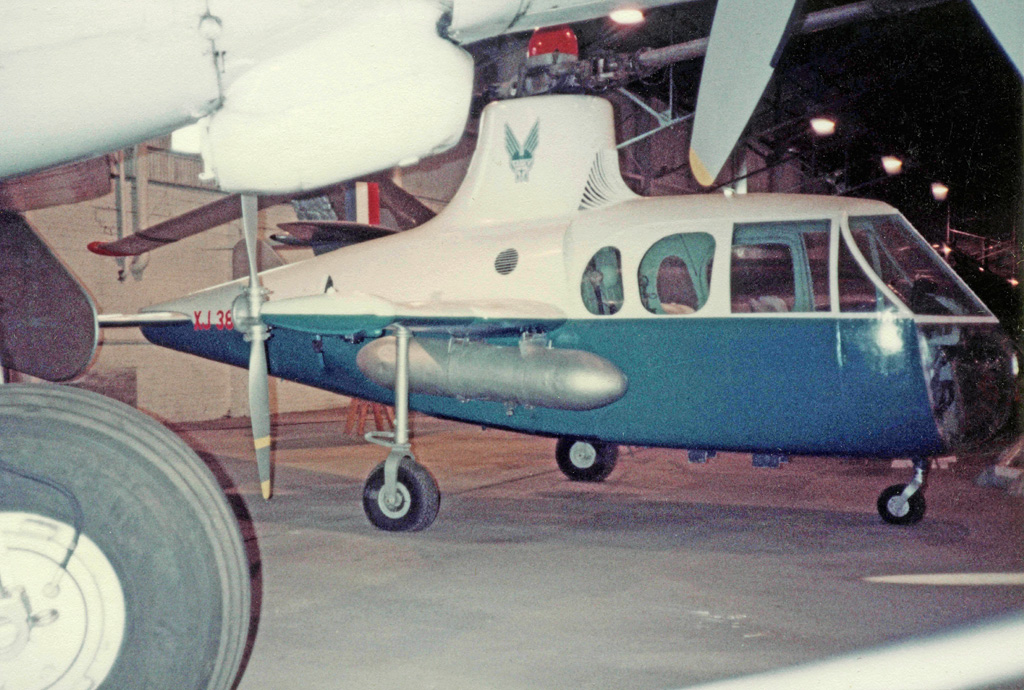
The Fairey Jet Gyrodyne preserved at the RAF Museum at RAF Cosford in 1981

Although scheduled for scrapping in 1961, the Jet Gyrodyne (serial number XD759 later XJ389) survived and today is displayed at the Museum of Berkshire Aviation, on loan from the RAF Museum collection.

== Specifications (Jet Gyrodyne) ==
Data from British Aircraft Director

General characteristics

- Crew: 2
- Length: 25 ft (7.6 m)
- Height: 10 ft 2 in (3.10 m)
- Empty weight: 3,600 lb (1,633 kg)
- Gross weight: 4,800 lb (2,177 kg)
- Powerplant: 1 × Alvis Leonides 9-cylinder air-cooled radial piston engine, 520 hp (390 kW)
- Powerplant: 2 × Fairey fuel burning compressed air tip-jets
- Main rotor diameter: 51 ft 9 in (15.77 m)
- Main rotor area: 2,103.6 sq ft (195.43 m^{2})
- Propellers: 3 (but see picture = 2 bladed ?)-bladed variable-pitch propeller (2 of)

Performance

- Maximum speed: 140 mph (230 km/h, 120 kn)

== See also ==
Related development

- Fairey FB-1 Gyrodyne

Aircraft of comparable role, configuration, and era

- McDonnell XV-1

Related lists

- List of rotorcraft
