= Gyrodyne GCA-2 =

The Gyrodyne GCA-2 was a general-purpose helicopter built by the Gyrodyne Company of America in the late 1940s.

== Development ==
In 1946 the newly formed Gyrodyne Company acquired rights to the Bendix Model J and developed it into the GCA-2 (N74101). The GCA-2 was of all-metal construction, and had a coaxial twin rotor layout, with a five-seat cabin and a rounded fuselage with twin fins. Later on, the GCA-2 was designated GCA-2A Helidyne after being modified with twin 100 hp Continental auxiliary engines mounted externally on strutted outriggers to give additional forward speed, flying on November 30, 1949. A second GCA-2 airframe, the GCA-2C (civil registration N6594K), first flew on April 25, 1952, piloted by Jim Ryan; it could also be used as an ambulance helicopter capable of carrying three litters.

== Specifications (GCA-2C) ==
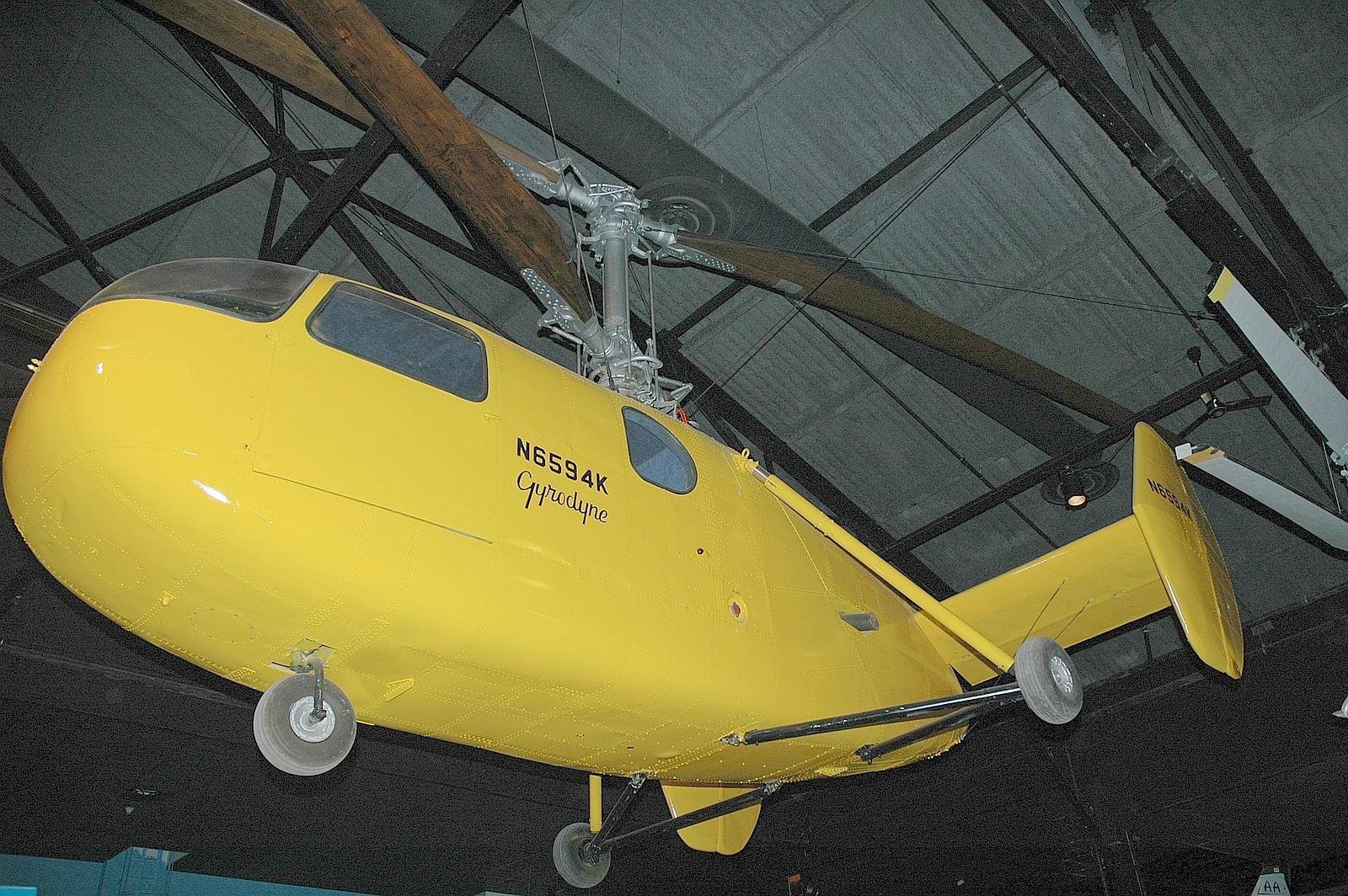
Gyrodyne GCA-2C N6594K on display at the Cradle of Aviation Museum, Garden City, New York

Data from Jane's All the World's Aircraft 1952–53

General characteristics

- Crew: 1
- Capacity: 5 passengers
- Height: 14 ft 4 in (4.37 m)
- Empty weight: 3,600 lb (1,633 kg)
- Gross weight: 5,400 lb (2,449 kg)
- Powerplant: 1 × Pratt & Whitney R-985-B4 Wasp Junior
- Main rotor diameter: 2 × 48 ft (15 m)
- Main rotor area: 3,619 sq ft (336.2 m^{2})

Performance

- Maximum speed: 110 mph (180 km/h, 96 kn)
- Cruise speed: 89 mph (143 km/h, 77 kn)
- Combat range: 270 mi (430 km, 230 nmi)
- Service ceiling: 7,000 ft (2,100 m) (vertical flight)
- Rate of climb: 1,460 ft/min (7.4 m/s)
