= Gyrodyne Company of America =

American real estate investment trust

- Traded as: Nasdaq: GYRO
- Founded: 1946
- Founder: Peter J. Papadakos
- Key people: Frederick C. Braun III; President and CEO

Gyrodyne Company of America, Inc. is a real estate investment trust that owns, leases, and manages commercial properties along the Eastern Coast of the United States.

Gyrodyne's headquarters are located in Saint James, New York, in Eastern Long Island. It was founded in 1946, initially as a helicopter design and manufacturing company.

== History ==
Gyrodyne Company of America was founded in 1946 by Peter J. Papadakos, using the assets he bought from the bankrupt Bendix Helicopters Company. The company continued Bendix's development of a one-man synchronized co-axial rotor helicopter in Massapequa, New York, before moving to St. James, New York, in 1951. For the next 24 years the company was engaged in the design, testing, development, and production of coaxial helicopters, primarily the Gyrodyne QH-50 DASH drone for the U.S. Navy. In 1975, Gyrodyne began converting its helicopter manufacturing facilities into rental space suitable for light industry. Since then the company has concentrated its efforts on the management and development of real estate.

On November 2, 2005, Stony Brook University seized 245.5 acres under eminent domain from Gyrodyne, initially paying them $26,315,000 for the property. In 2006, Gyrodyne opened a case for just compensation. Finally, in 2010, the Court of Claims ruled in Gyrodyne's favor when it awarded the company $125,000,000 thereby requiring the state to pay an additional $98,685,000 plus interest of nine percent from the date of taking, to the date of payment.

In 2006, Gyrodyne became a publicly traded Real Estate Investment Trust. Around this time, Gyrodyne began focusing on purchasing medical properties. Since then, the company has bought three such facilities: two in New York, and one in Northern Virginia.

== Aircraft ==
- Gyrodyne QH-50 DASH
- Gyrodyne RON Rotorcycle
- Gyrodyne GCA-2
- Gyrodyne GCA-3 Convertiplane
- Gyrodyne GCA-35 Gyroliner
- Gyrodyne GCA-24
- Gyrodyne GCA-32 Military Convertiplane
- Gyrodyne GCA-55

== Properties ==
Today Gyrodyne owns, manages, and leases four properties: two in eastern Long Island, one in southern New York, and one in Northern Virginia. In addition, the company has a limited partnership investment in a citrus grove called the Callery-Judge Grove, located in Palm Beach County, Florida.

Flowerfield is the location of Gyrodyne's headquarters and is the former site of the helicopter manufacturing facility. It is located in Saint James, New York, 50 miles east of New York City. Flowerfield is a 68-acre property with 127,062 square feet of rentable space zoned primarily for light industry. Initially more than 300 acres, most of the Flowerfield property was taken by Stony Brook University under eminent domain in 2005.

In June 2007 the company acquired ten buildings in the Port Jefferson Professional Park in Port Jefferson Station, New York. These buildings are situated on 5.16 acres with 39,329 square feet of rentable space.

Cortlandt Medical Center in Cortlandt Manor, New York, was acquired by the company on June 2, 2008. It contains five office buildings which are situated on 5.01 acres with 31,198 rentable square feet. The company also acquired land around this site, including a 16,000 square foot house located on 1.43 acres, and 2,500 rentable square feet on 1.6 acres.

Fairfax Medical Center was acquired on March 31, 2009. It consists of two office buildings situated on 3.5 acres with 57,621 square feet of rentable space.
