= Groen ShadowHawk =

Cancelled American gyroplane

ShadowHawk

General information
- Type: Autogyro
- National origin: United States
- Manufacturer: Groen Aeronautics
- Status: Development ended (after 2015)
- Number built: none

The Groen ShadowHawk was a proposed American autogyro that was under development in the mid-2010s by Groen Aeronautics of Midvale, Utah for the surveillance role. The aircraft was intended to be supplied complete and ready-to-fly.

Active in 2015, by November 2017 the project's webpage had been taken down and development has probably ended.

== Design and development ==
The ShadowHawk was based upon the earlier Groen Hawk 4 and its successful employment in the surveillance role at the 2002 Winter Olympics in Salt Lake City.

The design was to feature a single main rotor, a two-seats-in side-by-side configuration enclosed cockpit with a bubble canopy, tricycle landing gear, plus dual tail casters and pusher configuration engine. The design includes a two-bladed rotor and a four-bladed pusher propeller.

== Specifications (ShadowHawk) ==
Data from Tacke

General characteristics

- Crew: one
- Capacity: one passenger
- Empty weight: 928 lb (421 kg)
- Gross weight: 2,000 lb (907 kg)
- Powerplant: 1 × aircraft engine
- Propellers: 4-bladed composite

Performance

- Maximum speed: 147 mph (236 km/h, 127 kn)
- Cruise speed: 138 mph (222 km/h, 120 kn)
- Rate of climb: 1,500 ft/min (7.6 m/s)

== See also ==
- List of rotorcraft
