= Skyworks Aeronautics =

American autogyro research and development company

Skyworks Aeronautics Corp.
- Company type: Aircraft manufacturer
- Industry: Aviation
- Founded: 1986
- Founder: David and Jay Groen
- Headquarters: Chicago, Illinois, United States
- Key people: Steve G. Stevanovich (Executive Director); Brig. General John Michel (Executive Director)
- Subsidiaries: American Autogyro
- Website: skyworks-aero.com

GBA Founders: David and Jay Groen with Hawk 1

Skyworks Aeronautics Corp., formerly Groen Brothers Aviation, Inc., Groen Aeronautics Corporation and Skyworks Global, is an American autogyro research and development company based in Chicago. The company was founded in 1986 by David Groen and his late brother Jay Groen in Salt Lake City, Utah. David Groen remains as Senior Advisor.

In 2001, Time magazine listed GBA's Hawk Gyroplane as one of their featured "Inventions of the Year."

== History ==
The original name of Skyworks Aeronautics Corp. was Groen Brothers Aviation. It started out by incorporating helicopter design components into autogyro design. They added helicopter-style collective pitch control which allowed their aircraft to achieve vertical takeoff and landing and to stabilize flight at high and low speeds.

The company holds three U.S. patents and several international patents associated with their variable pitch rotor system. Following the first flight of their proof-of-concept aircraft in 1987, the company flew several larger prototype autogyros during the 1990s.

In September 1999 the company flew their first piston-engine powered prototype of the four-seat Hawk 4. The turbine-engined prototype first flew in July 2000, with a Rolls-Royce 250 420 hp (313 kW) turboprop engine and was the world's first turbine powered gyroplane. The design's rotor blades used a company-developed natural laminar-flow airfoil.

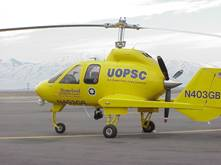
The Hawk 4 provided perimeter patrol during the 2002 Winter Olympics.

In 2002, the company provided the Utah Olympic Public Safety Command (UOPSC) a Hawk 4 prototype for perimeter patrol around the Salt Lake City International Airport during the 2002 Winter Olympics and Paralympics. The Hawk 4 completed 67 missions over 75 hours of flying time during the 90-day contract.

In February, 2003, the company introduced its “Stabilization Augmentation Kit,” designed to improve in-flight stability and safety for kit gyroplanes on the market. The company entered the kit market with the Sparrowhawk. The company discontinued Sparrowhawk kit production, but formed American Autogyro, as a subsidiary to produce and sell Sparrowhawk kits as a separate business.

In November, 2005, the U.S. Defense Advanced Research Projects Agency (DARPA) selected a company-led team to design a proof-of-concept high-speed, long-range, VTOL GBA-DARPA Heliplane designed for combat search and rescue. The project was named the “Heliplane” by DARPA and intended to meet economy and performance goals not achievable by existing aircraft. The company completed work for Phase I of the project in 2009, but the project has not been further funded.

In December 2012, Steve G. Stevanovich led an acquisition of Groen Brothers Aviation by forming a new private company, Groen Aeronautics Corporation, which was registered in Delaware and acquired all the assets of the public Company Groen Brothers Aviation, Inc. This acquisition was accomplished in a transaction equal to more than $210 million. Groen Brothers Aviation Inc. retains a minority share holding in the Groen Aeronautics Corporation. Groen Aeronautics Corporation has since been re-branded as Skyworks Aeronautics Corp.

== Aircraft flight test programs ==
- Hawk Point Five – single seat gyroplane with collective pitch-controlled rotor, open-frame gyroplane. First aircraft built by GBA. (1987)
- Hawk 1 – single seat gyroplane with collective pitch-controlled rotor, retractable landing gear, fully enclosed stressed skin monocoque design.
- H2X – side-by-side two seat version of the Hawk 1 gyroplane.
- Hawk 4 – four seat gyroplane with piston engine, designed to meet FAA type certification. (1999) Eventually incorporated a Rolls-Royce gas turbine engine, named the Hawk 4T. (2000)
- RevCon 6-X – test conversion of a Cessna 337 Skymaster airplane. This aircraft conversion tested the theory of using fixed-wing airplanes as the basic airframes for gyroplanes to reduce cost and shorten development time.
- SparrowHawk – two seat gyroplane with aluminum frame, centerline thrust aircraft, wide-molded fiberglass cabin with adjustable seating. (2003)

== Aircraft design programs ==
- GBA GyroLiner – commuter airliner.
- GBA GyroLifter – heavy-lift gyroplanes and gyrodynes of various sizes up to 160,000 lbs. GVW.
- GBA ArrowHawk – seven seat turboprop gyroplane.
- GBA-DARPA Heliplane – gyrodyne capable of 400 mph, 1,000 nautical mile range, HOGE at 4,000 feet and 95 °F.
- Groen ShadowHawk – tandem two seat gyroplane for aerial observation.
