= Saro P.531 =

Utility helicopter

P.531
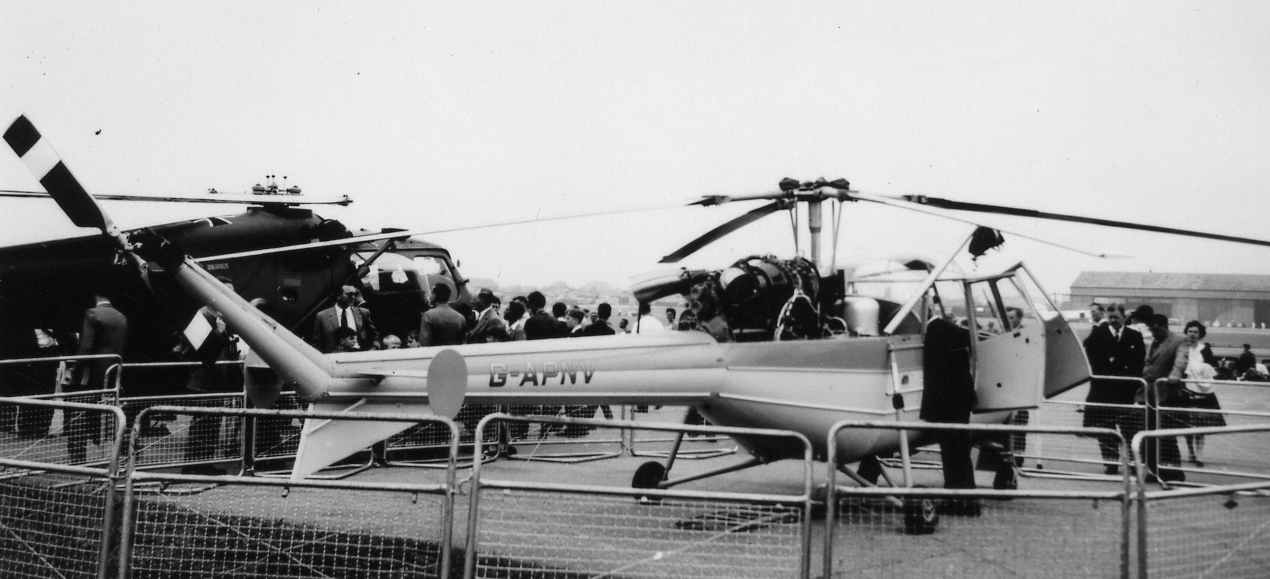
- First P.531-0, G-APNV at the Farnborough show 1958

General information
- Type: Five-seat utility helicopter
- Manufacturer: Saunders-Roe
- Primary user: Fleet Air Arm
- Number built: 6

History
- Introduction date: 1959
- First flight: 20 July 1958
- Variants: Westland Scout; Westland Wasp

The Saro P.531 (or Saunders-Roe P.531) is a British all-metal five-seat helicopter designed and built by Saunders-Roe Limited (Saro). The P.531 was a larger development of the two-seat Saro Skeeter to use turbine power and formed the basis of the military Westland Scout and Westland Wasp helicopters.

== Development ==
Design of the P.531 was started in November 1957 as a private venture improvement of the company's earlier Skeeter. The first prototypes were powered by a derated 325 shp Blackburn Turbomeca Turmo 600, a free turbine engine allowing clutchless transmission. The P.531 first flew on 20 July 1958. Three more developed P.531-0s followed and these were delivered to the Royal Navy's Fleet Air Arm for trials and familiarisation. Following evaluation by the Navy a batch of 30 developed aircraft were eventually ordered as the Westland Wasp.

Two militiarised P.531-2s were completed in 1959, powered by the Blackburn Nimbus and the de Havilland Gnome H1000 free-turbine engines, both derated to 635 shp now that the transmission tests had proved such powers acceptable. Like the Turmo installation, these engines were mounted, uncowled behind the cabin for easy servicing. There were aerodynamic shape revisions and a floor extension to allow six, rather than five seats. The vision was improved with perspex panels in the doors, tankage was increased and all-metal rotors introduced. These modifications increased gross weight by 1,200 lb (544 kg).

Saro had an order for eight pre-production aircraft from the British Army′s Army Air Corps for evaluation and trials; these would have been known as the Saro Sprite, but the company was taken over by Westland Helicopters and the aircraft became the first Westland Scout A.H.1s.

Another P.531-2 was built for evaluation by the Indian government but following a lack of interest was re-worked as Scout standard for the Army Air Corps.

== Variants ==
P.531
Prototype powered by the Turmo 600, one built as G-APNU. Had a short tailplane for c.g. adjustment, though not always installed.
P.531-0
Three further prototypes with full scale tailplane, Turmo powered. G-APNV (later XN322), XN323 and XN324. All three were used by the Navy, with many deck landings; these flights fed into the later development of the Westland Wasp.
P.531-2
Militarised version for both Army and Navy use. G-APVL (later XP116), powered by a slightly derated - to 635 shp (474 kW) - Blackburn Nimbus free-turbine engine. and G-APVM (later XR493) initially powered by a de Havilland Gnome H.1000, derated to 635 shp. It was later developed as the forerunner of the Westland Scout.

== Operators ==
United Kingdom

- Army Air Corps
- Fleet Air Arm

== Aircraft on display ==
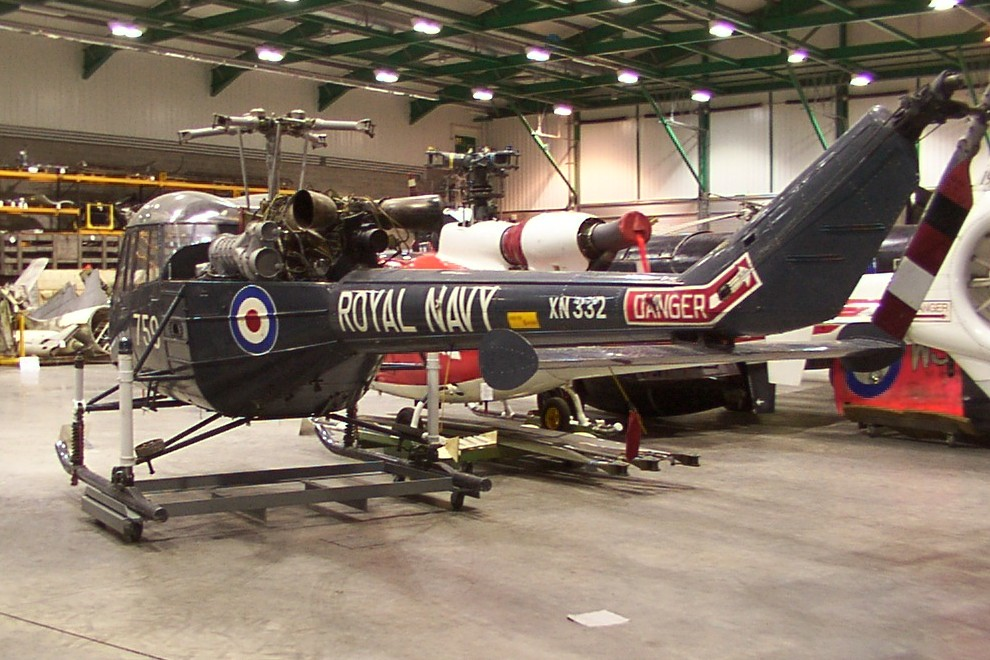
First P.531-0 prototype, XN332 ex-G-APNV in storage at RNAS Yeovilton in 2005

The second and third prototypes are held by the Fleet Air Arm Museum for display whilst one of the P.531-2's is on display at the Helicopter Museum, Weston-super-Mare.

== Specifications (P.531, G-APNU) ==
Data from

General characteristics

- Crew: 2
- Capacity: 3
- Length: 29 ft 0 in (8.84 m) rotors folded
- Height: 9 ft 6 in (2.90 m)
- Empty weight: 2,092 lb (949 kg)
- Gross weight: 3,800 lb (1,724 kg) at maximum overload
- Powerplant: 1 × Blackburn-Turbomeca Turmo turboshaft , derated to 325 hp (242 kW)
- Main rotor diameter: 32 ft 6 in (9.91 m)

Performance

- Maximum speed: 121 mph (194 km/h, 105 kn)
- Cruise speed: 108 mph (175 km/h, 94 kn)
- Range: 242 mi (390 km, 210 nmi)
- Service ceiling: 2,300 ft (700 m) free hover
- Rate of climb: 540 ft/min (2.74 m/s) initially

== See also ==
Related development

- Saro Skeeter
- Westland Scout
- Westland Wasp

Related lists

- list of aircraft of the Fleet Air Arm
