= Historic Army Aircraft Flight =

- Active: 1980; 45 years ago (as Army Historic Aircraft Flight)–present
- Country: United Kingdom
- Branch: British Army (originally)
- Type: Historic flying display unit
- Role: Memorial
- Size: 7 aircraft
- Location: Army Aviation Centre, Middle Wallop, Stockbridge, Hampshire, England, SO20 8DY
- Nickname(s): HAAF
- Motto(s): Let their glory not fade
- Aircraft: See list
- Website: HAAF.uk

The Historic Army Aircraft Flight (HAAF) is a charitable trust which preserves and maintains former British Army Air Corps (AAC) aircraft in flying condition. It thus brings the history of British Army flying to life. It serves as a 'living museum' for ex-service personnel commemorative and memorial purposes, as an aid to recruiting, and for supporting wider British Army heritage in public. It features an aerial display group; comprising a de Havilland Beaver, a Westland Scout, an Agusta-Bell Sioux, and an Auster AOP.9.

== History ==
Initially formed in 1980; 45 years ago, as the Historic Aircraft Flight (HAF) of the AAC, then since March 1990; 35 years ago, as the Army Historic Aircraft Flight (AHAF), it was an official flight of the British Army. It was created in order to save and maintain one example of each aircraft operated since the Army Air Corps inception in 1957. Its purpose was to preserve the AAC's aviation heritage for future generations.

The aircraft of the AHAF were originally supported in part by the Ministry of Defence (MoD), along with additional donations and any income from air displays it undertook. Although the AHAF was self-administered by its own charitable company, in 2013, the MoD withdrew all official public funding. This forced the AHAF into a state of dormancy or 'suspended animation'.

In order to ensure that its aircraft remain airworthy and available, four of the AHAF aircraft (Auster, Beaver, Scout, and Sioux) were transferred to the Civil Register of the UK Civil Aviation Authority (UK CAA); this helps to reduce both maintenance servicing times and costs.

Now known as the Historic Army Aircraft Flight (HAAF), it operates as a Registered Charity (charity number: 1024043, as the Historic Aircraft Flight Trust), governed by the Historic Army Aircraft Flight Trustee Limited. The Historic Army Aircraft Flight Trustee Ltd was incorporated on 1 May 2015; 10 years ago, as a private company limited by guarantee without share capital. Registered in England and Wales under company number 09572211, it is listed under the standard industrial classification of economic activities (SIC) as 'Museums activities' (91020).

== Aircraft ==
The Historic Army Aircraft Flight includes the following retired AAC aircraft:

Historic Army Aircraft Flight (HAAF) aircraft
aircraft manufacturer	aircraft model	aircraft type	military registration	civil registration	ref	Image
flying
de Havilland Canada	Beaver AL.1	fixed-wing single-engine monoplane	XP820	G-CICP		
Auster Aircraft Limited	AOP.9	fixed-wing single-engine monoplane	XR244	G-CICR		
Bell / Westland Aircraft	Sioux AH.1	rotary-wing single-engine helicopter	XT131	G-CICN		
Westland Helicopters	Scout AH.1	rotary-wing single-engine helicopter	XT626	G-CIBW		
De Havilland Canada	Chipmunk T.10	fixed-wing single-engine monoplane	WD325	TBA		
non flying
Saunders-Roe	Skeeter AOP.12	rotary-wing single-engine	XL812	G-SARO		

More details of the aircraft in the Flight can be seen on the website.

== See also ==
- Battle of Britain Memorial Flight (BBMF) — official historic aircraft flight of the Royal Air Force (RAF)
- Royal Navy Historic Flight (RNHF) — former official historic aircraft flight of the Royal Navy (RN)
- Blue Eagles — former official helicopter air display unit of the Army Air Corps (AAC)
- Army Flying Museum — official flying museum of the Army Air Corps (AAC)
- Shuttleworth Collection — at Old Warden near Biggleswade, Bedfordshire, England
- Commemorative Air Force — in Midland, Texas, USA.
