= Westland Scout =

Military utility helicopter

Scout
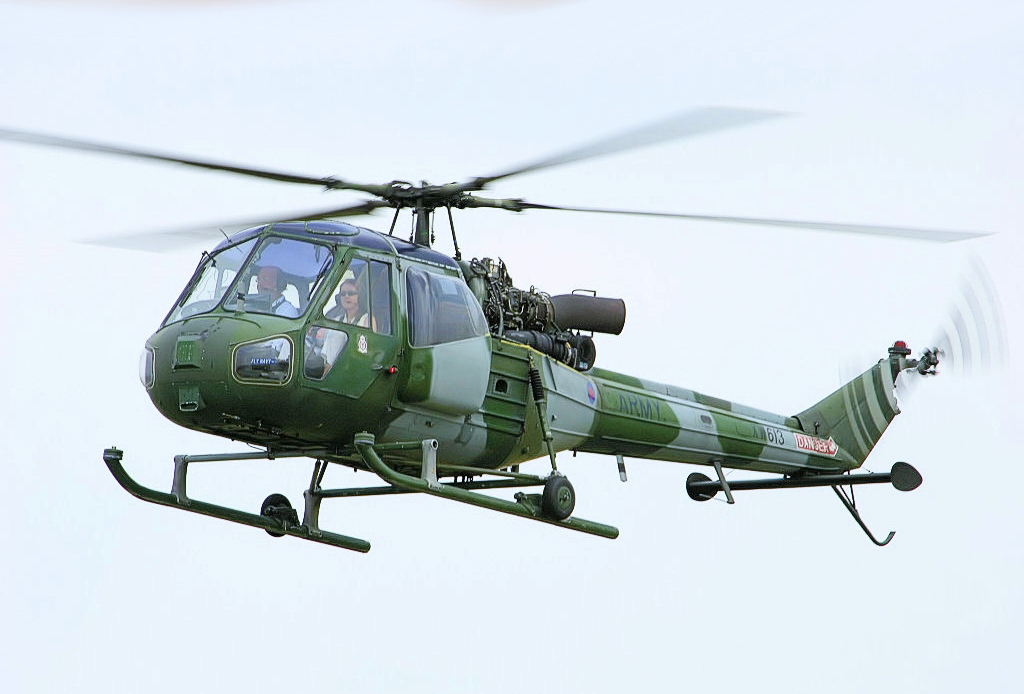
- A Scout flying over RIAT in 2005

General information
- Type: Helicopter
- National origin: United Kingdom
- Manufacturer: Westland Helicopters
- Status: Retired from active service 1994
- Primary users: British Army Royal Australian Navy; Royal Jordanian Air Force; South African Air Force
- Number built: About 150

History
- Manufactured: 1960–1968
- First flight: 29 August 1960
- Developed from: Saro P.531
- Variant: Westland Wasp

The Westland Scout is a light helicopter developed by Westland Helicopters. Developed from the Saro P.531, it served as a land-based general purpose military helicopter, sharing a common ancestor and numerous components with the naval-orientated Westland Wasp helicopter. The type's primary operator was the Army Air Corps of the British Army, which operated it in several conflict zones including Northern Ireland and the Falklands War.

== Development ==
Both the Scout and the Wasp were developed from the Saunders-Roe P.531, itself a development of the Saunders-Roe Skeeter. With the acquisition of Saunders Roe, Westland took over the P.531 project, which became the prototype for the Scout (originally called Sprite) and the Wasp. The initial UK Ministry of Defence (MoD) development contract was for a five to six seat general purpose helicopter.

The first version that met both RN and Army requirement, the P.531-2, flew on 9 August 1959 with a Bristol Siddeley Nimbus engine. A de Havilland Gnome engine-equipped version was also trialled, starting 3 May 1960. The production Scout AH.1 used a Rolls-Royce Nimbus engine (RR having acquired Bristol Siddeley by then). The engine was rated at 1,050 shp (780 kW), but the torque was limited to 685 shp (511 kW). Extensive theoretical design and practical testing was carried out to provide an undercarriage that was tolerant to ground resonance. The first Army Scout AH Mk 1 flew on 4 August 1960, a powered-controls version followed in March 1961 and deliveries started in early 1963. Following trials ranging from Canada to Nairobi, the airframe was released for operations between −26 °C and ISA+30 °C.

== Design ==
Behind the two front seats was a three-seat bench, although this could be replaced with a four-seat bench when fitted with modified rear doors. It was used for general light work, including observation, liaison, training and search & rescue. When fitted as a light attack helicopter, it carried either two, skid-mounted, forward-firing machine gun (L8A1 General Purpose Machine Gun) packs or a single pintle-mounted machine gun in the rear cabin. The pintle mount was available in both port and starboard mountings. The gun-packs, which were both aimed at a pre-set convergence angle, carried 200 rounds of ammunition and were mounted on a tubular spar that was fixed between the front and rear undercarriage legs. In the anti-tank role, it could carry four guided missiles (the Nord SS.11). The sighting unit was the AF.120, the result of a joint venture between Avimo and Ferranti, had x2.5 and x10 magnification. The APX Bezu sight unit was also evaluated but rejected, although it was adopted for use on the Westland Wasp.

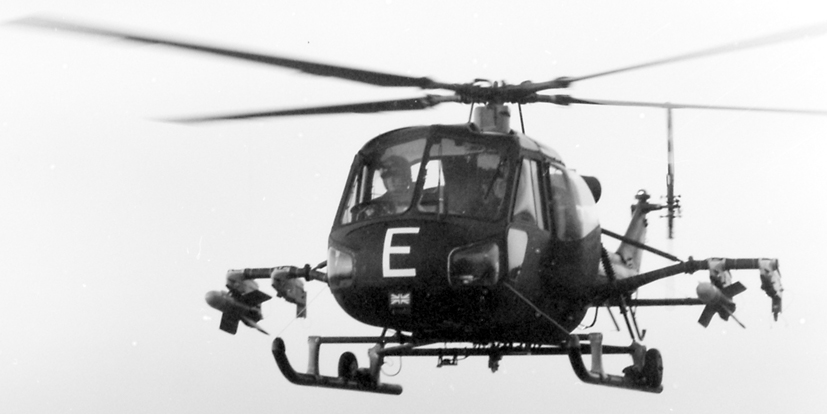
SS.11 equipped Scout of 3 CBAS in 1978

Additional testing and trials were carried out with the Swingfire anti-tank guided missile. Initial firings were carried out in early 1972, to test the "Hawkswing" system for the Westland Lynx, the associated AF.530 gyro-stabilized sight was subsequently trialled in 1974. The Hawkswing system was cancelled in 1975 due to its manual command to line of sight (MCLOS) compared to the semi-automatic (SACLOS) system used by the MILAN missile. In the casualty evacuation role (CASEVAC), the Scout could carry two stretchers internally or two on externally mounted pods, the co-pilot's seat could also be reversed to allow an attendant to face the casualties.

Although the general design of the aircraft was robust, with an airframe fatigue life of 7,200 hours, the cockpit ergonomics were less than perfect. An example of this was the cabin heater switch being mounted next to the fuel cock; this led to the loss of at least four aircraft when the pilot inadvertently closed the fuel cock instead of switching off the cabin heater, causing the engine to shut down. The autorotational qualities of the Scout have also been described by some pilots as 'startling'. In service trials and testing were carried out by the AAC's Development Wing at Middle Wallop, Hampshire. A wide variety of weapons and equipment were evaluated, although many were never adopted. Amongst these were the 7.62mm General Electric Minigun and the two-inch rocket pod. The rocket pods were mounted either side of the central fuselage section on the multi-spar weapon booms and both smooth tube and fin-stabilised rockets were tested, although the accuracy was described as "indifferent". Studies were also carried out for a pintle-mounted M2 Browning machine gun in place of the standard 7.62 GPMG, and the French AME.621 20mm cannon. Another was the installation of a Bendix R.100 lightweight weather and ground-mapping radar, which had a range of eight and 40 miles. This was mounted behind the fibreglass nose access panel along with a small viewing screen in the cockpit. The radar antenna was moved further forward later in the development to improve downward scanning.

During the development of the WG.13 Westland Lynx, two Scouts were used as testbeds and fitted with full-scale, composite construction semi-rigid Lynx main rotor heads as the Scout had the nearest size rotor. The first test flight was achieved 31 August 1970. The first prototype MBB BO 105 tested the airframe with Scout main rotor head and blades but it was destroyed due to ground resonance during its initial trials.

About 150 Scouts were built through 1968, primarily at the Fairey Aviation Division factory at Hayes.

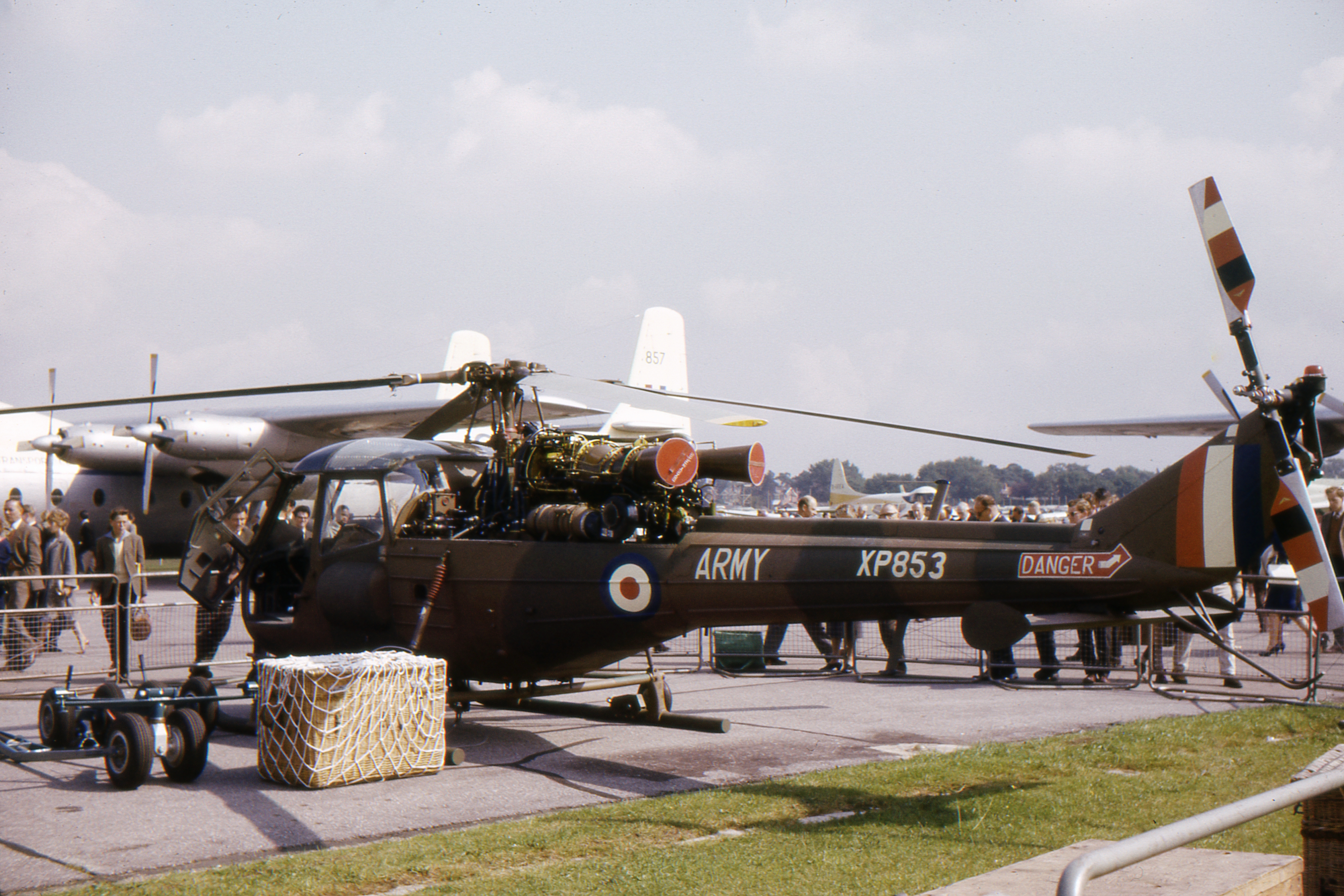
Scout AH.1 at SBAC show, Farnborough 1962

== Operational history ==
The Scout formed the backbone of the Army Air Corps throughout the 1960s and well into the 1970s; the first Scout flew on 29 August 1960 and an initial order for 66 aircraft followed a month after its first flight. Engine problems delayed the introduction of the Scout until 1963, and as an interim measure the Army Air Corps received a small number of Alouette II helicopters. Although the aircraft's entry into service was delayed, the Scout still had a number of teething troubles when it was introduced. One of the earliest losses was XR596, which crashed into the jungle near Kluang airfield in southern Malaya on 16 July 1964, following a fuel pump failure. The two crew died in the incident, Captain Jacot de Boinod and Warrant Officer William John Hutchings. Engine failures were responsible for the loss of at least 11 military and civilian registered aircraft. The engine life of the Nimbus during the early part of its service was notoriously low, with four to six flying hours being the norm. A competition was allegedly held, with a prize to the first unit that could achieve an engine life of 25 flying hours. Operational experience and development work steadily improved the reliability of the Nimbus and by 1964 engine life had improved to two or three engine changes per 1,000 flying hours.

The Scout AH Mk 1 was operated by the Army Air Corps on general light work, including observation and liaison. Like the Wasp, the Scout could be fitted out with different role equipment including flotation gear and a Lucas air-driven hoist which had a lift capacity of 600 lb (270 kg). In the light attack role, it was capable of carrying two forward-firing 7.62mm L7 General Purpose Machine Guns (GPMGs) fixed to the undercarriage skid booms and one fixed or flexible machine gun on the port or starboard side of rear cabin (it is possible to carry two pintle-mounted GPMGs in the cabin, although this would, unsurprisingly, be somewhat cramped). These GPMG combinations were sometimes used in unison to great effect.

The forward firing GPMGs were electrically operated, being fired by the pilot and aimed using a rudimentary system of drawing a small cross on the windscreen with a chinagraph pencil. In sandy conditions, these weapons could jam, which necessitated one of the free crew leaning out of the cockpit door and 'booting' the offending weapon in the hope of clearing it. This procedure was not strictly in accordance with the flight reference cards. The L7A1 pintle-mounted weapon was operated by a door gunner.

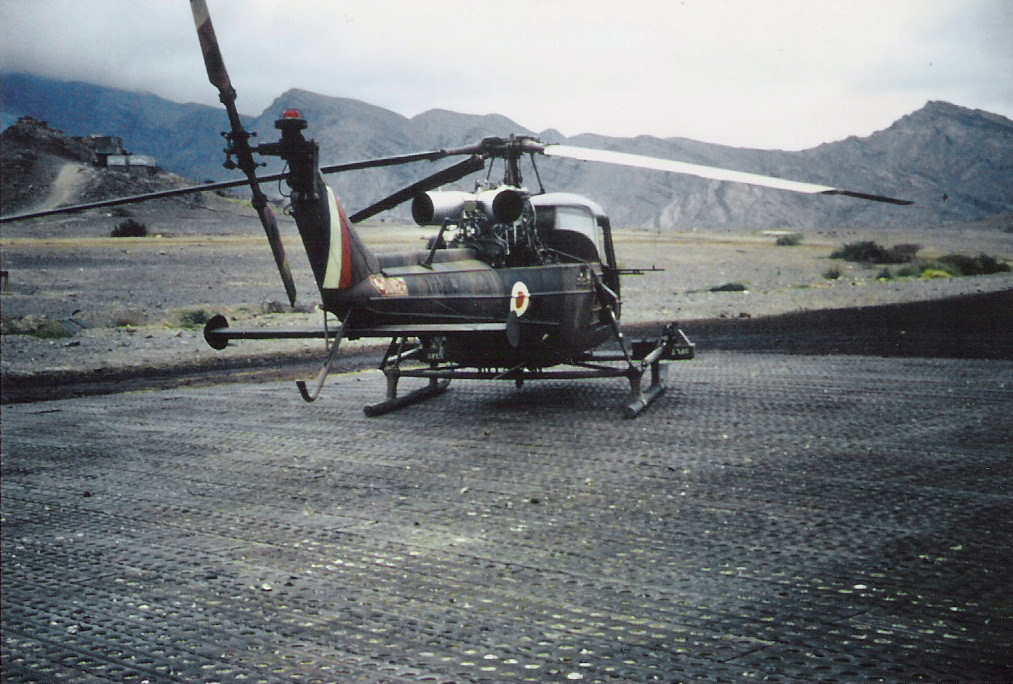
8 Flight Scout AH.1 at Habilayn, Radfan 1967

In the anti-tank role, four SS.11 ATGWs were carried two each side; these could be carried in conjunction with the pintle-mounted GPMG. During the Falklands campaign, the SS.11 achieved some success, being used to attack Argentine positions on 14 June 1982. For nighttime reconnaissance, the Scout could carry four 4.5-inch (110 mm) parachute flares mounted on special carriers. In addition, two smaller parachute flares could be carried to allow emergency landings at night. These were fitted on the starboard rear fuselage on a special attachment point. About 150 Scout helicopters were acquired for the Army Air Corps, which operated them until 1994.

The way British military aviation has been established has meant that the Royal Marines have never actually "owned" their own aircraft. The larger Westland Whirlwind, Westland Wessex and Westland Sea Kings have been Fleet Air Arm helicopters and, like the Westland Lynx AH Mk 7, the Scout AH Mk 1s operated by 3 Commando Brigade Air Squadron (3 CBAS) were British Army helicopters on loan. 3 CBAS flew the Scout from 1971 through to 1982, when it was replaced by the Westland Lynx, and the squadron was eventually renumbered as 847 Naval Air Squadron.

The Scout saw operational service in Borneo during the Indonesia–Malaysia confrontation, the Aden Emergency, Oman (Jebel Akhdar War), Rhodesia, Northern Ireland and then in the South Atlantic.

The Territorial Army (AAC) formed 666 Squadron with a number of Scouts in the late 1980s.

=== Borneo ===
Mystery still surrounds a Scout that went missing 20 September 1965. XR599 set off for a 40-nautical-mile (74 km) night flight from Lundu to Kuching, the mission being to transport a local communist suspect to the Sarawak capital for interrogation. At 23:00 hrs, the aircraft was posted as missing and a search and rescue mission was mounted. Although the aircraft and the remains of the pilot, the escort rifleman and the suspect were never found, a fisherman later dredged up small parts of the aircraft wreckage. On 23 September, the Singapore newspaper The Straits Times, printed a story speculating that the Scout had been hijacked by the prisoner who had somehow managed to capture his escort's weapon and then ordered the pilot to either fly out to sea or over the jungle towards the Indonesian border until they ran out of fuel. Tragedy struck a second time on 25 September when an RAF Westland Whirlwind HAR.10 of 225 Sqn, searching over jungle for XR599, crashed killing the five crew.

=== Aden and Radfan ===
In Aden and Radfan, a number of Scouts were shot down, although these usually resulted in a forced landing and the aircraft were recovered, repaired and returned to service. An example of this occurred on 26 May 1964 when the commanding officer of 3rd Battalion, The Parachute Regiment, Lt Col Anthony Farrar-Hockley, used a Scout to reconnoitre the Wadi Dhubsan area, Radfan. The aircraft was hit by enemy fire and the pilot made an emergency landing behind enemy lines. The aircraft was subsequently recovered; Farrar-Hockley rejoined the unit and was awarded the Bar to his Distinguished Service Order for his leadership. Three Scouts were written off during the campaign, the first, XR634, was through pilot error whilst landing on 16 May 1966. Although initially repairable, this aircraft was subsequently damaged beyond economic repair when it was dropped by the RAF Westland Wessex sent to recover it. The second aircraft, XT635, flew into a hillside during a night patrol at Jebal on 5 May 1967, killing the two crew and the two passengers. The third aircraft, XT641, was destroyed on the ground in an incident where the pilot and his Foreign Office intelligence officer passenger were captured and shot dead by the National Liberation Front after landing in a wadi bed whilst on a flight from Ataq to Mayfa’ah on 3 September 1967. The NLF then set fire to and destroyed the aircraft. On 1 August 1968, Westland Sioux XT123 crashed at Sharjah, Oman, and was subsequently written off when it was dropped by the Westland Scout that was attempting the recovery.

Lt David John Ralls, Royal Corps of Transport, was awarded the DFC for counter-attacking a large group of enemy which had previously attacked an army road repair party on the road to Habilayn. Lt Ralls attack, on 30 May 1967, utilised both the forward-firing and pintle-mounted weapons, forcing the enemy to retreat. Despite his aircraft being hit a number of times, he then directed three Hawker Hunter airstrikes onto the target.

=== Falklands War ===
At the start of Operation Corporate, six Scouts from 3 CBAS were operating alongside three machines from No. 656 Squadron AAC. When the 5th Infantry Brigade landed, they were joined by another three Scouts from 656 Squadron. During the Falklands conflict, the Scout was engaged in casualty evacuation, re-supply and special forces insertion roles. One aircraft, XT629, was one of two Scouts of B Flight, 3 CBAS that was attacked by two FMA IA 58 Pucarás (the only Argentine air-to-air victory in the war) of Grupo 3 near Camilla Creek House, North of Goose Green. XT629 was hit by cannon fire and crashed, killing the pilot and severing the leg of the crewman, who was thrown clear of the wreckage on impact. The second Scout evaded the Pucarás and later returned to the site to evacuate the survivor. Another Scout, XR628, of 656 Sqn AAC, suffered a main rotor gearbox failure whilst in a low hover over MacPhee Pond on 8 June 1982. XR628 had taken cover as two pairs of Douglas A-4 Skyhawks from Grupo 5 approached; these aircraft later attacked the RFA landing ships Sir Galahad and Sir Tristram at Bluff Cove. Once the threat had passed and the pilot began to climb away, the main gearbox failed at the main input drive and the aircraft made a forced landing at the lakeside in around four feet of water. The two crew were picked up another 656 Sqn Scout piloted by Capt J G Greenhalgh later that day. The aircraft was eventually recovered and airlifted to Fitzroy by Sea King on 11 June, but was subsequently written off on its return to the UK. XR628 was also the aircraft that was shot down on 26 May 1964, carrying 3 Para's CO, Lt Col Farrar-Hockley.

Scouts armed with SS.11 anti-tank missiles were used to great effect during the Falklands campaign. On 14 June 1982, an Argentine 105 mm pack howitzer battery dug in to the West of Stanley Racecourse was firing at the Scots Guards as they approached Mount Tumbledown. As the guns were out of range of the MILAN ATGWs of nearby 2nd battalion, Parachute Regiment, their second in command, Major Chris Keeble, contacted Capt J G Greenhalgh of 656 Sqn AAC on the radio and requested a "HELARM" using SS.11 missiles to attack them. As he was engaged in ammunition re-supply, his Scout was not fitted with missile booms – this was in order to reduce weight and increase the aircraft lift capability. Capt Greenhalgh then returned to Estancia House, where his aircraft was refuelled, fitted out, and armed with four missiles in 20 minutes with the rotors still turning. An 'O' group was then held with the crews of two Scouts of 3 CBAS and Capt Greenhalgh took off on a reconnaissance mission, while the other aircraft were fitted out and readied. Within 20 minutes, he had located the target and carried out a detailed reconnaissance of the area. He fired two missiles at the enemy positions and then returned to a pre-arranged RV to meet up and guide in the other two Scouts. The three aircraft, positioned 100 metres apart, then fired a total of 10 missiles (nine missiles hit, one failed) from the ridge overlooking the Argentine positions 3,000 m away and succeeded in hitting the howitzers, nearby bunkers, an ammunition dump and the command post. The Argentine troops returned mortar fire, a round landing directly in front of Capt Greenhalgh's Scout.

=== Northern Ireland ===
In Northern Ireland, the Scout pioneered the use of the Heli-Tele aerial surveillance system, having a gyro-stabilised Marconi unit shoe-horned into the rear cabin. The Heli-Tele unit weighed some 700 lb (320 kg), although later developments reduced this significantly. The aircraft was also used for mounting Eagle patrols. In this role, the rear cabin doors and seats were removed and four troops sat in the rear cabin with their feet resting on the skids. Operating with two aircraft in unison, this allowed an eight-man patrol to be quickly inserted into an area and mount snap vehicle check points (VCPs) if necessary. Up until 1973, the standard tail rotor colour scheme for the Scout was bands of red and white. On 14 September 1973, a soldier died during training at Gosford Castle, Armagh, after coming into contact with the tail rotor blades whilst the aircraft was on the ground. Following this accident, the tail rotor blade colour scheme was changed to the distinctive black and white bands.

Because of the specialist nature of operations in Northern Ireland, a particularly important piece of role equipment was introduced in the form of the "Nightsun" 3.5 million candlepower searchlight. Operations at night were greatly enhanced with the introduction of night vision goggles, although these missions could still be hazardous. This was evident on the night of 2 December 1978, when the pilot of XW614, 659 Sqn, became disorientated during a sortie and crashed into Lough Ross, killing the two crew. XW614 was the last of five Scouts written off during operations in the province.

=== Exports ===
Unlike its naval counterpart, the Scout did not achieve the same export success as the Wasp, with the Royal Jordanian Air Force acquiring three helicopters, two were operated in Uganda, and Bahrain had two helicopters, which were operated by the Bahrain Public Security Force in police service roles. The Scout never received civilian airworthiness certification, which prevented it from being sold to civilian operators, and meant that the design was used exclusively by the army from the outset. All current operators require an 'Experimental' certificate to fly them.

Two Scout helicopters were acquired by the Royal Australian Navy (RAN) in April 1963 and were operated by 723 Naval Air Squadron, with the aircraft being rotated aboard the hydrographic survey ship HMAS Moresby. The RAN Scouts proved the practicalities of operating helicopters from small ships for the RAN, and the RAN operated these helicopters up until 1973, when they were replaced by Bell 206B-1 Kiowas. The RAN experience with the Scouts aboard HMAS Moresby illustrated the need for a higher-level maintenance regime as a result of operating the helicopters in areas with high concentrations of abrasive coral sand encountered around the Australian coastline and the detrimental effect that it had on the rotor blades, airframe and engine components. Despite the additional effort to maintain the helicopters, the Scouts were considered to be superior to the seaplanes and flying boats that had previously been used in this role. One of the Scouts ditched in Wewak Harbour while taking off from HMAS Moresby in April 1967; it was subsequently recovered but the aircraft was deemed to be written off.

=== Surviving aircraft ===
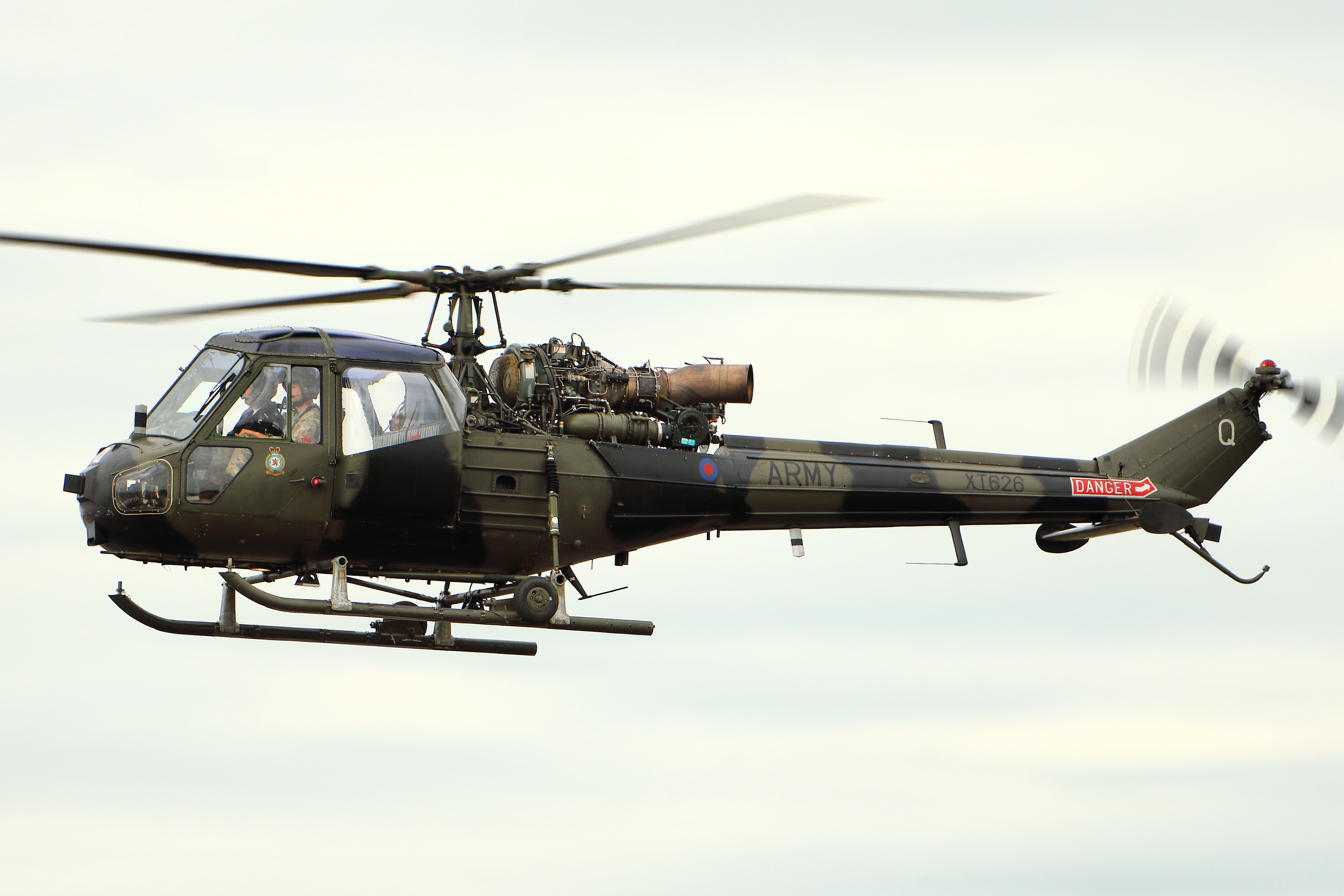
Survivor Westland Scout flying in the Royal International Air Tattoo 2015

Although none are operational in military roles, there are still Scouts in the air; mainly in the UK; as of 2014 there were 10 Scouts remaining on the UK civil register, including the Army Air Corp's Historic Flight's aircraft.

Outside the UK, the last of six Scouts that were exported to New Zealand have been withdrawn from use, leaving only ZS-HAS flying in South Africa operating.

== Accidents and incidents ==
- XR638 3 January 1966: While serving with 21 Flt, UK, the aircraft encountered engine problems caused by the inadvertent closure of the fuel cock in mistake for the heater control, during a delivery flight from Wroughton to Middle Wallop. The aircraft subsequently lost height and crashed tail first at Marlborough, Wiltshire. It then caught fire and burnt out killing the two crew.
- XV120 6 June 1967: While serving with 10 Flight, the aircraft crashed into the ground at the corner of Long Cross housing estate at Felton near Bristol Airport, just before 9 am, killing the pilot and the two other occupants.
- XT625 30 January 1968: While serving with 11 Flt, Malaysia, the aircraft suffered an engine failure and force landed into the jungle near Gerik, 10 miles (16 km) from Butterworth, Malaysia, killing one soldier and injuring the other two occupants.
- XR640 14 May 1969: While serving with 6 Flight, the aircraft was involved in a mid-air collision with a Sioux helicopter over Chattendon Barracks, Rochester, Kent. The Scout was taking off and the Sioux coming in to land. The pilot of the Scout, and the two occupants of the Sioux, XT802 of 3rd Royal Tank Regiment Air Troop, were killed. L/Cpl Sindall and Sapper Pedley Royal Engineers were awarded the BEM for gallantry in attempting to rescue "with complete disregard for [their] personal safety", along with a civilian, the occupants.
- XR636 12 April 1974: While serving with 664 Sqn, Northern Ireland, the aircraft flew into rising ground at Rich Hill near Portadown, County Armagh, killing the pilot.
- XV133 9 January 1976: While serving with 662 Sqn, Northern Ireland, the aircraft crashed near Crossmaglen, Armagh, after the pilot became disorientated flying into low cloud at night. Both the pilot and the passenger were killed.
- XV132 10 April 1978: While serving with 658 Sqn, Northern Ireland, the aircraft crashed into Lough Neagh about four miles from take-off after flying into a snow storm. Both the pilot and the passenger, a 17-year-old cadet, were killed.

== Popular culture ==
- The Scout featured in the 1982 cinema film Who Dares Wins, displaying their use by the British Army's Special Air Service Regiment. The aircraft in the film-shoot were from No. 656 Squadron AAC.
- A 'wrecked' Scout featured on a beach scene in a 2008 Royal Marine recruitment film. The 45-second advert was filmed in Brunei and featured Malay actors posing as terrorists. The film, which cost £1million, was later withdrawn due to the inference that Malaysians could be involved with terrorism.

== Variants ==
Saunders-Roe P.531
Prototype.
Saunders-Roe P.531-2 Mk.1
Pre-production aircraft.
Scout AH.1
Five/six-seat light utility helicopter for the British Army

== Operators ==
=== Military operators ===
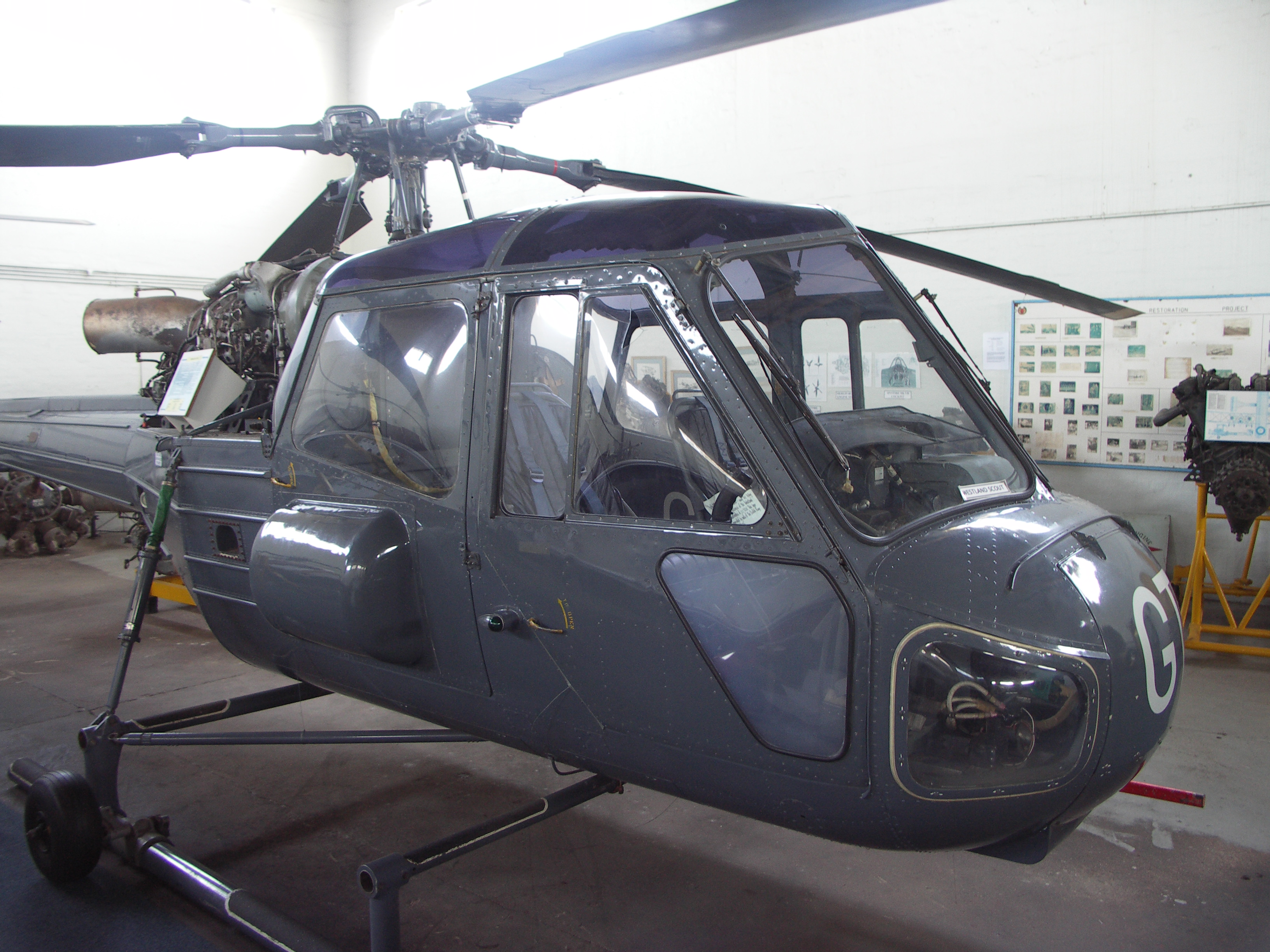
Scout at the SAAF museum, Port Elizabeth, South Africa

Australia

- Royal Australian Navy

South Africa

- South African Air Force

United Kingdom

- British Army Air Corps
- Empire Test Pilots' School
- Royal Marines

=== Government operators ===
Bahrain

- Bahrain State Police

Uganda

- Uganda Police Air Wing

== Specifications (Scout) ==

Data from Jane's All The World's Aircraft 1965–66

General characteristics

- Crew: 1 or 2
- Capacity: 4 or 5 passengers / 1,500 lb (680 kg) slung load
- Length: 30 ft 4 in (9.25 m)
- Height: 8 ft 11 in (2.72 m)
- Airfoil: NACA 0012
- Empty weight: 3,232 lb (1,466 kg)
- Max takeoff weight: 5,300 lb (2,404 kg)
- Powerplant: 1 × Rolls-Royce Nimbus 101 or 102 turboshaft engine, 685 shp (511 kW) derated from 1,050 shp
- Main rotor diameter: 32 ft 3 in (9.83 m)
- Main rotor area: 816.9 sq ft (75.89 m^{2})

Performance

- Maximum speed: 131 mph (211 km/h, 114 kn)
- Cruise speed: 122 mph (196 km/h, 106 kn)
- Never exceed speed: 132 mph (212 km/h, 115 kn)
- Range: 315 mi (507 km, 274 nmi)
- Service ceiling: 17,700 ft (5,400 m)
- Hover ceiling IGE: 12,500 ft (3,810 m)
- Rate of climb: 1,670 ft/min (8.5 m/s)
- Disk loading: 6.48 lb/sq ft (31.6 kg/m^{2})
- Power/mass: 0.13 hp/lb (0.21 kW/kg)

Armament

- Guns: 1 or 2 x L7 GPMG machine guns
- Missiles: 4 x SS.11 anti-tank guided missiles

== See also ==
Related development

- Saunders-Roe Skeeter
- Saunders-Roe P.531
- Westland Wasp

Aircraft of comparable role, configuration, and era

- Aérospatiale Alouette II
- Aérospatiale Alouette III
- Kamov Ka-15

Related lists

- List of aircraft of the Army Air Corps (United Kingdom)
