= Westland Wisp =

Wisp
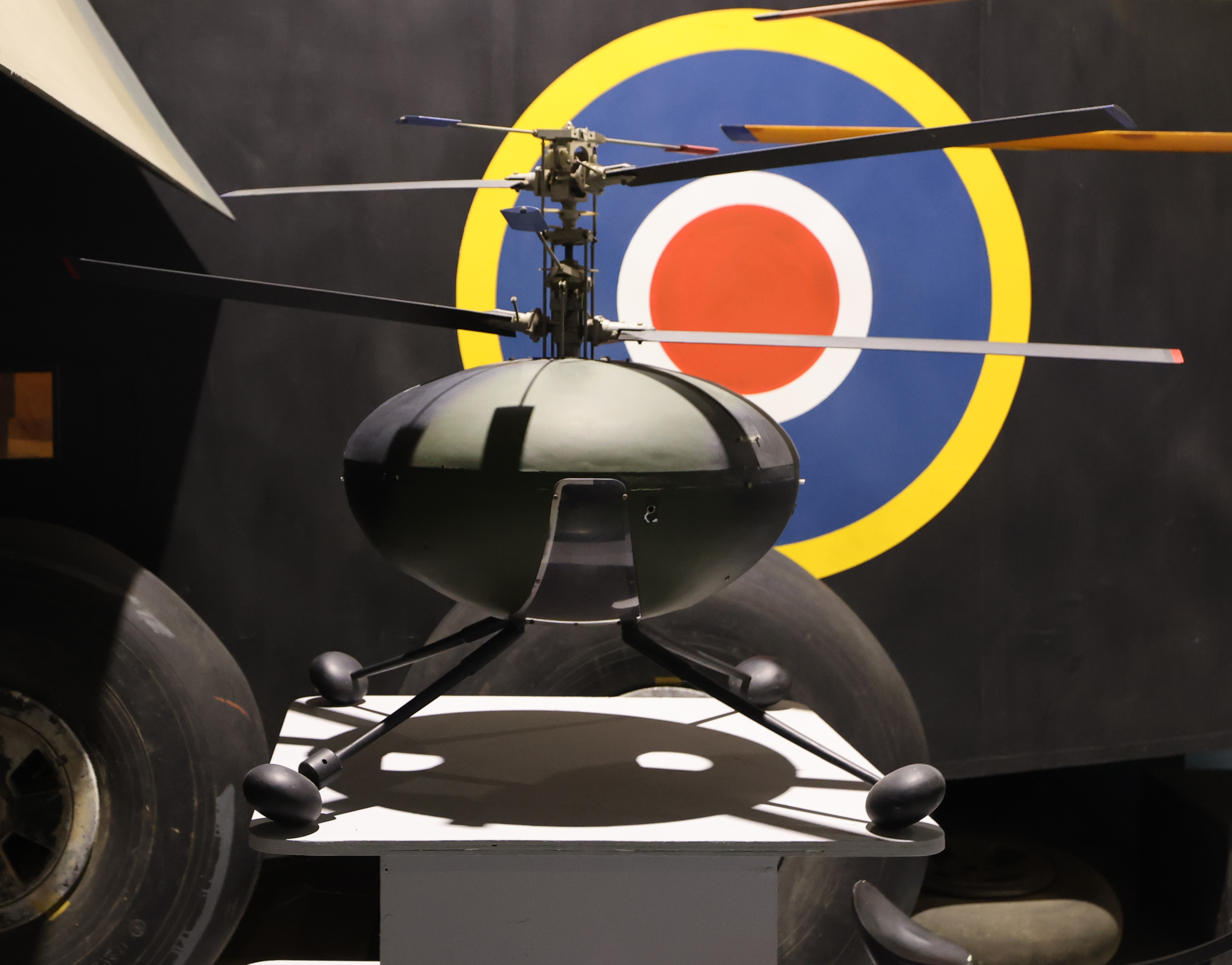
- A Westland Wisp at the Museum of Army Flying

General information
- Type: UAV helicopter
- Manufacturer: Westland
- Status: retired
- Number built: 3

History
- First flight: 1976
- Developed from: Wesland Mote
- Developed into: Westland Wideye WG-25 / WR-07

The Westland Wisp was an unmanned coaxial helicopter developed by Westland Helicopters. It was powered by a pair of 5 hp (3.7 kW) Korba twin cylinder two-stroke engines.
