= Westland Helicopters =

UK aerospace company, 1961–2000

- Industry: Aircraft
- Predecessor: Westland Aircraft; Bristol Aeroplane Company; Fairey Aviation Company; Saunders-Roe
- Founded: 1961
- Defunct: 2000
- Fate: Merged with Agusta
- Successor: AgustaWestland
- Headquarters: Yeovil, Somerset, United Kingdom
- Products: Rotary-wing aircraft
- Parent: GKN (1994–2000)

Westland Helicopters was a British aircraft manufacturer. Originally Westland Aircraft, the company focused on helicopters after the Second World War. It was amalgamated with several other British firms in 1960 and 1961.

In 2000, it merged with Italian helicopter manufacturer Agusta to form AgustaWestland. In 2016, AgustaWestland merged into Leonardo, where it became the company's helicopters division under the Leonardo Helicopters brand.

== History ==
=== Origins ===
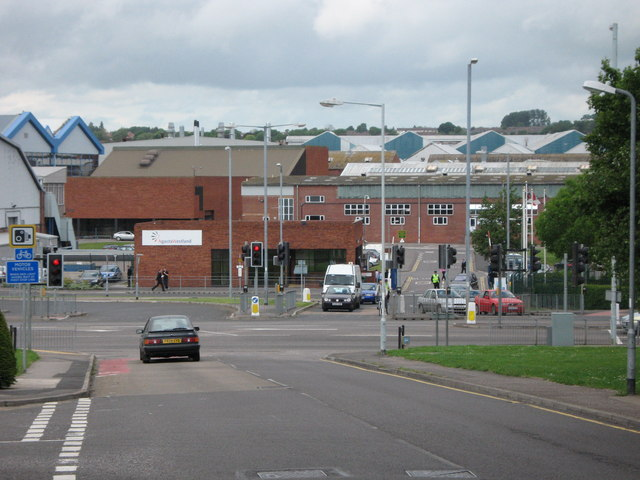
Entrance to AgustaWestland's works in Yeovil, England

Westland Aircraft was founded in 1935 when Petters Limited separated its aircraft manufacturing from its aircraft engine concerns. During the Second World War the company produced military aircraft including the Lysander, the Whirlwind and the Welkin.

After the war, the company began to build helicopters under a licensing agreement with Sikorsky. From the mid-1950s the company came to increasingly concentrate on helicopters, eventually to the exclusion of other types. Production started with the Sikorsky S-51, which became the Westland Dragonfly, flying for the first time in 1948 and entering service with the Royal Navy and Royal Air Force in 1953. Westland developed an improved version, the Widgeon, which was not a great success. Success with the Dragonfly was repeated with the Sikorsky S-55 which became the Whirlwind, and a re-engined turboshaft powered Sikorsky S-58 as the Wessex.

=== 1960s ===
The chairmanship of Eric Mensforth from 1953 to 1968 marked the start of the transition, which was aided by the government when in 1959–1961 they forced the merger of the 20 or so aviation firms into three groups. British Aircraft Corporation and Hawker Siddeley Group took over fixed-wing designs, while the helicopter divisions of Bristol, Fairey and Saunders-Roe (with their hovercraft) were merged with Westland to form Westland Helicopters in 1961.

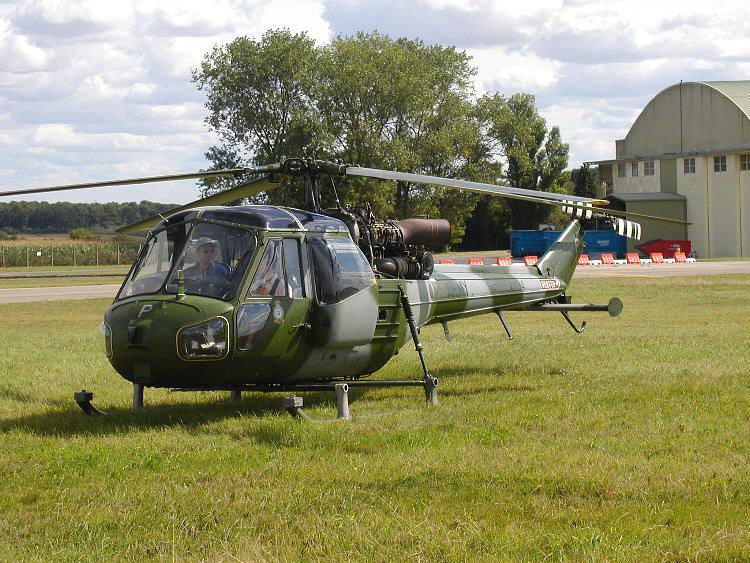
Privately owned ex-military Westland Scout AH.1 (XV134)

Westland inherited the Saro Skeeter helicopter, a development of the Cierva W.14 Skeeter and the Fairey Rotodyne compound gyroplane design. They continued to develop the latter, terminating their own Westland Westminster large transport design.

The company continued to produce other aircraft under licence from Sikorsky (Sea King) and Bell (Sioux). They also produced their own designs: the Westland Scout and its naval variant the Westland Wasp from the P.531, which found favour with the Army Air Corps and Fleet Air Arm respectively.

In the late 1960s, the company began a collaboration with Aérospatiale to licence-manufacture two new helicopters, the Aérospatiale Puma and Aérospatiale Gazelle. Westland also began developing the Westland Lynx to replace the Scout.

=== 1970s ===
Through Saunders-Roe, Westland became first a part owner then, from 1970, the sole owner of the British Hovercraft Corporation, subsequently trading as Westland Aerospace. Most designs were Saunders-Roe or Saunders-Roe derivatives.

For many years Westland owned the main London heliport at Battersea.

=== 1980s ===
The company gradually fell into unprofitability. Sikorsky approached with a bail-out deal in 1985 that split the cabinet and led to the resignation of Defence Secretary Michael Heseltine in January 1986 over the fate of Britain's sole helicopter manufacturer. The split, which became known as the Westland affair, was over whether to push the company into a European deal or accept the US company's offer, with Heseltine preferring the European option. Eventually the link with Sikorsky was accepted with an expectation to licence-manufacture the Blackhawk, but the order was never placed. This saw both Sikorsky and Fiat acquire minority shareholdings in Westland. In 1988 GKN bought a 22% share of Westland from Hanson plc and Fiat.

In 1984, Westland proposed the WG 44 light attack helicopter based on the Lynx dynamics, incorporating low observable technologies derived from its SUPERVISOR and PHOENIX UAS projects experience in 1977–1983. In 1987, in parallel with the Agusta A129 supported by Westland, Fokker, MBB and CASA, its WG 47 development was completed as a confidential private venture with a faceted fuselage, internal weapons and twin canted tail rotors. A side-exiting infrared suppressor integrated the exhausts and its tandem cockpit with the pilot in front had transparencies angled outward to eliminate optical glint. This presaged the US Army Boeing–Sikorsky RAH-66 Comanche, rolled out in 1995 and cancelled in 2004, while the fuselage shaping was retained for the NH90.

=== 1990s ===
In the 1990s, the company returned to profitability and grew as a result of several major contracts from the UK Ministry of Defence for the EH101 Merlin, developed with Agusta, and for 67 licence-built Boeing AH-64 Apache attack helicopters, designated the WAH-64 and entering full operational service in 2005.

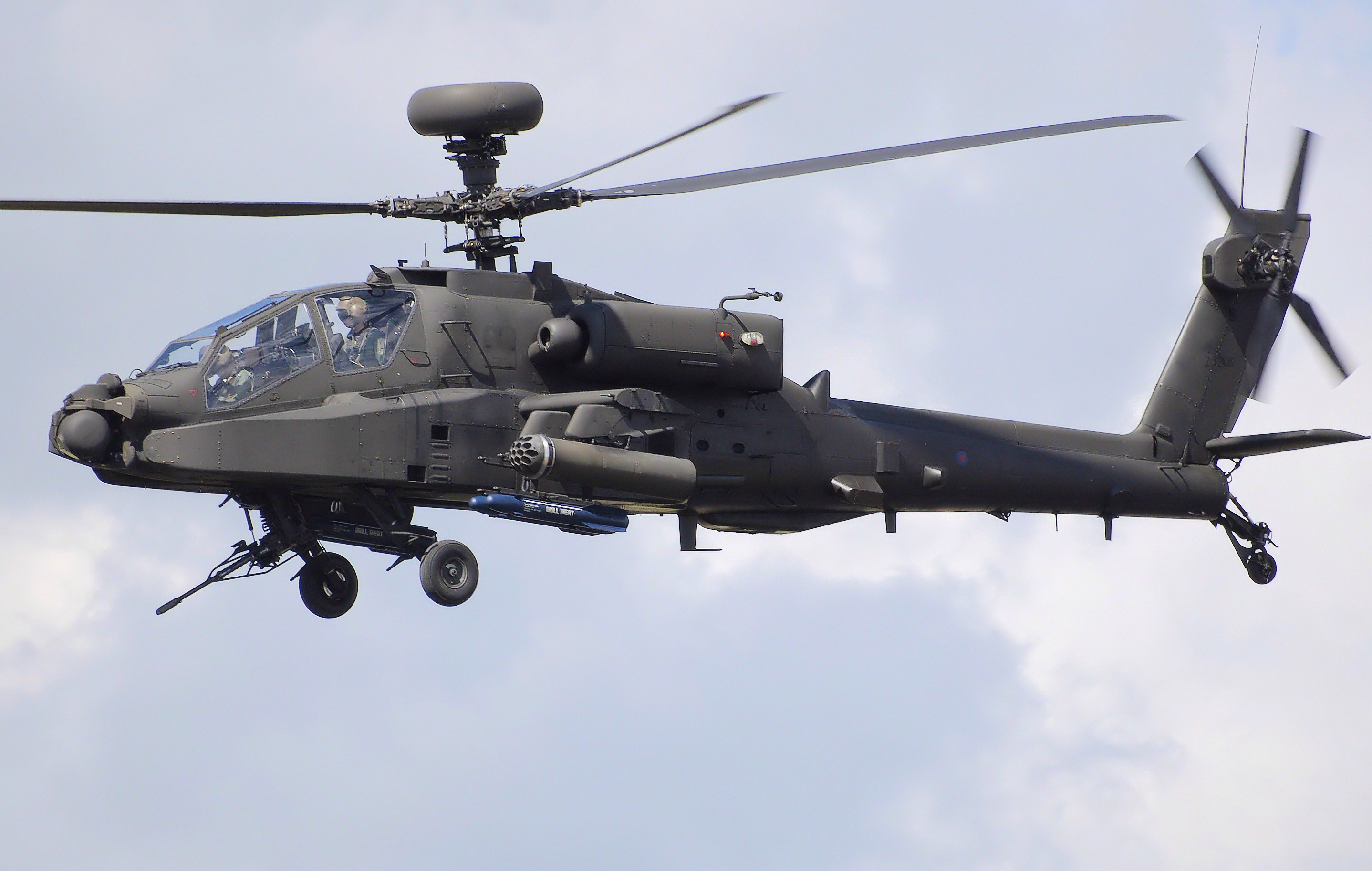
UK Army Air Corps Westland Apache WAH-64D Longbow displays at a UK airshow

In April 1994, Westland became a wholly owned subsidiary of GKN. In 2000 GKN and Finmeccanica agreed to merge their Westland and Agusta helicopter subsidiaries into a joint venture, Agusta Westland. GKN contributed Westland, its 50% share in its EH Industries (EHI) joint venture with Finmeccanica, the GKN aerospace transmissions business, and a 50% share in Aviation Training International. Finmeccanica contributed Agusta, including its transmissions and structures business, its share of EHI, its share of NH Industries, and its share of Bell Helicopter Textron.

On 26 May 2004, GKN confirmed that it had agreed to sell its share of AgustaWestland to Finmeccanica for £1.06 billion. The sale was approved by the British government in October 2004.

The former Westland site at the now unused airfield in Weston-super-Mare houses The Helicopter Museum featuring a number of examples of Westland aircraft.

== Products ==
=== Helicopters ===
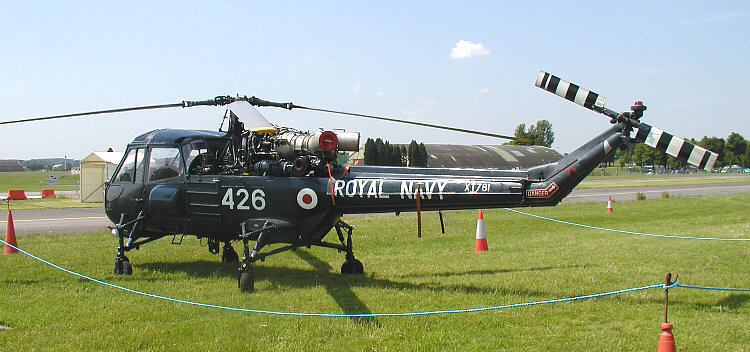
Privately owned ex-military Westland Wasp HAS.1.

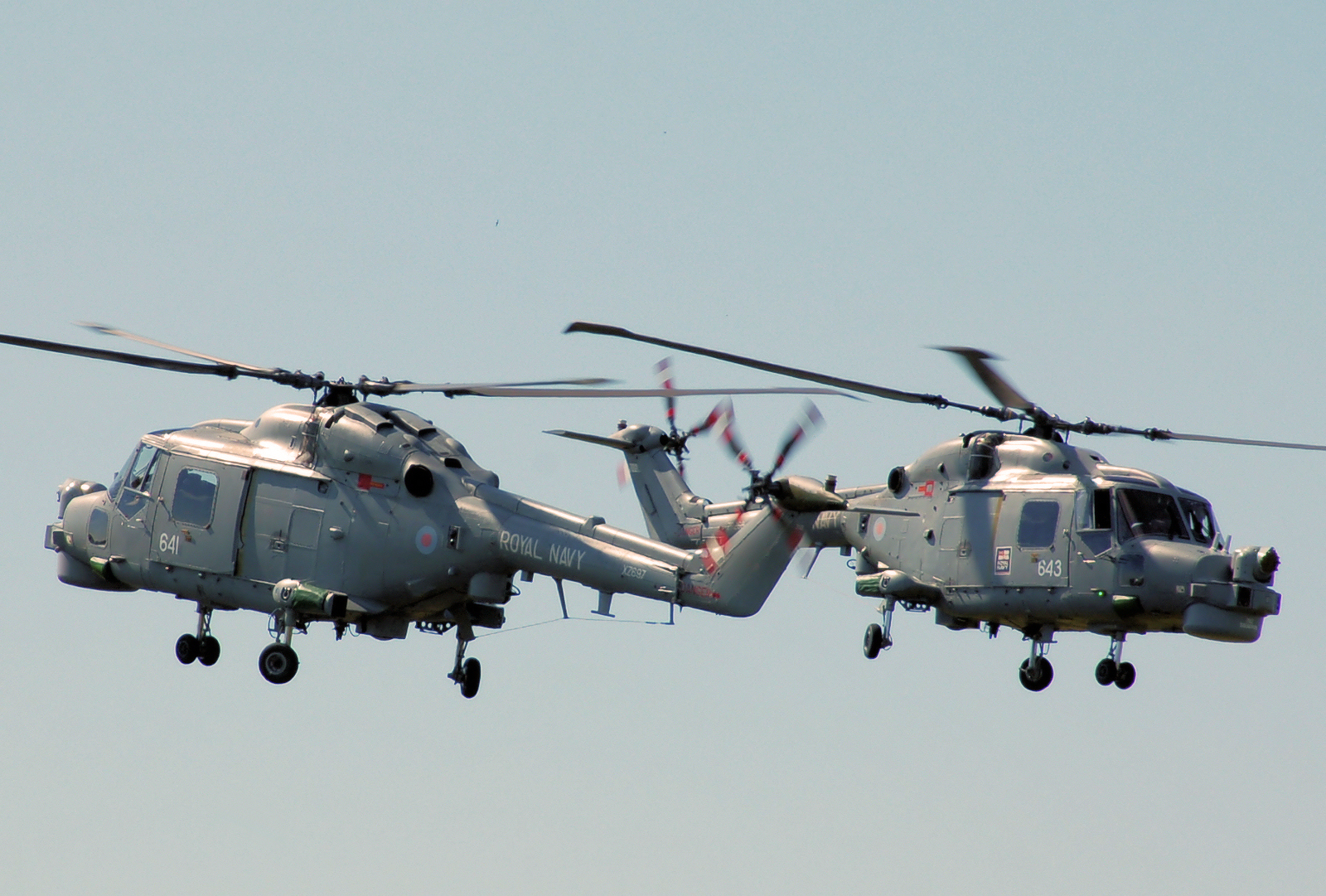
Westland Lynx helicopters of the Royal Navy Black Cats display team

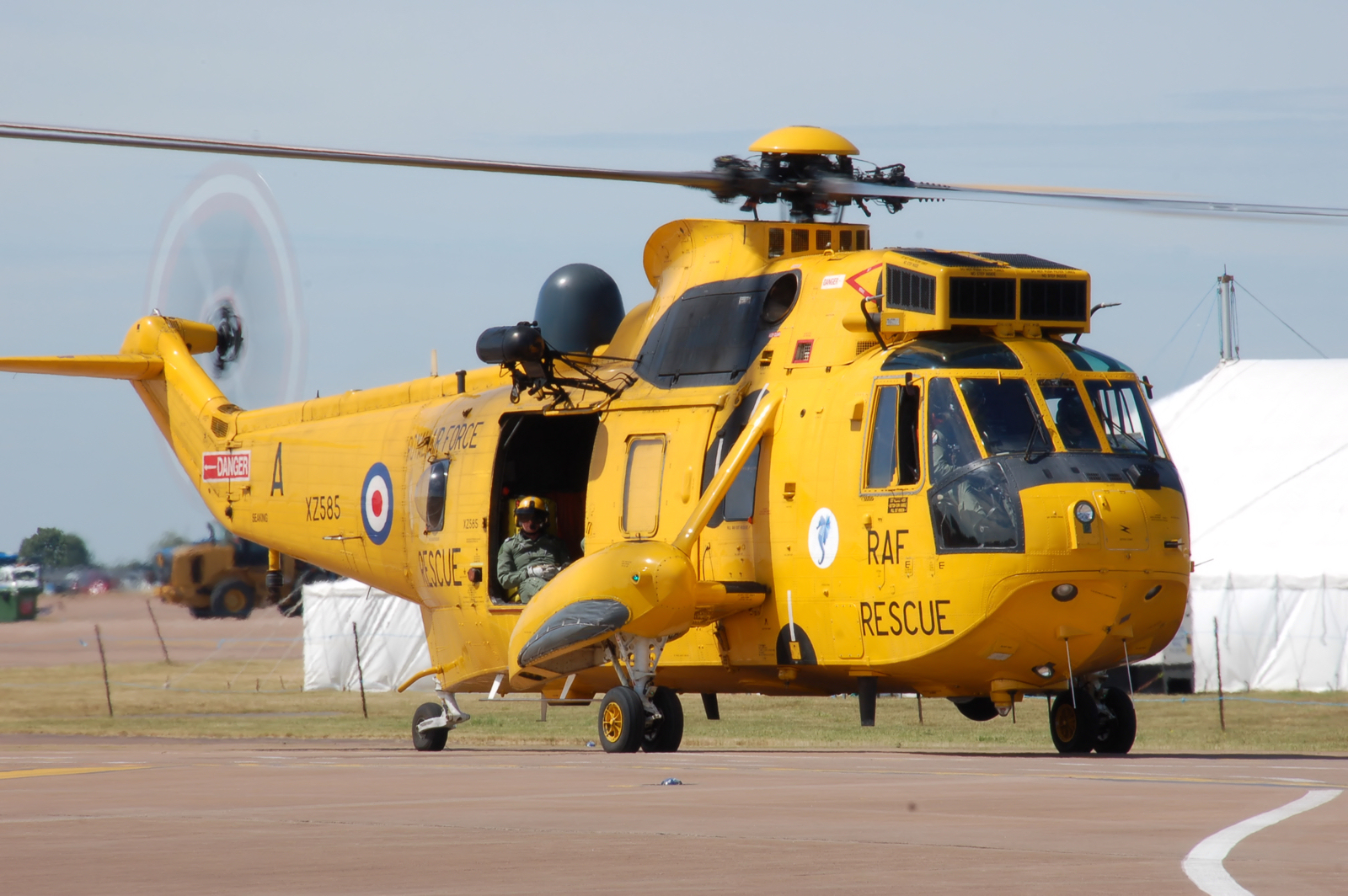
RAF Westland Sea King

- WS-51 - Westland Dragonfly
- WS-55 - Westland Whirlwind
- Westland Widgeon
- WG-58 - Westland Wessex
- Westland Westminster (1958) – prototype stage only
- Westland Scout
- Westland Wasp
- Westland Sioux
- WS-61 - Westland Sea King
- Westland Puma
- Westland Gazelle
- WG.13 - Westland Lynx
- WG.30 - Westland 30
- EHI EH101
- Westland WAH-64 Apache
- Bristol Belvedere
- Fairey Rotodyne

=== Hovercraft ===
- GKN Westland AP1-88

=== Rockets and missiles ===
- Black Arrow

=== Precision gears ===
- Airship Industries Skyship 500 - transmission system

=== Unmanned aerial vehicles ===
- Westland Mote
- Westland Wisp
- Westland Wideye

== See also ==
- Aerospace industry in the United Kingdom
