= Bristol Siddeley Nimbus =

1950s British turboshaft aircraft engine

Nimbus
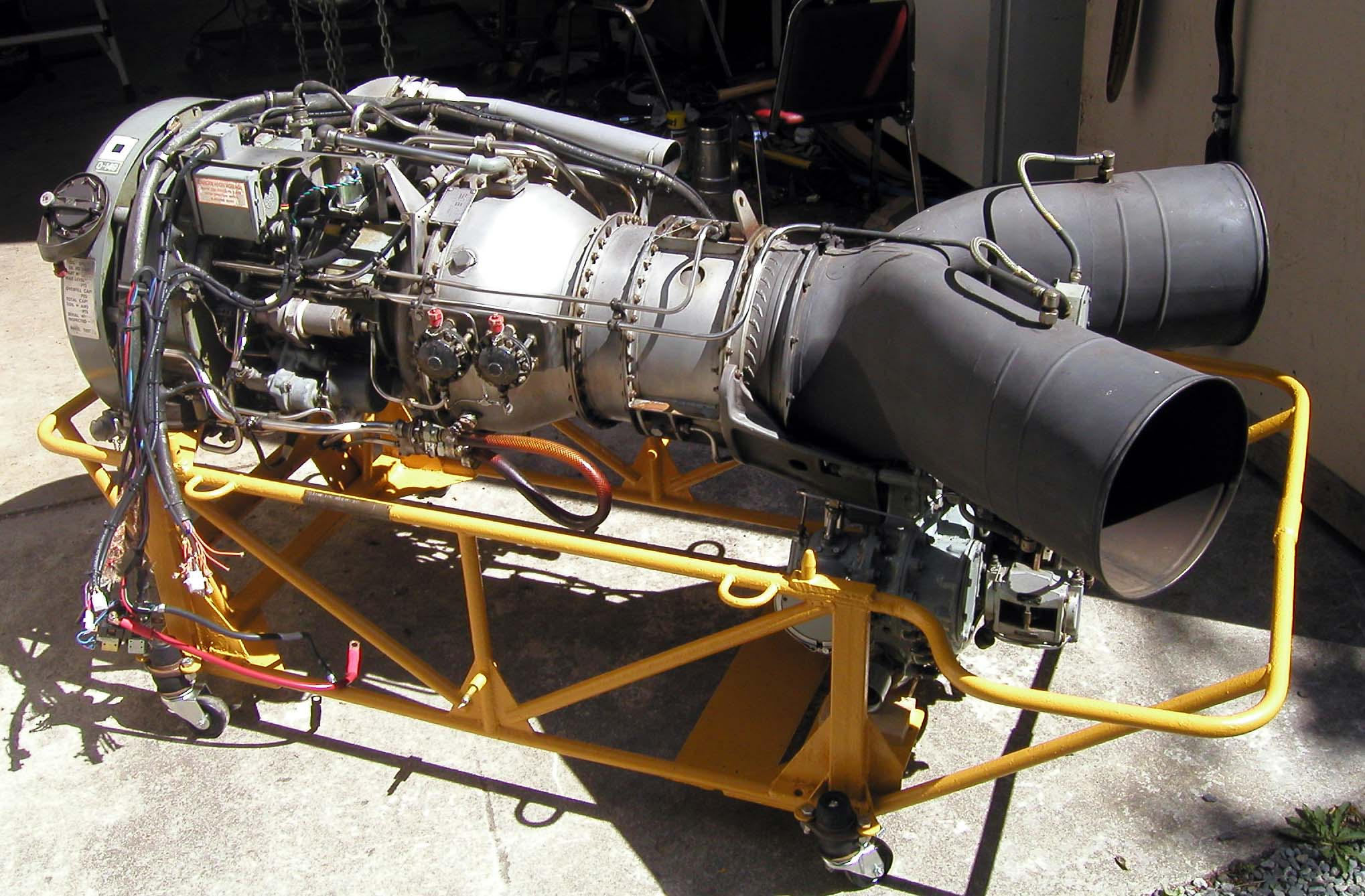
- Nimbus Mark 103
- Type: Turboshaft aircraft engine
- Manufacturer: Bristol Siddeley
- First run: July 1958
- Major applications: Westland Scout; Westland Wasp
- Developed from: Turbomeca Turmo

The Bristol Siddeley Nimbus, later known as the Rolls-Royce Nimbus, was a British turboshaft engine developed under license by Blackburn Aircraft Ltd. from the Turbomeca Turmo in the late 1950s. It was used on the Westland Scout and Westland Wasp helicopters.

== Design and development ==
The Nimbus is a turboshaft engine comprising a gas generator section, which consists of a three-stage compressor, (two axial stages and one centrifugal stage), driven by a two-stage turbine in conjunction with an annular combustion chamber, and a power output section consisting of a single-stage free turbine driving an output shaft via a two-stage reduction gearbox.

In the Scout and Wasp the main rotor drive is taken from the front of the gearbox and is transmitted beneath the gas generator via a flexible coupling, while the drive for the tail rotor is taken from the rear of the gearbox.

The fuel system is designed to control and govern the engine under all operating conditions and to provide safeguards against malfunctions, the pilot selecting rotor speed and the governing element automatically maintaining the rotor speed within close limits under varying conditions of load.

The lubrication system is self-contained, the oil tank being integral with the air intake casing.

Engine and helicopter accessories are mounted on a gearbox located on the air intake casing.

== Variants ==
The Nimbus engines were produced in two main variants, the Mark 103/503 and the Mark 105/502. The Mark 103/503 is generally similar to the Mark 105/502 except that the former has a double-caliper disc brake incorporated in the output drive shaft to provide adequate braking of the helicopter's rotor in the high winds encountered over the deck of a fast moving ship, whereas the 105/502 has a single caliper unit.

- Blackburn-Turbomeca A.129:
- BnN.1 Nimbus:
- BnN.2 Nimbus:
- BnN.2/1 Nimbus:
- BnN.2/2 Nimbus:
- Nimbus 500:
- Nimbus 502: (Mk.105)
- Nimbus 503: (Mk.103)
- Nimbus Mk.103:
- Nimbus Mk.105:

== Applications ==
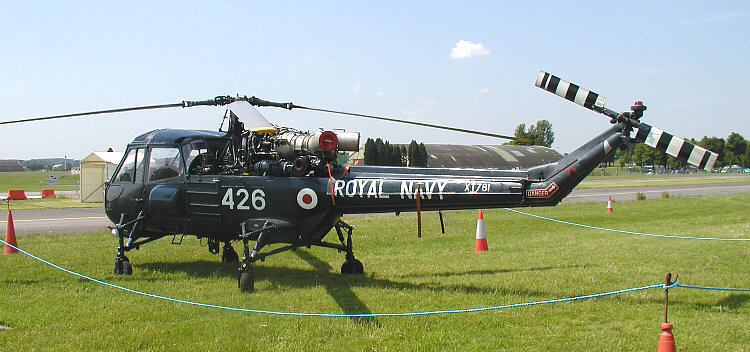
Nimbus engine installed on Westland Wasp helicopter

- Westland Scout
- Westland Wasp
- Saunders-Roe SR.N2, Hovercraft

== Specifications (Nimbus) ==
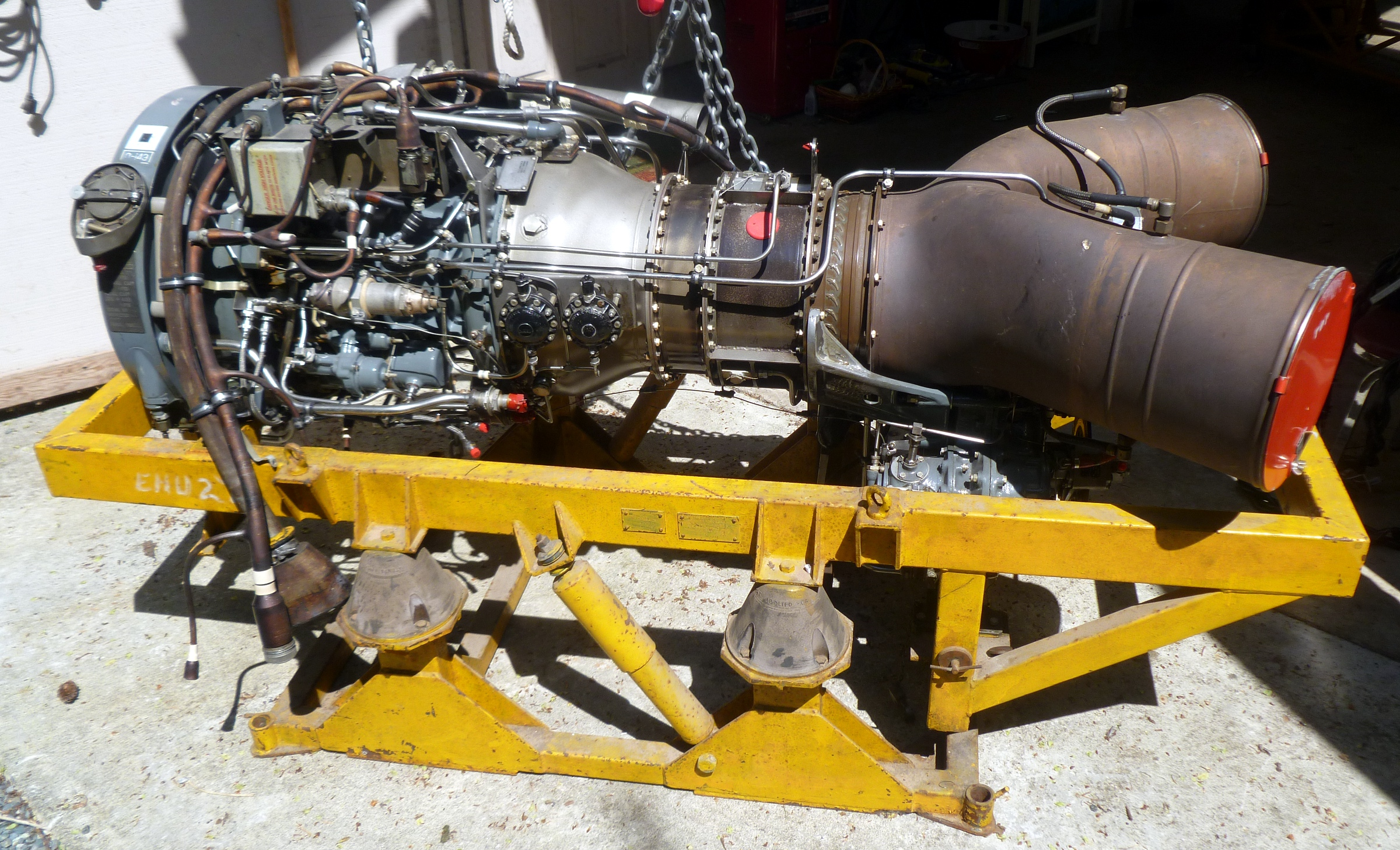
Nimbus Mark 105

Data from Flight global archive and

==== General characteristics ====
- Type: Turboshaft
- Length: 73.7 in (187 cm)
- Diameter: 38.7 in (98 cm) across exhaust ducts
- Dry weight: 670 lb (300 kg)

==== Components ====
- Compressor: Two-stage axial, single-stage centrifugal
- Combustors: Annular
- Turbine: Two-stage axial gas generator, single-stage power
- Fuel type: NATO F-30,34,40,42,44 Diesel, Gasoline(100 hrs)
- Oil system: Dual scavenge, NATO O-149

==== Performance ====
- Maximum power output: 968 shp (722 kW)
- Overall pressure ratio: 6.4:1
- Air mass flow: 11.1 lb/s (5 kg/s)
- Turbine inlet temperature: 877 °C internal/EGT 550 °C max
- Fuel consumption: 595 lb/h (270 kg/h)
- Specific fuel consumption: 0.681
- Power-to-weight ratio: 1.44 shp/lb (2.37 kW/kg)

== See also ==
Comparable engines

- Rolls-Royce Gem

Related lists

- List of aircraft engines
