= Saunders-Roe Skeeter =

Training and Scout Helicopter built by Saunders-Roe

Skeeter
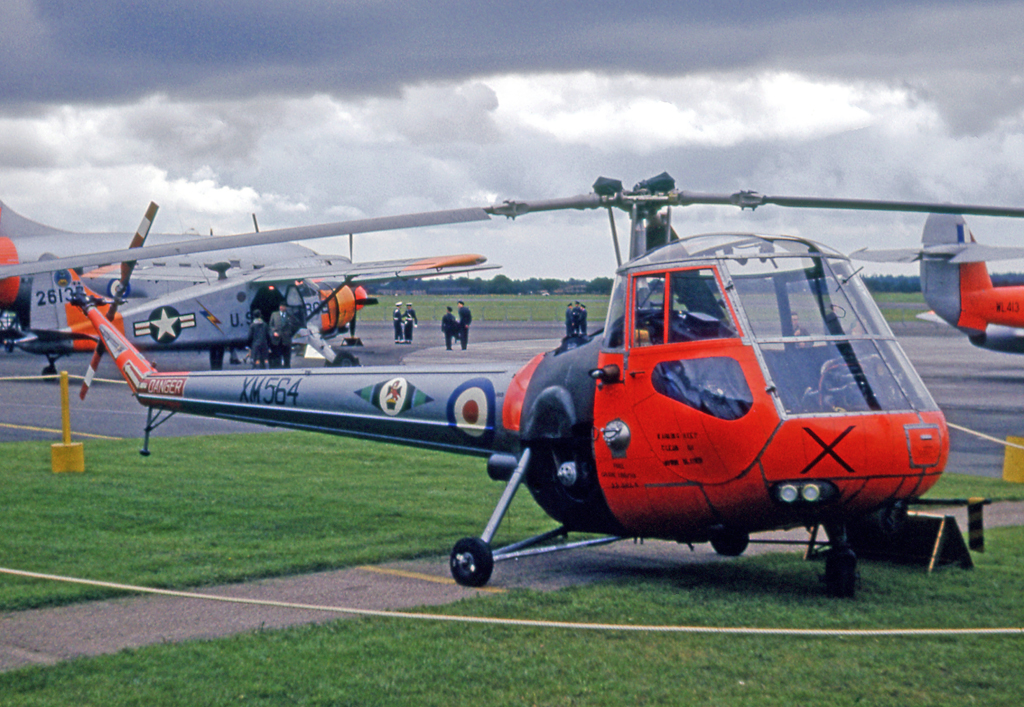
- Skeeter AOP.12 of the Central Flying School of the Royal Air Force, 1962

General information
- Type: Trainer, Scout
- Manufacturer: Saunders-Roe
- Primary users: British Army Royal Air Force; German Army; German Navy
- Number built: 78 + 10 prototypes

History
- Introduction date: October 1956
- First flight: 10 October 1948 (as Cierva W.14 Skeeter)

The Saunders-Roe Skeeter is a two-seat training and scout helicopter that was developed and produced by British manufacturer Saunders-Roe ("Saro") of Cowes and Southampton, in the United Kingdom.

Work on what would become the Skeeter had been commenced by the Cierva Autogiro Company as the Cierva W.14. Following Saunders-Roe's takeover of Cierva's helicopter development contracts, it was decided to continue its projects, including the Skeeter. Despite an initial preference for the rival Fairey Ultra-light Helicopter, which had already been ordered, there was a reversal of fortune with interest from the Bundeswehr in the potential procurement of a large number of Skeeters. This led to the British order for the Ultra-light Helicopter being cancelled and the Skeeter effectively taking its place, which also served to guarantee an export order from Germany.

During the late 1950s, the Skeeter entered service with the British Army Air Corps, the German Navy, and the German Army. It has the distinction of being the first helicopter to be used by the Army Air Corps. While some consideration had been made to developing a version of the Skeeter powered by a turbine engine instead of a piston engine, it was decided to produce the developmental Saro P.531 for this purpose instead of a more direct Skeeter derivative.

In the 21st century, a number of examples are preserved as museum pieces in the UK, Germany, and Poland.

== Development ==
Skeeter hangs in a museum

=== Origins ===
In 1947, the Cierva Autogiro Company commenced work on a new project, which was designated as the W.14 Skeeter. As designed, it was a relatively compact two-seat helicopter, intended to be suitable for use as both a civilian aircraft and for aerial observation duties with military customers. The original engine selected to power the Skeeter was a single 110 hp Jameson FF-1 air-cooled horizontally opposed piston engine. On 10 October 1948, the first prototype Skeeter performed its maiden flight at Eastleigh airfield. Initial flight trials of the prototype proved the rotorcraft to be underpowered, which was partially as a result of the experimental Jameson engine being prone to overheating. In response, the company decided to develop an improved Mark 2 Skeeter which was to be equipped with the well-established de Havilland Gipsy Major 10, which provided 145 hp (108 kW). The Mark 2 Skeeter was a noticeably larger aircraft and had a different appearance.

On 20 October 1949, the larger Skeeter Mark 2 performed its first flight. Powered tests using the rotorcraft soon made it apparent that the Mark 2 suffered from severe ground resonance problems. Cierva found it difficult to resolve these issues; on 26 June 1950, the Skeeter Mark 2 was destroyed during ground testing. Despite these problems, Cierva had received an order from the British Ministry of Supply for three improved Skeeters, a pair of Mark 3s and a single Mark 4, for evaluation purposes by the Royal Air Force (RAF) and Royal Navy. Prior to the completion of any of these three rotorcraft, rival manufacturer Saunders-Roe completed its take over of Cierva's helicopter development contracts and took control of its facilities and development programmes in January 1951. (Note: The takeover by Saunders-Roe had been necessitated after James G. Weir, Cierva's financial backer, decided to withdraw from involvement with helicopter development following the high-profile fatal crash of the Cierva Air Horse during mid-1950.)

During March 1953, the Blackburn Bombardier-engined Skeeter Mark 3B was transferred to the Aeroplane and Armament Experimental Establishment (A&AEE). Subsequent testing showed that these aircraft continued to be underpowered and that the previously encountered ground resonance problems had yet to be properly resolved; these failings were cited as the reason for official support for the rotorcraft being suspended. In response to the suspension, Saunders-Roe chose to undertake a lengthy series of company-funded tests, which involved the use of a specially built rig as well as more theoretical work being performed, for the purpose of identifying both the causes of and solutions to the resonance issue.

=== Competition and reversal of fate ===
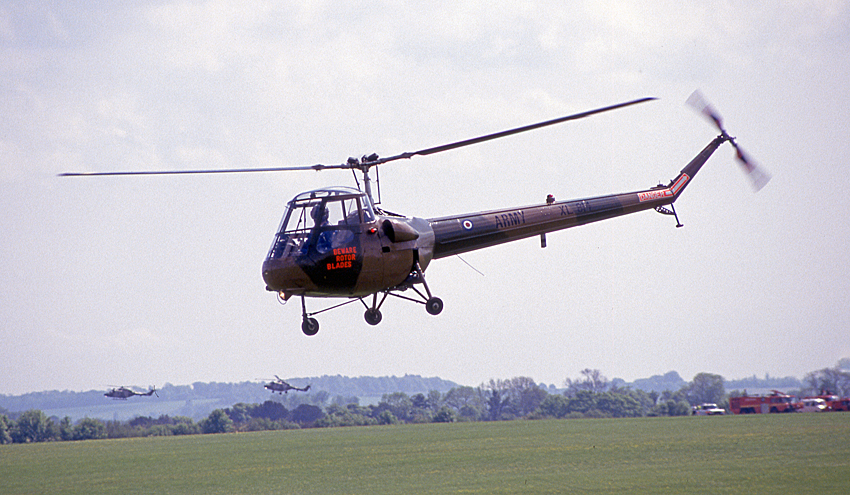
Saunders-Roe Skeeter AOP12 XL 814 at Middle Wallop, 1994

During the early 1950s, the British Army became highly interested in the potential use of compact helicopters in the observation and aerial observation roles. In 1953, there was a requirement issued by the British Ministry of Supply which sought for a low-cost two-seat helicopter, which would be suitable for reconnaissance, casualty evacuation and training duties. This specification was considered to be quite demanding, calling for it to be capable of high speeds and quick climb rates even under tropical conditions. The rotorcraft was also required to be transportable on the back of a standard Army three-ton truck, constricting the dimensions of the prospective vehicle considerably. Further requirements for the prospective light helicopter included a flight endurance of one hour along with the potential for carrying light cargos such as fuel and tools as well as stretcher-bound wounded troops. An initial request for a rear-facing observer's seat was present early on, but was discarded in later revisions. At this time, newly developed gas turbines were beginning to appeal both to helicopter designers and to prospective operators, the British Army made the use of such an engine one of its requirements.

A diverse range of entries were submitted in response to the issuing of the requirement; amongst these were Fairey Aviation with its Ultra-light Helicopter which harnessed tip jet propulsion, Saunders-Roe with a smaller version of the Skeeter, the Bristol Aeroplane Company's proposed Type 190, a ducted rotor proposal by Percival Aircraft, Short Brothers proposed the larger Short SB.8, and a ram jet-powered proposal by Austrian-born helicopter pioneer Raoul Hafner. In response to the detailed design submission that Fairey had produced for their proposal, the Ministry decided to award the firm a contract to produce a total of four development aircraft for demonstration and flight testing purposes; the company later decided to construct a further two more rotorcraft as a private venture.

Meanwhile, a solution for the Skeeter's troublesome resonance issue had been developed, which involved the adoption of a redesigned undercarriage and the fitting of revised blade friction dampers on the rotor head. These improvements allowed Saunders-Roe to finally demonstrate that the ground resonance problems had been fixed when the Skeeter Mark 5 underwent testing by the A&AEE in March 1954. The resolution of the issue served to reignite official interest in the rotorcraft, quickly leading to a smaller order being placed for four Skeeter Mark 6s, each equipped with 200 hp (149 kW) Gipsy Major 200 engines (designated as AOP.10 and T.11 by the British armed forces), for evaluation purposes.

It was around this point that the British Army became more focused on the Skeeter and the addressing of its shortcomings, while the Fairey Ultra-light fell out of favour. According to aviation author Derek Wood, the Skeeter had benefitted from a favourable early impression of the type that had been made upon some West German officials; the rotorcraft had attracted the offer of a sizable military order from the German government, however, the placing of the order was on the condition that the Skeeter was in turn adopted by the British armed forces as well. Thus, the decision was taken in Whitehall to concentrate its efforts on the Skeeter, which effectively meant the abandonment of the Ministry requirement that the rival Fairey Ultra-light had been being developed towards fulfilling. In 1956, Saunders-Roe finally received production orders for 64 AOP.12s, each powered by a 215 hp (160 kW) engine; production deliveries of the Skeeter commenced in 1958.

=== Production ===
Overall 78 Skeeters were produced, in addition to 10 prototypes.

== Design ==
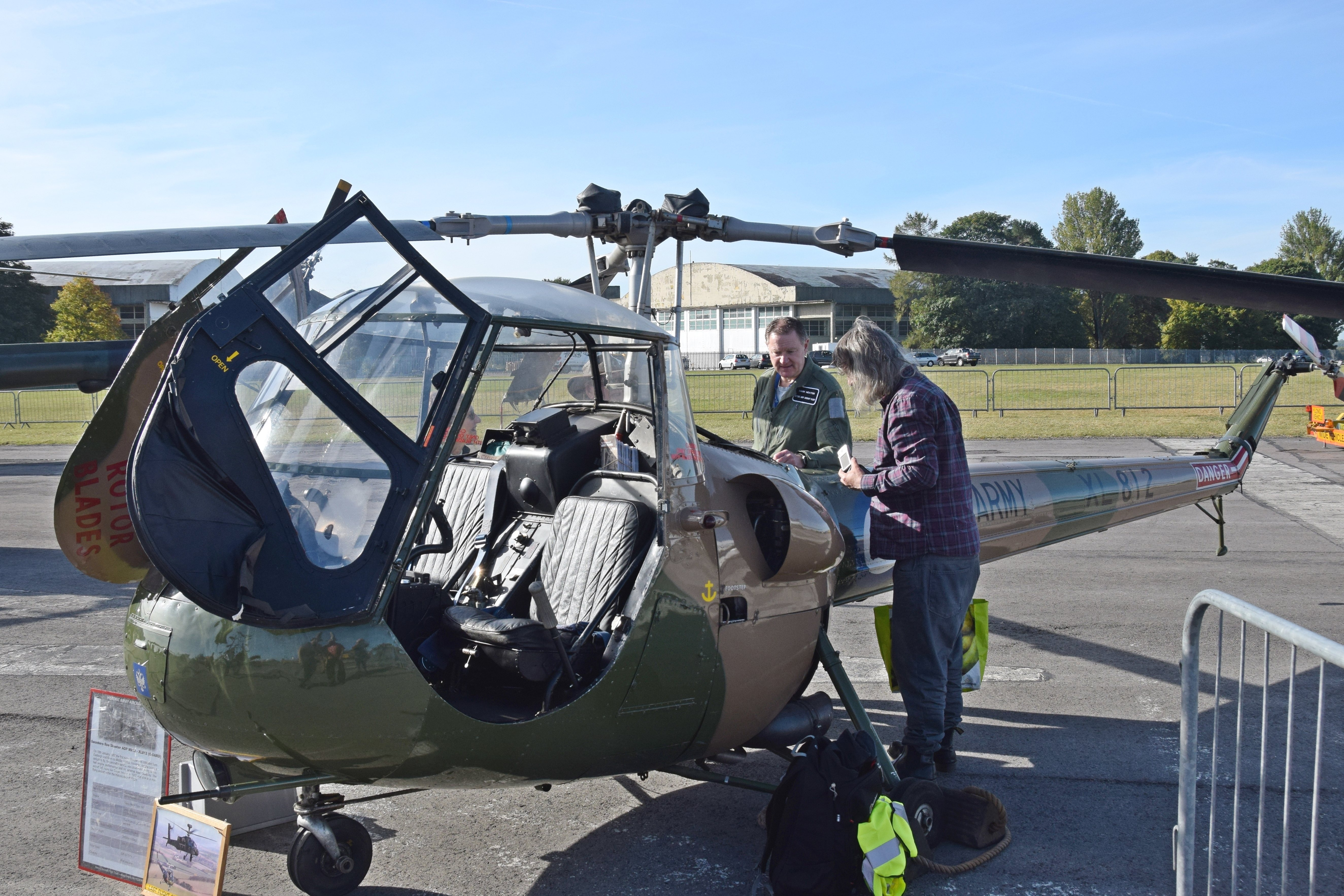
Doors open (preserved example, 2018)

The Saunders-Roe Skeeter is a light all-metal, two-seat single-rotor helicopter, complete with a tail rotor for torque compensation and yaw control. It was intended to perform as an all-purpose rotorcraft, primarily being used for light civil work as well as aerial observation and training missions in military service. The handling characteristics were broadly similar to comparably sized rotorcraft of the era, while possessing the necessary simplicity, robustness, and reliability that commonly typified trainer aircraft.

The Skeeter possessed a relatively conventional configuration for a helicopter, being powered by a single piston engine which drove a 29-foot (8.84 metre) three-bladed main rotor and a three-bladed anti-torque rotor, which was mounted at the end of a triangular-section tailboom. The main rotor-blades made use of a composite construction, using a steel-tube spar that was bonded to wooden veneers, formers, and ribs, as well as brass balance-weights; these reportedly delivered a cost-effective and relatively simplistic rotor blade that also possessed favourable fatigue properties. Saunders-Roe also developed a replacement metal light alloy rotor blade that possessed superior aerodynamic properties and provided increased performance. A fixed tricycle undercarriage arrangement, complete with interchangeable wheels and brake units, was also present.

The Skeeter's crew of two were housed within an enclosed glazed perspex canopy, complete with removable doors. The design of the cabin had been heavily shaped by the requirement for the Skeeter to be suited to the air observation post (AOP) role that the type had been heavily marketed towards. The nose structure of the Skeeter bore the weight of the rotorcraft's equipment, payload, and crew in addition to the inertial forces present during manoeuvring and landing loads from the nose wheel. The light-alloy structure contained control access panels in the floor and a battery unit within the nose itself.

Directly behind the cockpit and underneath the main rotor was the rotorcraft's engine and its nylon bag-type fuel tank, which was housed within a welded tubular steel framework attached to the cockpit structure and to the tailboom. Power was directed to the tail rotor via a torque shaft contained within the tail cone, which featured gearing so that pilots could readily adjust the speed and direction of tail rotor movement. The engine was provided with cooling air via an intake on the centre of the starboard side of the rotorcraft; for improved ventilation, the cowling around the engine area could be entirely removed. The de Havilland Gipsy Major that was used to power the majority of Skeeters was credited with being a major contributor to the rotorcraft's relatively high fuel efficiency due to its use of fuel injectors (the high aerodynamic efficiency of the airframe itself was another beneficial factor).

=== Rocket-boosted rotor ===
With the limited power of the Gipsy Major, means of boosting power were investigated, including a de Havilland developed turbo-supercharger. As an alternative to the turbocharger, a rocket powered rotor boost system was developed by D. Napier & Son, fuelled by High Test Peroxide (HTP) decomposed at blade tip nozzles by contact with a catalyst. The Napier N.R.E. 19 system was fitted to two Skeeter 6 helicopters (G-AMTZ and G-ANMI), re-designated as Skeeter 6 (mod) when modified.

The rocket system consisted of a hemispherical HTP tank on the top of the rotor head and pipes running through the blades to catalyst chambers and rocket nozzles at each blade tip. Total thrust was 22.5 lbf (0.10 kN) thrust for 15 minutes, at a total HTP consumption rate of 1 imp gal/min (1.2 US gal/min; 4.5 L/min), boosting rotor power by 67 shp (50 kW) and increasing vertical climb rate considerably. Total weight of the system was under 30 lb (14 kg).

Flight trials proved the system to work as advertised but it was rejected due to the logistical problems involved with HTP in peace-time and particularly during military action.

== Operational history ==
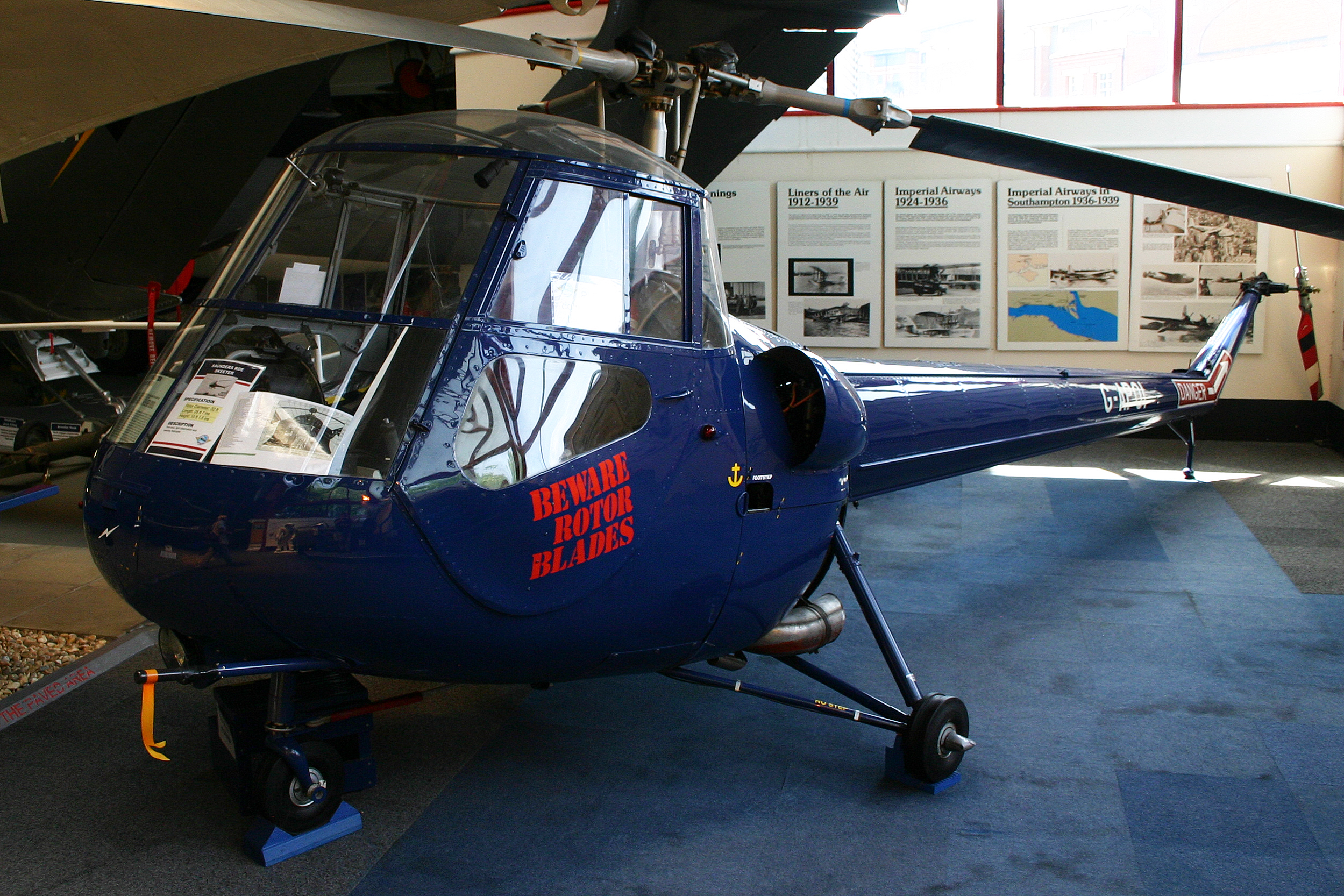
Civilian service example in a museum, G-APOI

The British Army ordered 64 Skeeter 6's, to be designated as the Skeeter AOP.12 (air observation post - artillery direction & control), and the Skeeter finally entered service in October 1956. Several Skeeter AOP.12s were operated by the Central Flying School of the Royal Air Force. With the merger of the helicopter activities of the British Bristol Aeroplane Company, Fairey and Saro with Westland Aircraft in 1960, plans to develop a turbine powered version were abandoned – although this knowledge was used in the development of the Westland Scout and Westland Wasp through to the P.531, which had been based on the Skeeter's airframe.

== Variants ==
Cierva W.14 Skeeter 1
Original design, first flown on 8 October 1948, powered by a 106 hp (79 kW) Jameson FF-1 engine. It had a triangular cross-section to its tail-boom. Only one was built.
Cierva W.14 Skeeter 2
First flew in 1949. Powered by 145 hp (108 kW) Gipsy engine. Suffered badly from ground resonance and eventually shook itself apart. This version had a circular-section tail-boom, as did all future versions. Only one was built.
Skeeter 3
Also with de Havilland Gipsy engine. Mark 3B powered by 180 hp (130 kW) Blackburn Cirrus Bombardier engine.
Two were produced. No orders were placed by the British Army.
Skeeter 4
Version for the Royal Navy, was rejected. Similar to Skeeter 2 and 3. Only one was produced. Built at same time as Mark 3B.
Skeeter 5
Similar to other earlier Skeeters. Only one was produced.
Skeeter 6
Three prototypes were procured. One was the Mark 5 rebuilt with the Gipsy Major 201 fuel-injection engine for gaining Certificate of Airworthiness.
Skeeter 6 (mod)
Two Skeeter 6 helicopters, (G-AMTZ and G-ANMI), modified with a High Test Peroxide fuelled Napier N.R.E. 19 rocket rotor boost system.

Skeeter AOP.10

Three preproduction evaluation aircraft built for the British Army

Skeeter T.11

One dual-control trainer was built for the Royal Air Force
Skeeter 7
Had 215 hp (160 kW) Gipsy Major 150 engine. This was the most successful Skeeter. 64 were built and acquired by the British Army Air Corps.

Skeeter AOP.12

Air observation post helicopter for the British Army Air Corps and training helicopter for the Royal Air Force.

Skeeter T.13

Training version for the RAF. The Skeeter T.13s were used to train army helicopter instructors.
Skeeter 8
Commercial version similar to Skeeter 7, with 215 hp (160 kW) Gipsy Major. Only single example completed, with two more abandoned incomplete.
Skeeter Mk.50
Export version of the Skeeter 7 for the German Army Aviation Corps. Six were ordered and exported.
Skeeter Mk.51
Export version of the Skeeter 7 for the German Navy. Four were ordered and exported.

== Operators ==
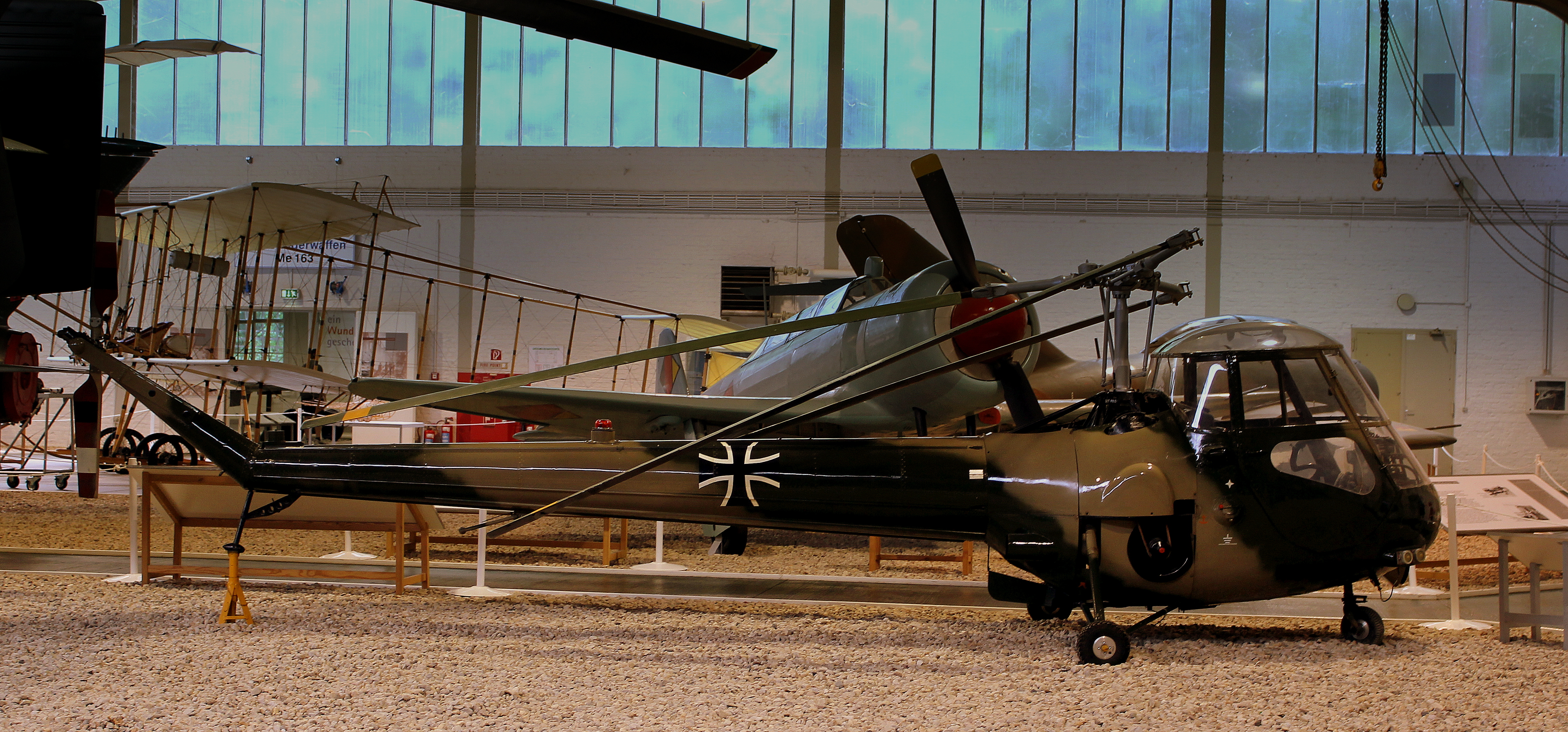
Skeeter in German markings at a museum

Germany

- German Army
- German Navy

United Kingdom

- Army Air Corps
- Royal Air Force

Portugal

- Portuguese Air Force
  Six Skeeter Mk.50 and four Skeeter Mk.51 acquired from the German Army Aviation Corps and German Navy, respectively. These non-airworthy examples were delivered in July 1961 and were stored at OGMA; due to lacking spare parts their rebuild was eventually cancelled and they were sold.

== Surviving airframes ==
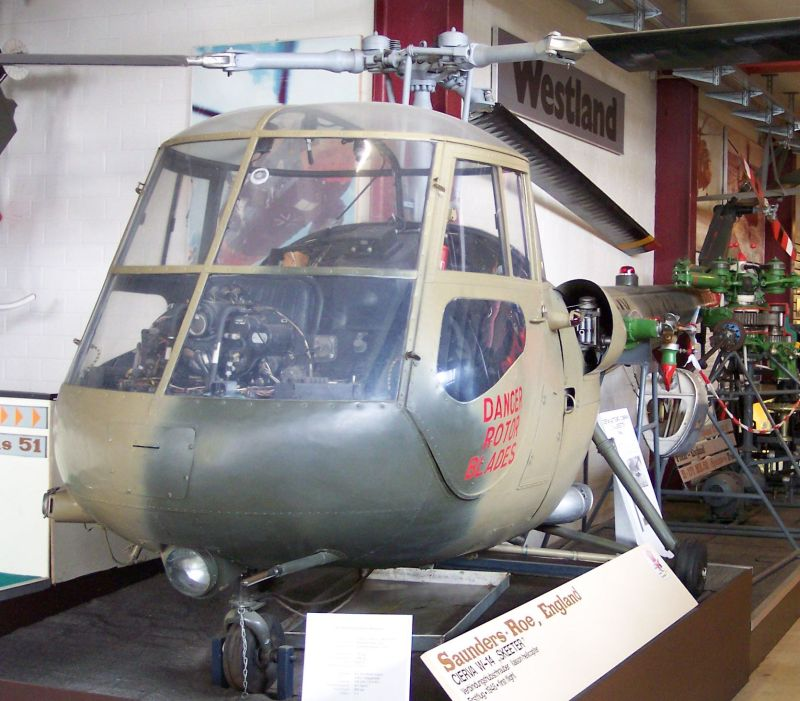
A preserved Skeeter

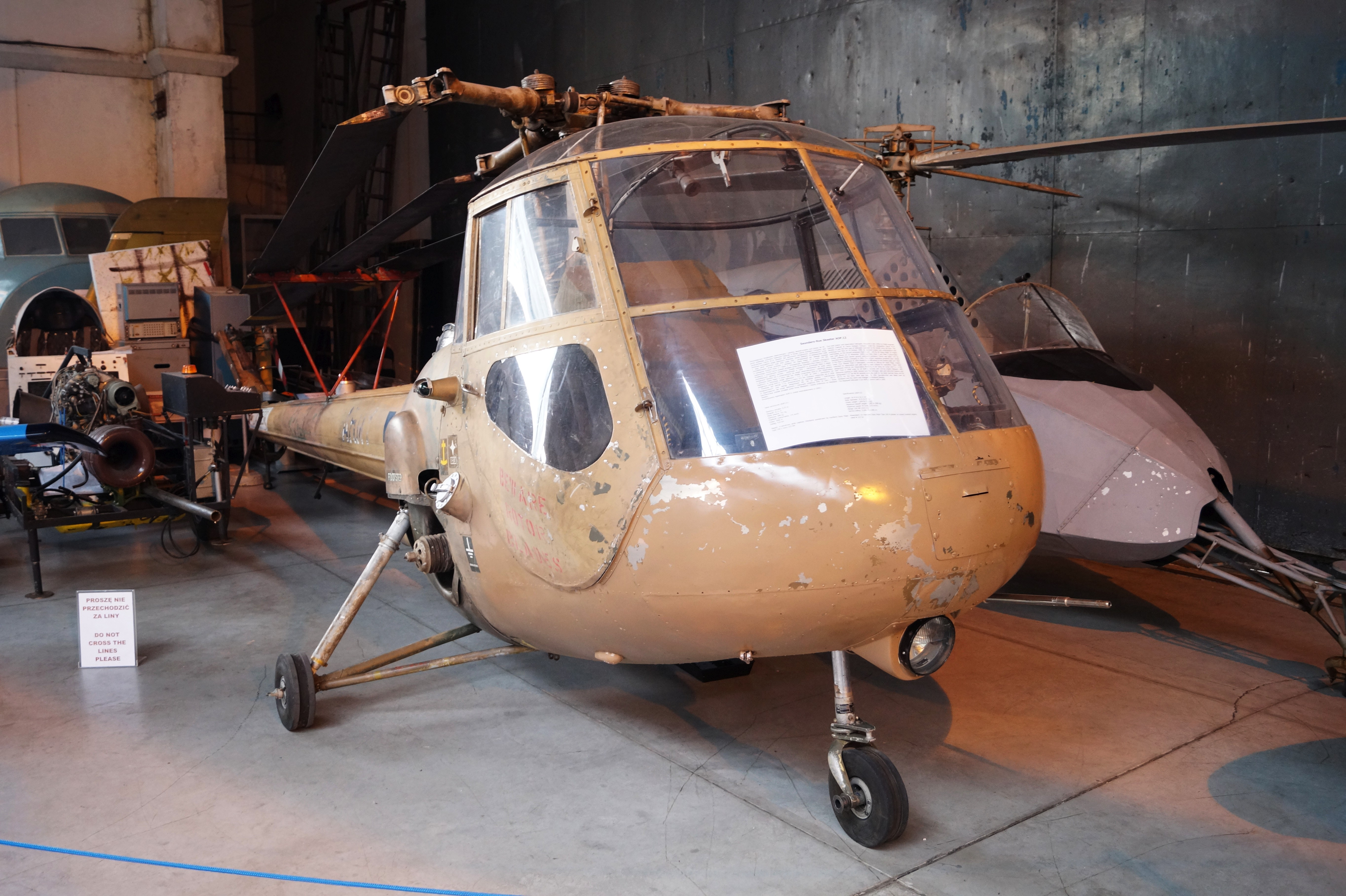
Skeeter on display at the Polish Aviation Museum

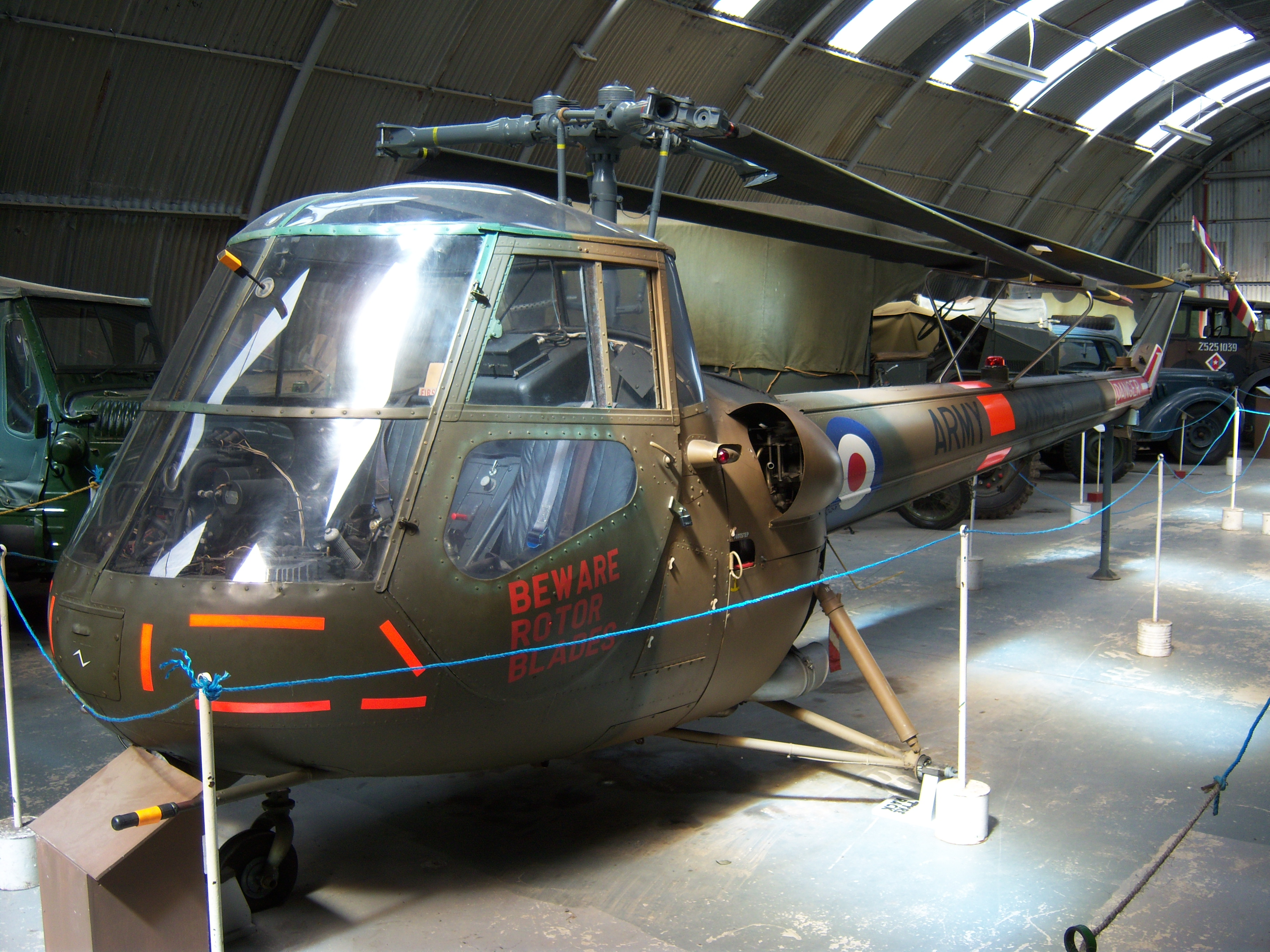
Skeeter at the North East Land, Sea and Air Museums, U.K, 2015

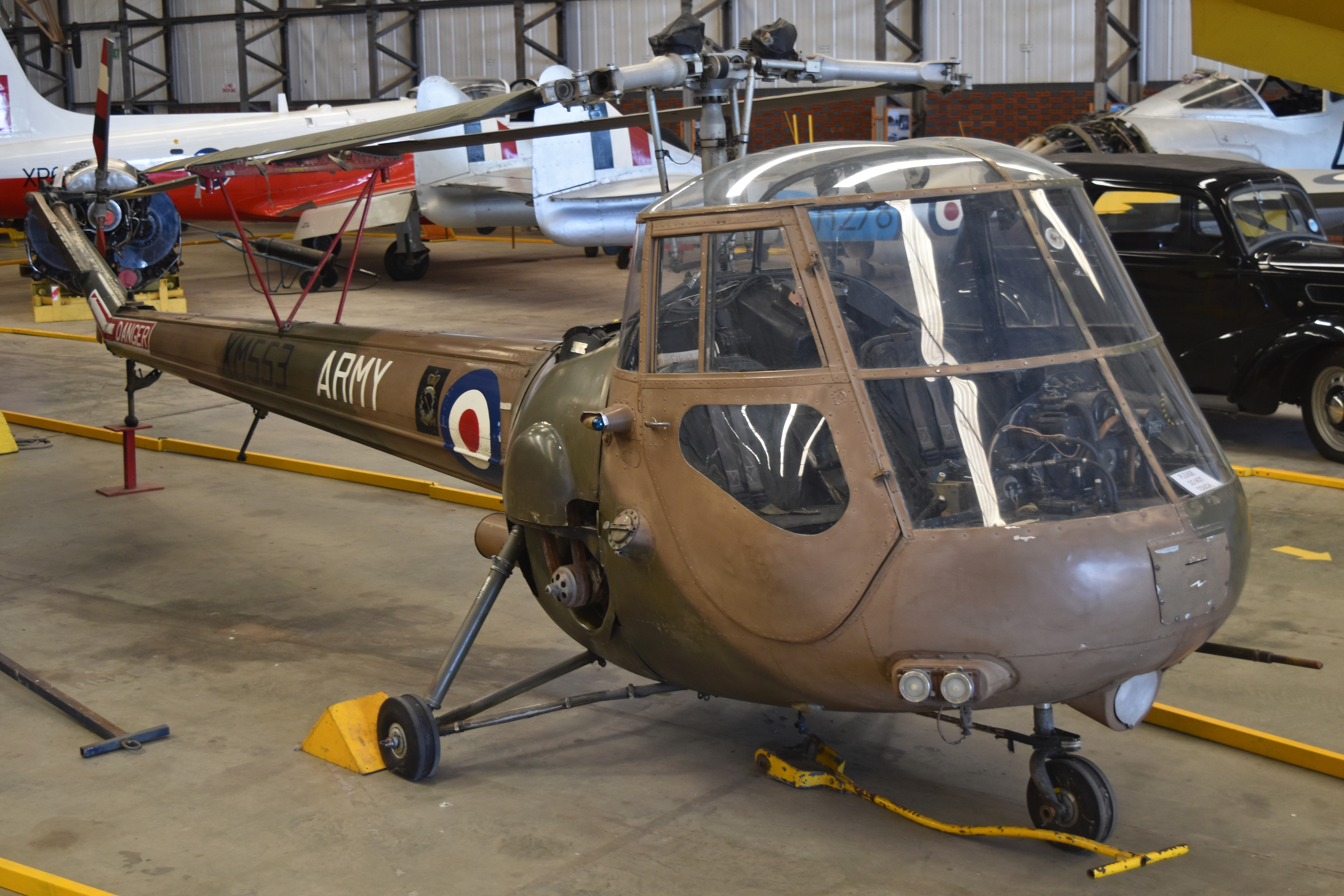
Skeeter at the Yorkshire Air Museum, U.K

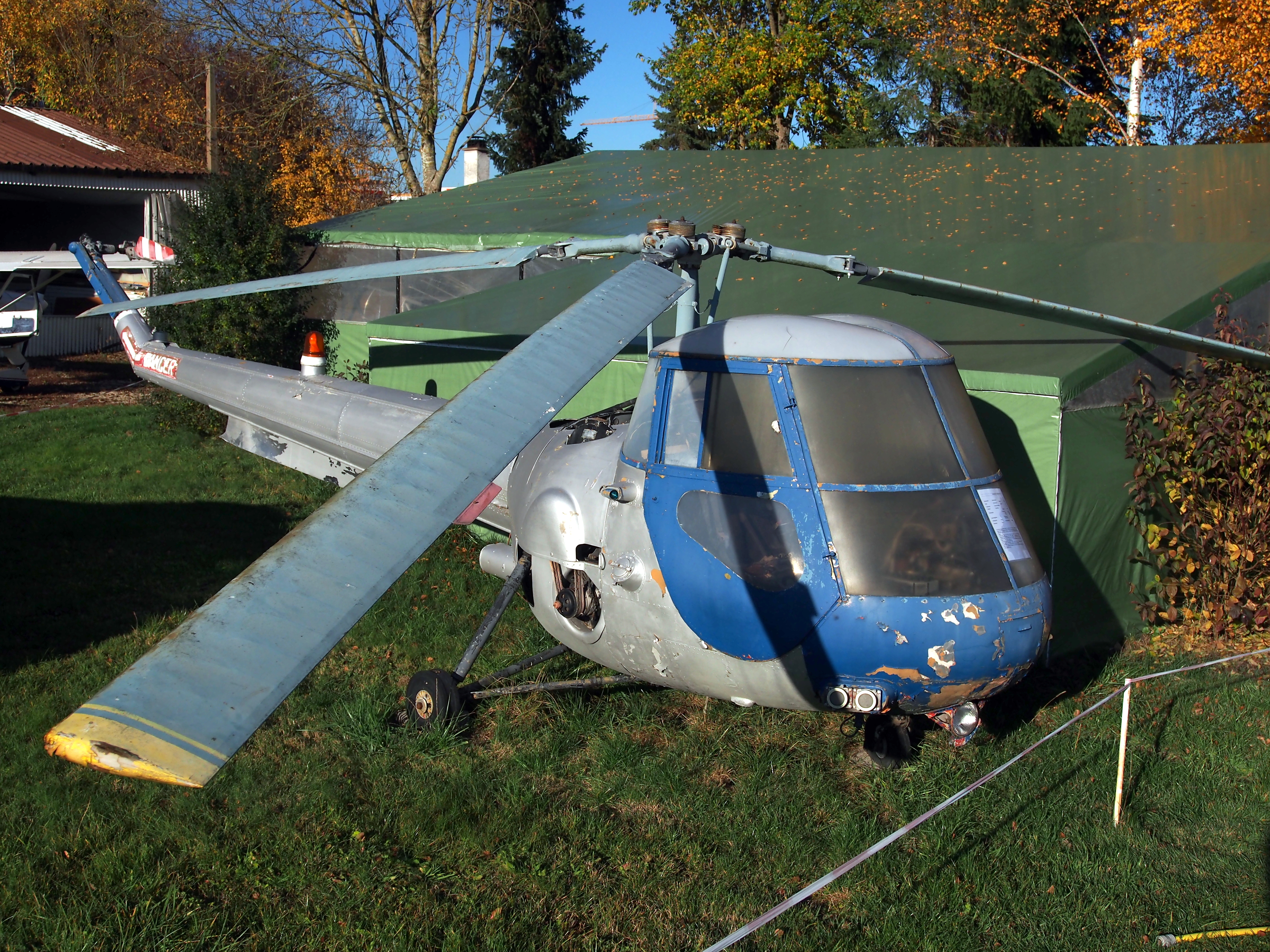
Skeeter AOP.12 at Luftfahrtmuseum Villingen-Schwenningen

Germany

- XN348 – Skeeter AOP.12 on static display at the Hubschraubermuseum Bückeburg in Bückeburg, Lower Saxony.

Poland

- XL767 – Skeeter AOP.12 on static display at the Polish Aviation Museum in Kraków, Lesser Poland.

United Kingdom

- XL739 – Skeeter AOP.12 on static display at the Norfolk Tank Museum in Forncett, Norfolk.
- XL762 – Skeeter AOP.12 in storage at the National Museum of Flight in East Fortune, East Lothian.
- XL764 – Skeeter AOP.12 on static display at Newark Air Museum in Newark-on-Trent, Nottinghamshire.
- XL765 - Skeeter AOP.12 on static display at the Wight Aviation Museum, Sandown Airport, Sandown, IOW.
- XL770 – Skeeter AOP.12 on static display at the Solent Sky Museum in Southampton, Hampshire.
- XL811 – Skeeter AOP.12 on static display at The Helicopter Museum in Weston-super-Mare, North Somerset.
- XL813 – Skeeter AOP.12 on static display at the Army Flying Museum in Middle Wallop, Hampshire.
- XM553 – Skeeter AOP.12 on static display at the Yorkshire Air Museum in Elvington, York.
- XM555 – Skeeter AOP.12 on static display at the North East Land, Sea and Air Museums in Sunderland, Tyne and Wear.
- XN344 – Skeeter AOP.12 on static display at the Science Museum, London in London.
- XN351 - Skeeter AOP.12 on static display at Morayvia, Kinloss, Scotland.
- S2/5081 – Skeeter 8 on static display at the Solent Sky Museum in Southampton, Hampshire.

== Specifications (Skeeter AOP.12) ==
Data from Saunders and Saro Aircraft since 1917.

General characteristics

- Crew: Two
- Length: 26 ft 8 in (8.13 m)
- Height: 9 ft 6 in (2.90 m)
- Empty weight: 1,656 lb (751 kg)
- Gross weight: 2,200 lb (998 kg)
- Max takeoff weight: 2,300 lb (1,043 kg)
- Powerplant: 1 × de Havilland Gipsy Major 215 4-cylinder air-cooled inverted engine, 215 hp (160 kW)
- Main rotor diameter: 32 ft 0 in (9.75 m)
- Main rotor area: 804 sq ft (74.7 m^{2})

Performance

- Maximum speed: 109 mph (175 km/h, 95 kn)
- Cruise speed: 106 mph (171 km/h, 92 kn)
- Range: 260 mi (420 km, 230 nmi) at 86 mph (75 kn; 138 km/h)
- Endurance: 3 hr
- Service ceiling: 12,800 ft (3,900 m)
- Rate of climb: 1,150 ft/min (5.8 m/s)
- Hover ceiling: 5,500 ft (1,700 m) (in ground effect)
- Vertical climb rate: 425 ft/min (2.16 m/s)

== See also ==
- Saro P.531

Related lists

- List of rotorcraft
