= Sud-Ouest Ariel =

Ariel
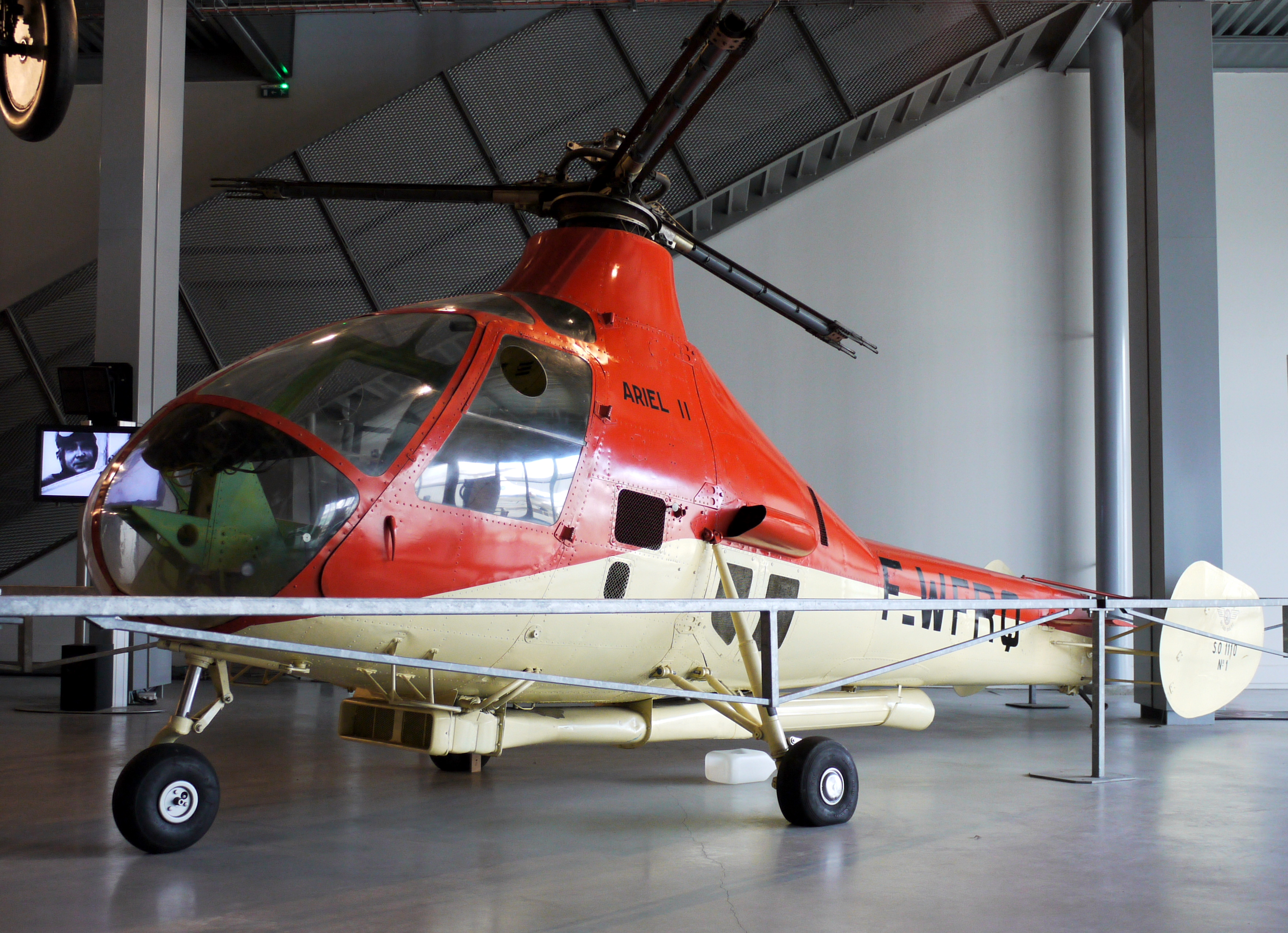

General information
- Type: Experimental light helicopter
- National origin: France
- Manufacturer: Sud-Ouest

History
- First flight: 1947

The Sud-Ouest Ariel is a French two-seat light helicopter designed and built by Sud-Ouest. The helicopter rotors were driven by compressed-air jets at the end of each blade.

== Design and development ==
The S.O.1100 Ariel I was first flown in 1947, it was a light all-metal helicopter with an enclosed two-seat cabin. Power was provided by a Mathis G8 engine which drove a Turbomeca compressor. The low-pressure air output from the compressor was ducted to each of the three rotor blades to the ends of each blade. At the tip of each blade was a combustion chamber where the air was mixed with fuel and ignited. The Ariel had a short tail boom with twin vertical tail surfaces. On 23 March 1949. an improved S.O.1110 Ariel II was flown, it was a similar configuration to the Ariel I was had revised tail surfaces.

The final variant was the S.O.1120 Ariel III which had a combined Turbomeca Arrius turbine-compressor rather than the two units of the earlier aircraft. With the space made from the power changes an extra seat was fitted. Another difference was the tail unit, the Ariel II had a single fin and rudder and used jet efflux from the turbine to provide directional control, a directional vane linked to the rudder directed the efflux.

== Operational history ==
The Ariel was not put into production but the knowledge gained was used in the development of the Sud-Ouest Djinn.

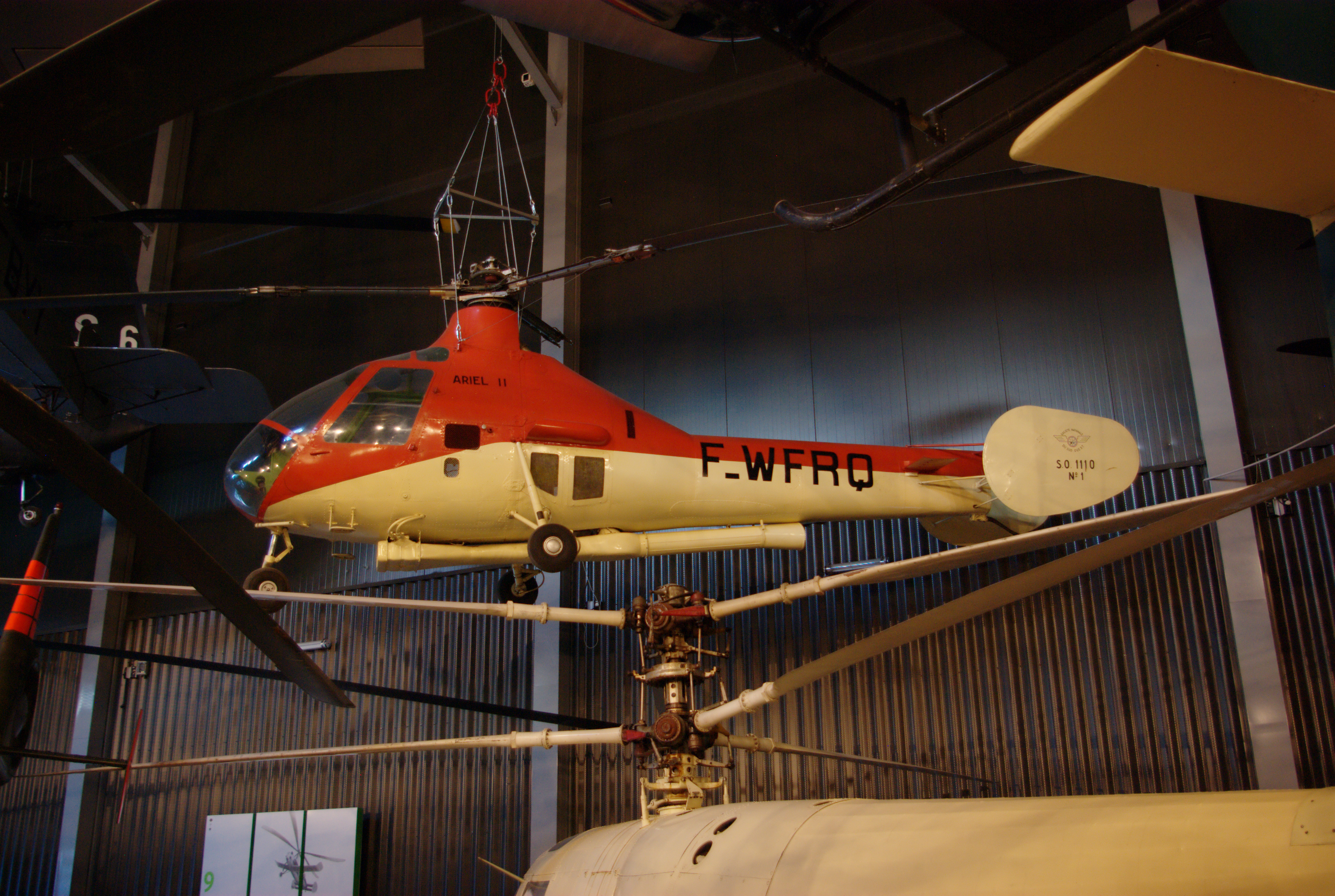

== Variants ==
S.O.1100 Ariel I
Two-seat experimental tip-jet helicopter with a piston engine-powered compressor.
S.O.1110 Ariel II
Improved variant with revised tail surfaces.
S.O.1120 Ariel III
Improved three-seat variant with a combined turbine-compressor.

== Specifications (Ariel II) ==
Data from The Illustrated Encyclopedia of Aircraft

General characteristics

- Crew: Two
- Length: 7.15 m (23 ft 5 in)
- Empty weight: 725 kg (1,598 lb)
- Gross weight: 1,080 kg (2,380 lb)
- Powerplant: 1 × Mathis G8 piston engine driving a compressor , 220 kW (164 hp)
- Main rotor diameter: 10.80 m (35 ft 5.25 in)

Performance

- Maximum speed: 170 km/h (105 mph, 91 kn)
- Range: 300 km (186 mi, 162 nmi)

== See also ==
Related development

- Sud-Ouest Djinn

Aircraft of comparable role, configuration, and era

- Fairey Ultra-light Helicopter
- Percival P.74
