= Fiat 4700 =

1960s Italian gas generator aircraft engine

4700
- National origin: Italy
- Manufacturer: Fiat Aviazione
- First run: 1960
- Major applications: Fiat 7002
- Developed from: Fiat 4002

The Fiat 4700 was an Italian turbo-generator developed by Fiat Aviazione under contract to the Italian Defence Ministry and used to power the experimental Fiat 7002 tip jet helicopter.

== Design and development ==
The Fiat 4700 was developed to provide power in cold-jet driven helicopters. The 4700 was a turbo-driven air compressor driven by the primary engine, a turbojet engine based on the Fiat 4002. The compressor and primary engine are mechanically independent. The engine is mounted vertically to reduce the length of the compressed-air ducts to the rotor. The engine was used on the Fiat 7002 helicopter which first flew on 26 January 1961 where the Fiat 4700 was used to power the cold tip-jets on the two-blade rotor.

== Applications ==
- Fiat 7002

== Specification ==
Data from Jane's All the World's Aircraft 1962-63.

==== General characteristics ====
- Type: Gas generator
- Length: 1,300 mm (51.2 in) (height)
- Diameter: 612 mm (24.1 in)
- Dry weight: 152 kg (335 lb)

==== Components ====
- Compressor: Single-sided centrifugal flow plus gas generator single-sided centrifugal flow compressor driven by the free power turbine
- Combustors: Annular with 16 burners
- Turbine: 1-stage axial flow (gas turbine power) + 1-stage axial flow free power turbine (gas generator power)
- Fuel type: Aviation kerosene
- Oil system: Re-circulating pressure system with one pressure pump and three scavenge pumps

==== Performance ====
- Maximum power output: 450 kW (610 hp) (gas hp for take-off), 377 kW (505 hp) (ghp max continuous)
- Overall pressure ratio: 4:1
- Air mass flow: 5.1 kg/s (11.2 lb/s) at 25,000 rpm at sea level, 3.34 kg/s (7.36 lb/s) (max continuous)
- Specific fuel consumption: 0.758 kg/kWh (1.246 lb/(hp⋅h))
- Power-to-weight ratio: 2.99 kW/kg (1.82 hp/lb)

== See also ==
Comparable engines

- Napier Oryx
- Turbomeca Palouste

Related lists

- List of aircraft engines
