= The Helicopter Museum =

Museum in Somerset, United Kingdom

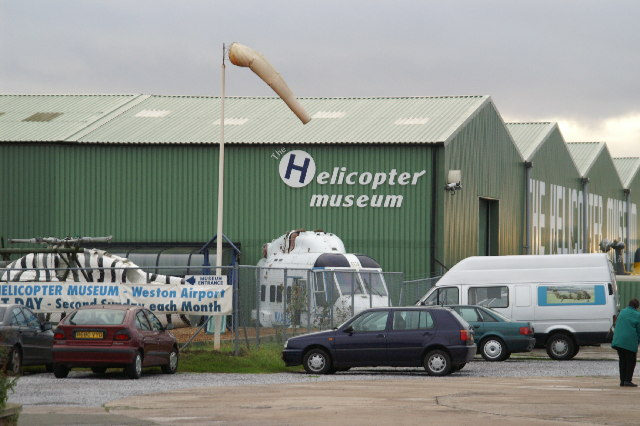

- Location within Somerset and the United Kingdom
- Established: 3 November 1989; 36 years ago
- Location: Weston-super-Mare, England
- Coordinates: 51.3393°N 2.9310°W
- Director: Lee Mills
- Website: helimuseum.com

The Helicopter Museum in Weston-super-Mare, North Somerset, England, is a museum featuring a collection of more than 80 helicopters and autogyros from around the world, both civilian and military. It is based at the southeastern corner of the former Weston-super-Mare RAF Base.

== History ==
The museum originated in 1958 when its founder, aviation writer and historian Elfan ap Rees, began to build up a private collection of rotorcraft documentation and artefacts. Over the next ten years his collection grew and in 1969 he acquired his first complete helicopter, a Bristol Sycamore Mk.3.

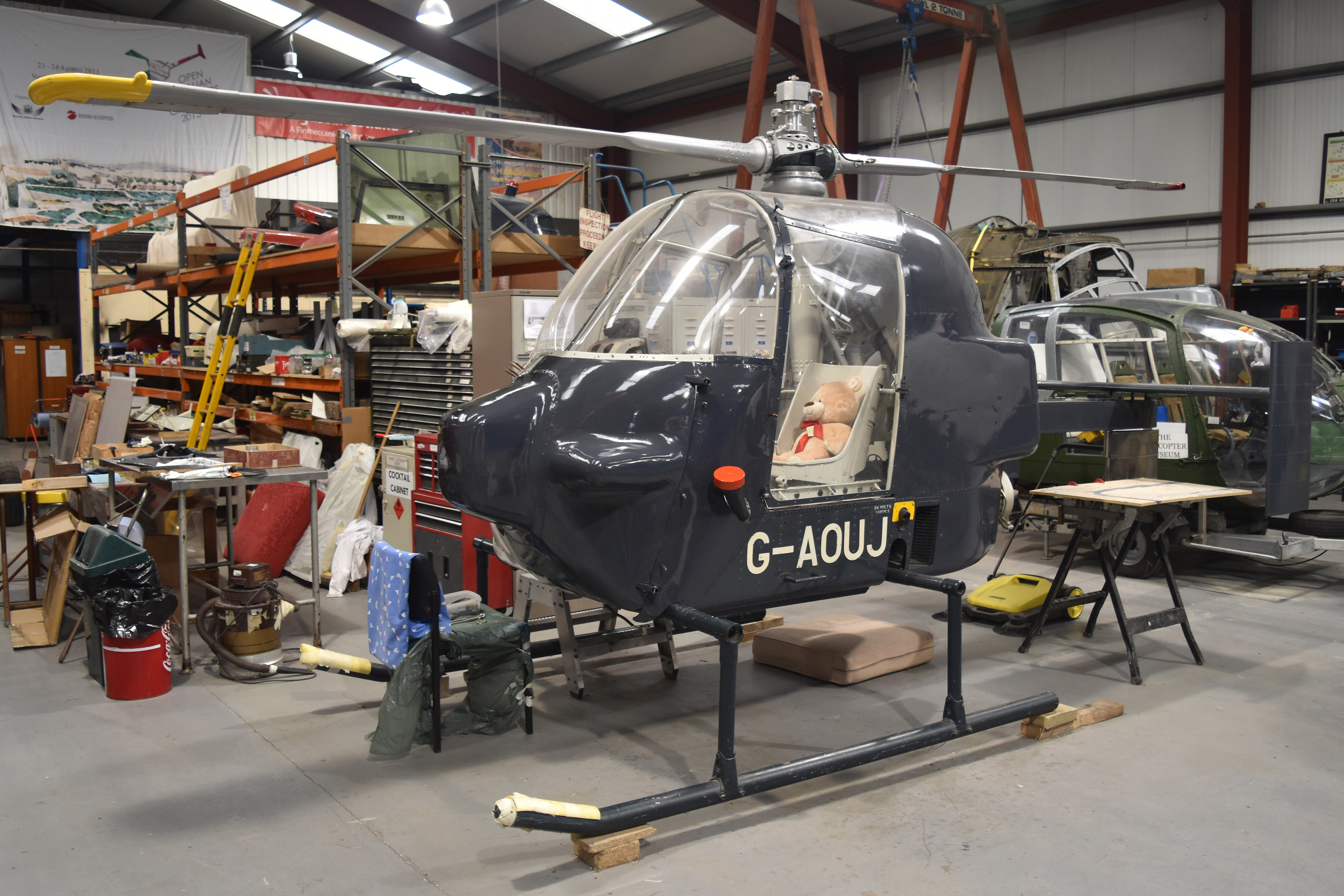
Fairey Ultra-Light

In 1974, ap Rees purchased a Bristol Belvedere and formed a volunteer group to restore it. In December 1976, an ex Royal Navy Westland Whirlwind HAS Mk.7 was acquired and added to the collection. In 1977 and 1978, more aircraft were added, including an ex Royal Air Force Bristol Sycamore HC Mk.14 and several rare prototypes: the Fairey Ultra-Light tip-jet driven helicopter, the Thruxton Gadfly HDW.1 two-seat autogyro and the Campbell Cougar autogyro.

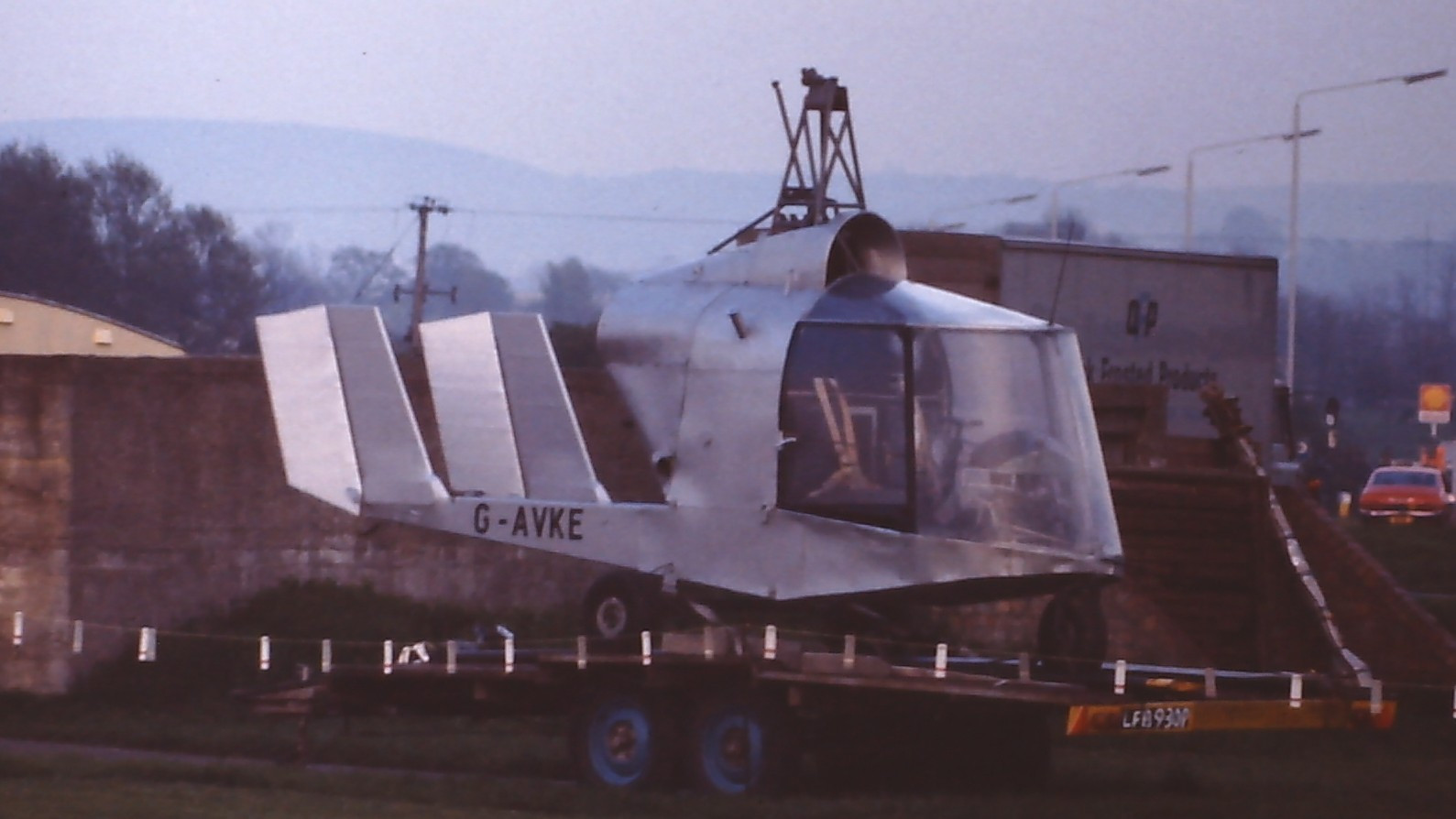
Thruxton Gadfly at the site in 1979

In 1978, the museum acquired a small area and some buildings on Weston-super-Mare airfield, including a Second World War armoury building and air-raid shelter. The buildings required extensive repair work, but by the summer of 1978 the collection was opened to the public, with nine aircraft and a range of other artefacts on display. The museum was forced to close at the end of the 1979 season, but throughout the 1980s, remains from rare helicopters were added to the collection, often preventing them from being scrapped, including the only remaining major parts of the Fairey Rotodyne. Other aircraft acquired in the 1980s included two more variants of the Westland Whirlwind, a Westland Scout AH Mk.1 and a Westland Wessex.

The museum reopened on a new airfield site in 1988 and volunteers spent the next year restoring old buildings and erecting a new display annexe. On 3 November 1989, the museum was officially opened by Prince Andrew, Duke of York, who arrived in a Wessex HC.4 of the Queen's Flight. Since then the museum has grown, erecting new hangarage to put the collection under cover and purchasing its 4.5-acre (1.8 ha) site outright, with the help of the Heritage Lottery Fund and other grants.

Throughout its development, the trustees have sourced and acquired many rare aircraft for the collection. By 2012, around 45 helicopters and autogyros in the museum qualified for the highest benchmark status in the National Aviation Heritage Register, including a number of sole prototypes and others that were the only examples in the country. The museum continues to restore and display many types of helicopters from various countries and purposes.

== Collection ==
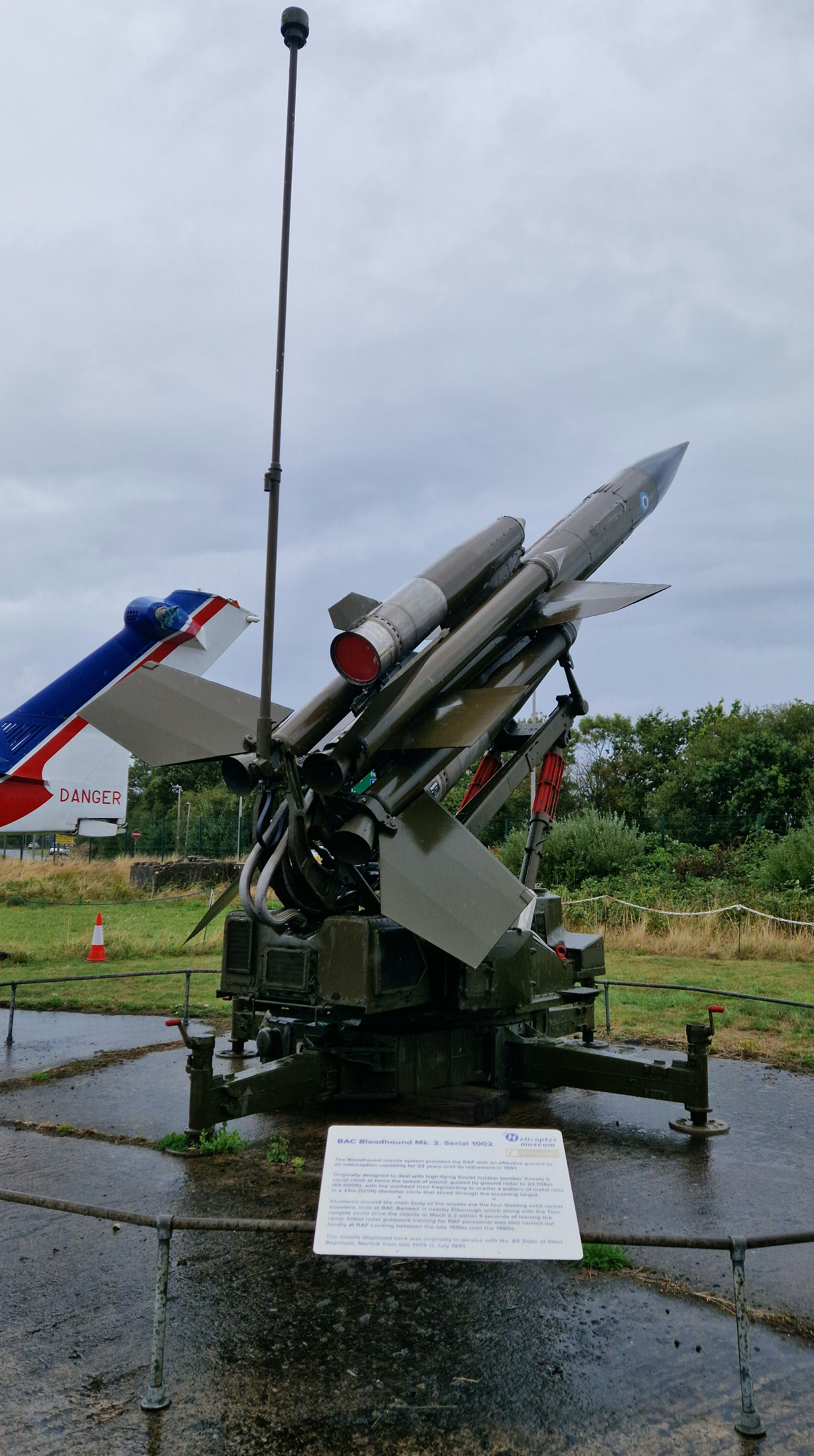
Bloodhound (missile) at The Helicopter Museum.

The museum's collection of helicopters exceeds 80 complete rotorcraft, with others under restoration or only partly complete. The museum features many foreign helicopters, particularly Soviet-era and Eastern European craft, for example the Kamov Ka-26 Hoodlum and the Mi-24 Hind, and more modern ones such as the EH-101.

In 2008, several parts of the Boeing Vertol XCH-62, prototype of the largest helicopter ever built in the western countries, were sent to the Helicopter Museum to be exhibited there. The XCH-62 was scrapped in 2005 at the United States Army Aviation Museum, where it was previously displayed. More recently the museum has added a Mil Mi-8, a former Italian Guardia di Finanza Agusta A109, an Agusta Bell 206C JetRanger, a Gyrodyne QH-50D, a Super Puma and a Piasecki H-21. The museum also holds two record-breakers: Westland Lynx G-LYNX which has held the absolute helicopter world speed record since 1986, and the first production Aerospatiale Dauphin which holds the Paris-London-Paris city centres speed record.

=== Rotorcraft undergoing restoration ===
- Bristol Belvedere HC.1, XG452
- Westland Whirlwind HCC.12, XR486
- Piasecki H-21, FR41

=== Rotorcraft ===
==== British ====
Source.

Westland Lynx G-LYNX

- Parts of Cranfield Vertigo
- Bristol Type 171 Sycamore Mk.3, G-ALSX
- Bristol Type 171 Sycamore HC.14, XL829
- Parts of Fairey Rotodyne, XE521
- Fairey Ultra-Light, G-AOUJ/XJ928
- Westland WS-51 Dragonfly HR.5, WG719
- Westland WS-51A Widgeon Series 2, G-AOZE
- Westland Scout AH.1, XP165
- Westland Wasp HAS.1, XT443
- Westland Lynx, ZB500/G-LYNX
- Westland Lynx 3, ZE477/G-17-24
- Westland Whirlwind HAS Mk.7, XK940
- Westland Whirlwind HAR.10, XD163
- Westland Whirlwind Series 3, G-AODA
- Westland Wessex HAS.1, XM330
- Westland Wessex HAS.3, XM328
- Westland Wessex HCC.4, XV733
- Westland Wessex 60, G-AVNE
- Westland 30 Series 100, G-BGHF
- Westland 30 Series 100, G-BKGD (2nd WG-30 Prototype)
- Westland 30 Series 200, G-ELEC
- Westland 30 Series 300, G-HAUL
- Remote piloted
  - Westland Mote
  - Westland Wisp
  - Westland Wideye
  - Westland Sharpeye

==== European ====
Source.

MBB Bo105M

- Agusta A109A MkII, MM81205
- Agusta-Bell 47G-3B1 Sioux AH.1, XT190
- Bölkow Bo 102 Helitrainer, D-HMQV
- EH Industries EH101 G-EHIL/ZH647
- Eurocopter AS332 Super Puma
- Eurocopter SA365N Dauphin, F-WQAP
- Sud Aviation SA321F Super Frelon, F-BTRP
- MBB Bo105M, 81+00.
- Sud Aviation Alouette SA318C, A-41
- Sud Ouest SO1221 Djinn, 1058/CDL

==== Russian ====
Source.

- Kamov Ka-26 "Hoodlum", D-HOAY
- Mil Mi-1 "Hare", 2007
- Mil Mi-2, SP-SAY
- Mil Mi-4 "Hound", 9147
- Mil Mi-8PS,10618
- Mil Mi-24D "Hind", 96+26/421
- WSK-Swidnik SM-2, 05
Kamov Ka-26 at the museum in 2013. It was formerly registered with Interflug in pre-unification East Germany.

Mil Mi-24

==== American ====
Source.

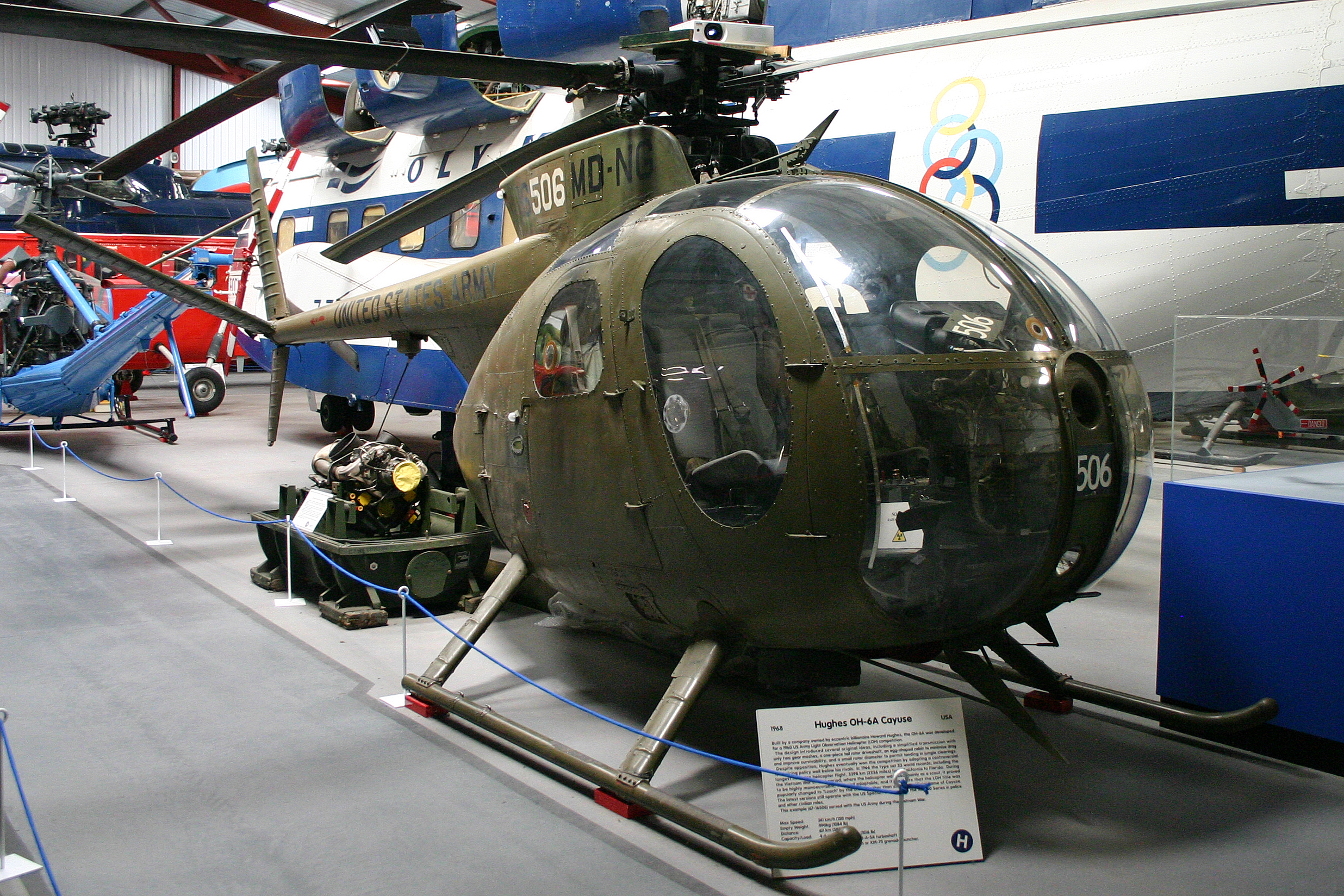
Hughes OH-6A

- Air & Space 18A Autogyro, G-BVWL
- Barnett J4B, G-BWCW
- Bell 47H, G-AZYB
- Bell UH-1H Iroquois, 66-16579
- Bensen B-8M, G-BIGP
- Bensen B-8M Gyro-Boat, BAPC.289
- Brantly B-2B, G-OAPR
- Gyrodyne QH-50 DASH, DS-1482
- Hiller UH-12C, G-ASTP
- Hughes OH-6A Cayuse, 67-16506
- McCulloch J-2, G-ORVB
- Piasecki HUP-3 Retriever, RCN 622
- Robinson R22HP, G-OTED

== Expansion ==
The museum site has expanded to include the former RAF Weston-super-Mare control tower and the attached "pilots' building" reopened in 2018, and cleared an area ready for a new services block.

== See also ==
- American Helicopter Museum, Pennsylvania, United States
- Classic Rotors Museum, California, United States
- Hubschraubermuseum Bückeburg, Germany
- List of aerospace museums
