= Barnett Rotorcraft =

Company based in the state of California, United States

Barnett Rotorcraft is an American aircraft manufacturer established by Jerry Barnett in Olivehurst, California in 1962 to market gyrocopters for homebuilding. The firm's most significant design is the Barnett J4B, available in single- and two-seat versions.
