= Fiat 7002 =

Model 7002

General information
- Type: General-purpose helicopter
- Manufacturer: Fiat Aviazione
- Number built: 1

History
- First flight: 26 January 1961

The Fiat Model 7002 was a 1960s Italian general-purpose helicopter with a tip jet driven rotor built by Fiat Aviazione. Only one aircraft was built.

== Development ==
In the early 1960s, under an Italian government contract, Fiat Aviazione designed the Model 7002, a medium-capacity transport helicopter. It had an unusually-shaped fuselage made from light-alloy sheets to provide accommodation for two crew and up to five passengers. The fuselage was mounted on a skid landing gear and the fuselage had a simple tailboom with a tail rotor. A two-blade main rotor was mounted above the fuselage, with the rotor driven by compressed air propulsion nozzles at the blade-tips. The compressed air was generated by a Fiat 4700 turbo gas generator located in the rear fuselage. The prototype helicopter first flew on 26 January 1961 but no production aircraft were built.

== Specifications ==
Data from Jane's All the World's Aircraft 1958-59

General characteristics

- Crew: 1-2
- Capacity: 5-6
- Length: 6.12 m (20 ft 1 in) (fuselage)
- Width: 1.4 m (4 ft 7 in) (fuselage)
- Height: 2.88 m (9 ft 5 in)
- Empty weight: 600 kg (1,323 lb)
- Gross weight: 1,400 kg (3,086 lb)
- Fuel capacity: 525 L (138.7 US gal; 115.5 imp gal) in fuel tanks above the cabin
- Powerplant: 1 × Fiat 4700 Turbo-compressor, 400 kW (530 hp) gas equivalent power
- Main rotor diameter: 12 m (39 ft 4 in)
- Main rotor area: 113.112 m^{2} (1,217.53 sq ft)

Performance

- Maximum speed: 170 km/h (110 mph, 92 kn) at sea level
- Cruise speed: 135 km/h (84 mph, 73 kn) at sea level
- Range: 300 km (190 mi, 160 nmi)
- Service ceiling: 3,400 m (11,200 ft).

== See also ==
- Tip jet

Aircraft of comparable role, configuration, and era

- Percival P.74
