= Gadfly HDW.1 =

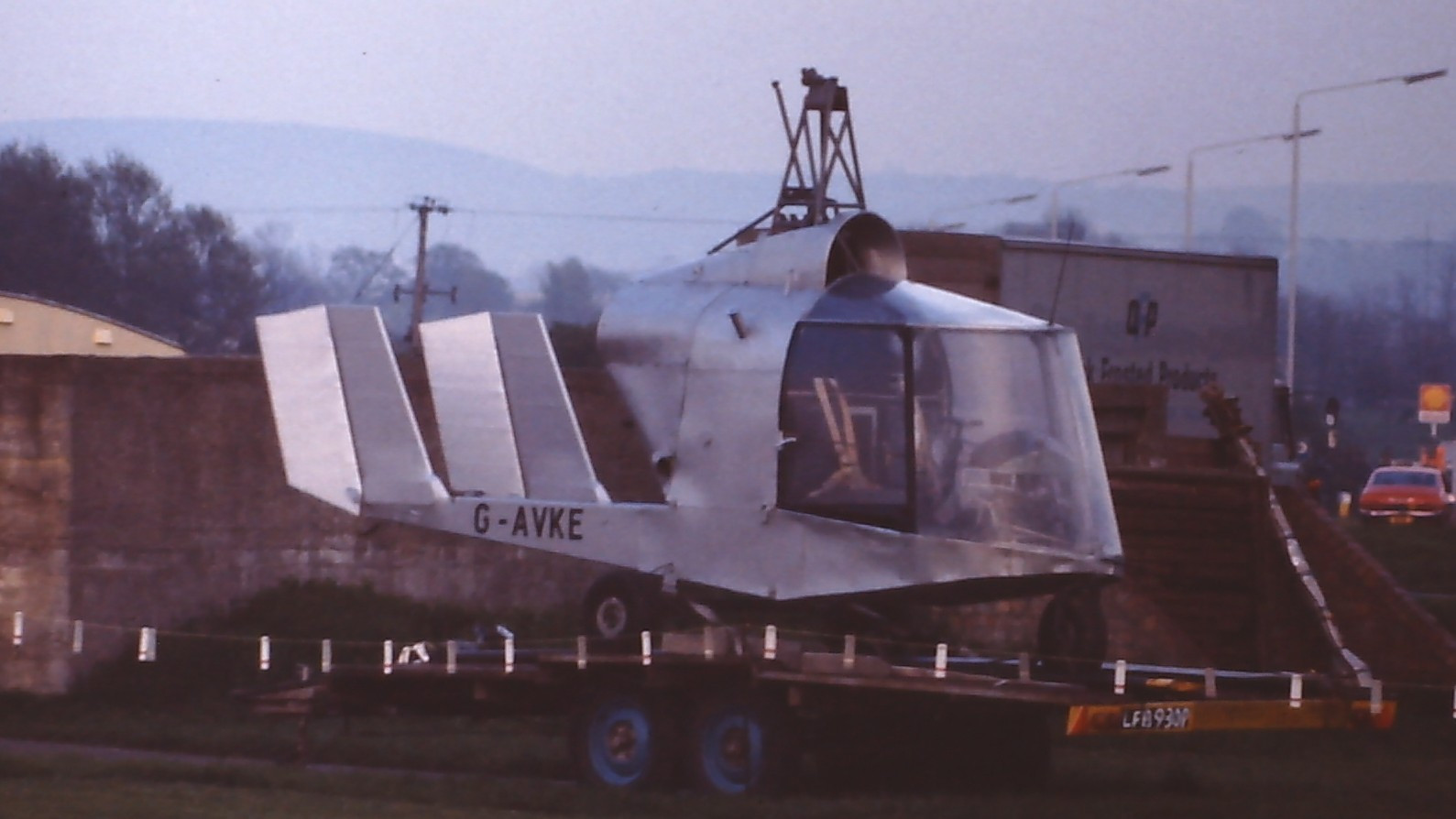

General information
- Type: Autogyro
- National origin: United Kingdom
- Manufacturer: Gadfly Aircraft Company Limited
- Designer: E. Smith
- Status: On Display
- Number built: 1

The Gadfly HDW.1 (also known as the Thruxton Gadfly) is a 1960s British two-seat cabin autogyro.

== Design and construction ==
The autogyro was designed by E. Smith and built by the Gadfly Aircraft Company Limited. It is of welded steel tube construction with tricycle landing gear, powered by a 165 hp (123 kW) Rolls-Royce Continental IO-346-A inline piston engine driving a pusher propeller. It has a two-bladed rotor that can be engine-driven for starting.

It was completed at Andover in 1967 and registered G-AVKE. After retirement the Gadfly was initially exhibited at the Historic Aircraft Museum at Southend Airport. Latterly it has been displayed at The Helicopter Museum, Weston-super-Mare.

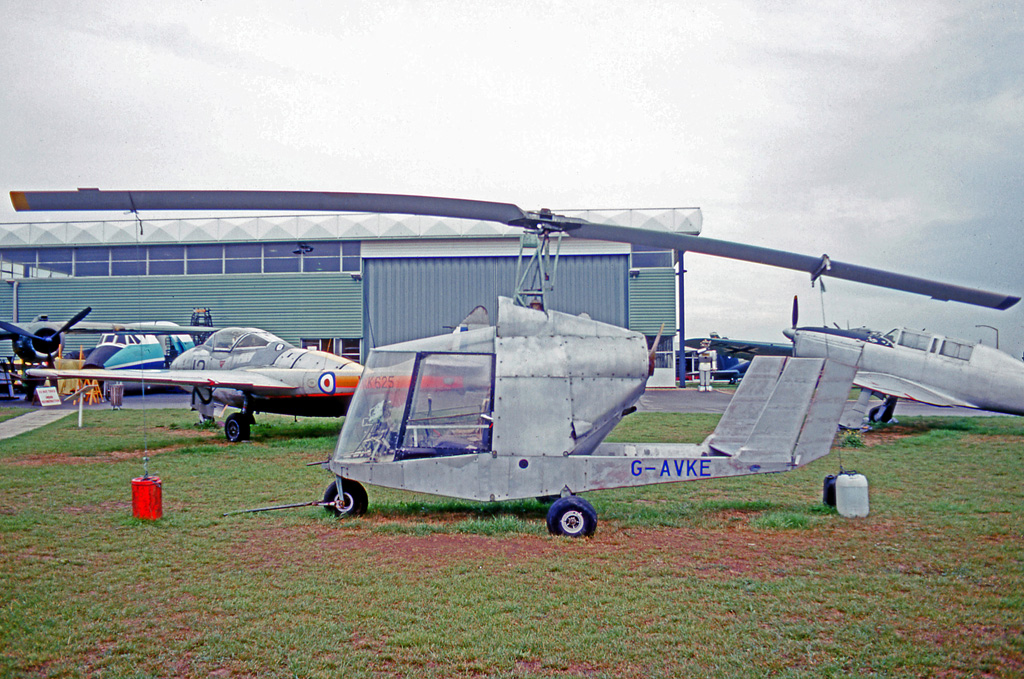
The sole Gadfly displayed at Southend Airport in 1976 complete with main rotor and pusher propeller

== Specifications ==
Data from

General characteristics

- Crew: one
- Capacity: one
- Length: 22 ft 0 in (6.71 m)
- Gross weight: 1,600 lb (726 kg)
- Powerplant: 1 × Rolls-Royce Continental IO-346-A , 165 hp (123 kW)
- Main rotor diameter: 37 ft 0 in (11.28 m)

Performance

- Cruise speed: 110 mph (176 km/h, 96 kn)
- Range: 460 mi (740 km, 400 nmi)

== See also ==
Related lists

- List of autogyro models
