= SNCASO SO.1221 Djinn =

French two-seat light helicopter

SO.1221 Djinn
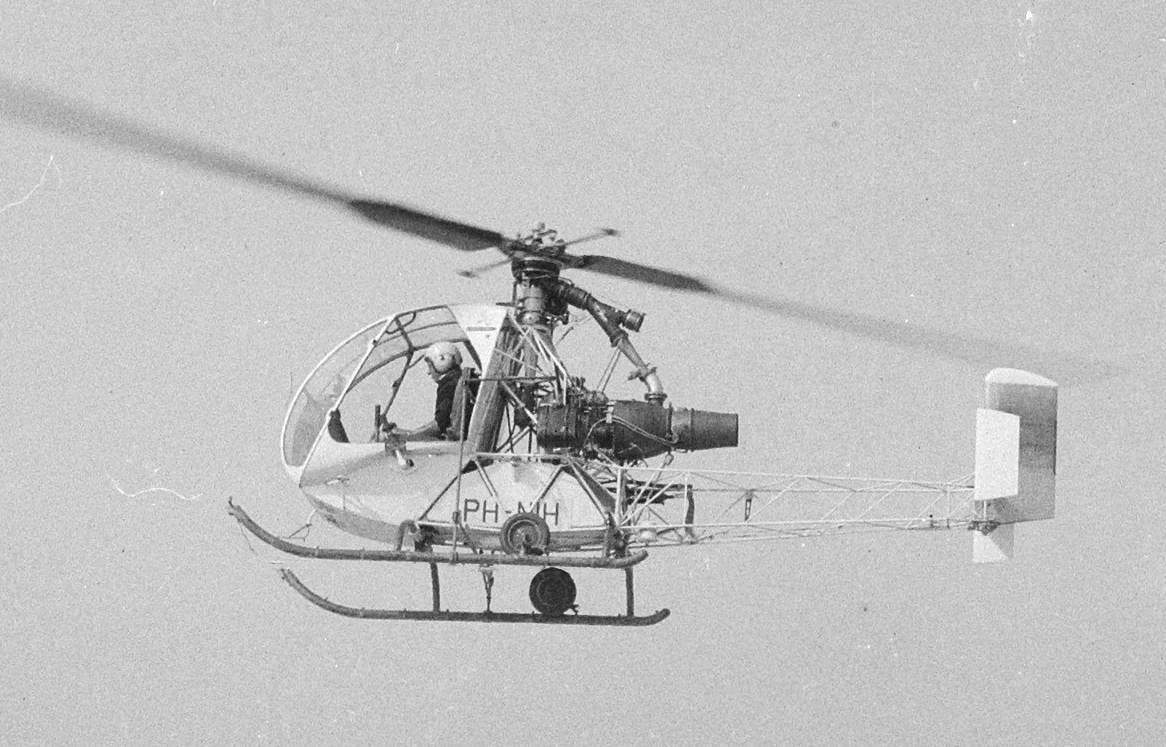
- Sud-Ouest Djinn

General information
- Type: Light helicopter
- National origin: France
- Manufacturer: Sud-Ouest
- Status: retired
- Primary users: French Army German Army
- Number built: 178

History
- First flight: 2 January 1953

The Sud-Ouest SO.1221 Djinn (alternatively written S.O.1221) is a French two-seat light helicopter designed and manufactured by aircraft manufacturer Sud-Ouest (SNCASO), which was later merged into Sud Aviation. It was the first production French helicopter, as well as being one of the first practical European helicopters to be produced. The Djinn was also the first rotorcraft to harness tip-jet propulsion to enter production, and the first production turbine powered helicopter.

The Djinn was developed to function as a practical implementation of the earlier experimental Sud-Ouest Ariel rotorcraft. Atypically, the rotor was driven by compressed-air jets at the end of each blade, which had the benefit of eliminating the need for an anti-torque tail rotor. The compressed air was bled from the turbine engine, and the engine exhaust was used for directional control. On 2 January 1953, the proof-of-concept SO.1220 performed its maiden flight; it was followed by the first of the SO.1221 Djinn prototypes on 16 December 1953. During the subsequence test program, one of the prototypes was recorded as having achieved a world altitude record.

Having been suitably impressed by the performance of the Djinn during testing, both the French Army and the German Army chose to procure the type, as well as a number of other customers. Operationally, the type was used for various purposes, including liaison, aerial observation, training, and casualty evacuation. The Djinn was phased out of production during the 1960s as a consequence of the greater success of the comparably more conventional Aérospatiale Alouette II and Aérospatiale Alouette III helicopters.

== Development ==
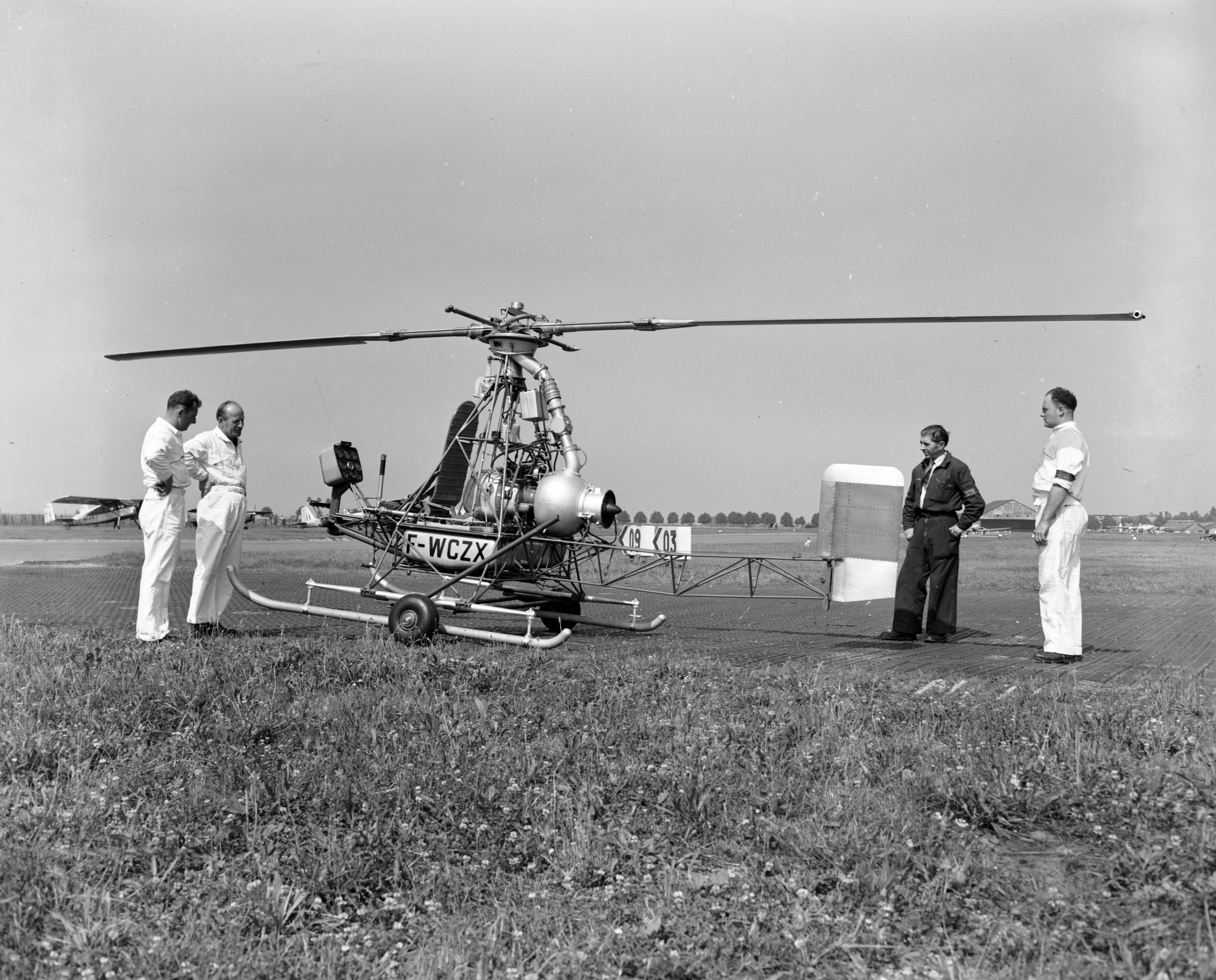
SO.1220 prototype displayed at the Paris Air Show in 1953

Positive experiences that had gained from the earlier Ariel experimental tip jet helicopter had given French aviation company Sud-Ouest a strong desire to pursue development of a practical light helicopter that would harness this technology. Out of their efforts towards this aim emerged the design of a light twin-seat rotorcraft, which was promptly designated as the SO.1221 Djinn. While this newer design did not share an identical tip jet system to the Ariel, the type did rely upon the same basic concept of feeding compressed air, which was generated by an onboard pump, to the tips of the vehicle's rotor blades to drive the movement of the blades.

A single seat prototype, designated SO.1220, was constructed to function as an aerial test bed for the rotorcraft's propulsion concept. On 2 January 1953, the SO.1220, which was a simple uncovered structure with an exposed seat for the pilot, conducted its maiden flight; early test flights of the rotorcraft proved the viability of the propulsion system. Accordingly, it was decided to proceed with the production of five two-seat prototypes, designated as the SO.1221; the first of these flew on 16 December 1953. Within a few days, one of the prototypes had climbed to a recorded altitude of 4,789 m (15,712 ft) to establish a record in its class.

During the late 1950s, an improved version of the Djinn, tentatively designated as the Djinn III or Super Djinn, was being studied by Sud Aviation, who held the intention of pursuing further development of the type at one point. As envisioned, the modifications present upon the projected Super Djinn variant would have included the adoption of the newer Turbomeca Palouste IV engine; alongside other changes, it would have possessed both greater power and endurance than the original production model.

== Design ==
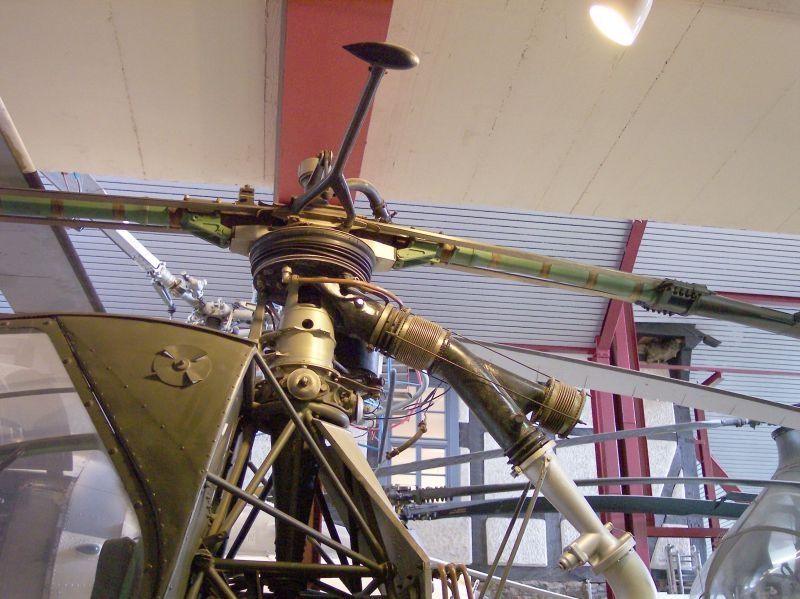
Close up view of the Djinn's upper section and rotor

The Sud-Ouest Djinn was the first tip-jet propelled rotorcraft to enter production. As such, the propulsion system involved a Turbomeca Palouste gas turbine engine that drove a pump to produce compressed air, which was in turn fed into the aircraft's hollow rotor blades to exit at their tips, causing the blades to rotate. The rotor hub assembly, which freely oscillated around a spherical thrust bearing, was mounted on a steel pylon by means of a ball joint and rubber shock absorbers. Unlike some of the experimental tip-jet designs of the era, a 'cold' tip-jet approach was used: that there was no combustion activity present at the exhaust nozzles installed at the ends of the rotor blades. Consequently, the nozzles produced little noise in operation, and were claimed by Sud-Ouest to be "noiseless".

The all-metal rotor blades, through which the compressed air travelled to be ejected at the blade tips, consist of a spar of tapering thickness, a honeycomb-filled trailing edge, and feature faired roots to the increase their lift coefficient. It was claimed that the blades possessed a highly homogenous structure, a highly finished surface and a constant profile, and could be easily dismantled to facilitate inspection of the main spar. The blade had no risk of icing owing to the internal current of warm air. The Djinn used relatively standard flight controls, such as the collective pitch control (upon which the throttle was positioned) and adjustable friction trims.

Apart from its method of propulsion, the Djinn was a relatively conventional helicopter, featuring a two-seat side-by-side configuration in an enclosed cabin. The cockpit is provided with an array of plexiglas panels, which provide the occupants with a high level of all-round visibility. Directly to the rear of the cockpit was the rotorcraft's single Palouste engine. The engine lacked any electronics and had to be hand-started via a crank handle located on the starboard side of the fuselage. The Djinn possessed the ability to fly at high overload weights for around 5 sec by correctly harnessing the accumulated kinetic energy of the rotor; this 'jump' technique was successfully used to achieve certification for it to be operated to carry heavy payloads, some of which could represent up to 54% of the rotorcraft's overall gross weight.

The Djinn featured a two-seat cockpit as standard, which accommodated a pilot and passenger. A range of specialised equipment could be outfitted to suit mission roles, such as stretcher carriers, spray bars, radio sets, electrical systems, additional fuel tanks, and a load-bearing hook. Akin to the later Aérospatiale Alouette II helicopter, the Djinn made considerable use of pneumatic systems. According to aerospace publication Flight International, considerable weight savings had been on the rotorcraft via the use of bleed air to operate various cockpit indicators and functions, including the blind-flying instruments, fuel gauges, cabin heaters, windshield demisters, trimmers, air/sea rescue hoists and crop-spraying equipment.

The rotorcraft was equipped with an uncovered tail boom, fitted with twin fins and a rudder; both directional control and stability were provided by the controlled deflection of exhaust gases from the engine. As a consequence of the torque-free method of rotor propulsion, the Djinn did not require the presence of an anti-torque tail rotor. A simplistic wheel-equipped twin-skid arrangement was also present; this was retractable by the same manually operated crank handle used for engine start. The Djinn could also be deployed with multiple armaments. In the ground-attack role, it could be equipped with a single machine gun, which was manned from the second seat of the cockpit. For performing anti-tank warfare, the Djinn was able to carry a guided missile. When deployed in an effective manner against an adversary, the manufacturer claimed the combination to be extremely difficult for an opposing tank to sight its adversary and to defend itself during the anticipated rapid speed of engagements.

== Operational history ==
Having observed the development of the Djinn with considerable interest, the French Army encouraged the construction of a pre-production batch of 22 helicopters, which were used for evaluation purposes. The first of these pre-production aircraft flew on 23 September 1954. Three of the pre-production helicopters were subsequently acquired by the United States Army, designating it as the YHO-1, for the purpose of participating in their own series of trials; according to aviation author Stanley S. McGowen, the US Army held little interest in the type. According to author Wayne Mutza, the US Army had found the YHO-1 to be an excellent weapons platform, but had been compelled to abandon interest in the programme by political opposition to the procurement of a rotorcraft that had non-American origins.

The French Army ordered a total of 100 helicopters. The Djinn was operated by the French Army in variety of mission roles, such as liaison, observation, training purposes; when flown with a single pilot, it could be outfitted with two external litters for the casualty evacuation mission. In addition to the French military, a further ten countries placed orders for the type; such as a batch of six rotorcraft which were procured by the German Army. Production of the Djinn came to an end during the mid-1960s, by which point a total of 178 Djinns had been constructed; the type had effectively been replaced by the more conventional and highly successful Aérospatiale Alouette II. Some Djinns were sold on to civil operators; in this capacity, they were often equipped for agricultural purposes, fitted with chemical tanks and spray bars.

== Operators ==
A Swiss SO.1221 Djinn

Cameroon

- Cameroon Air Force 10 in service 1972-1998

France

- French Army

Germany

- Federal German Heeresfligerei

Switzerland

- Swiss Army, 4 acquired, retired in 1966

Mexico

== Specifications ==
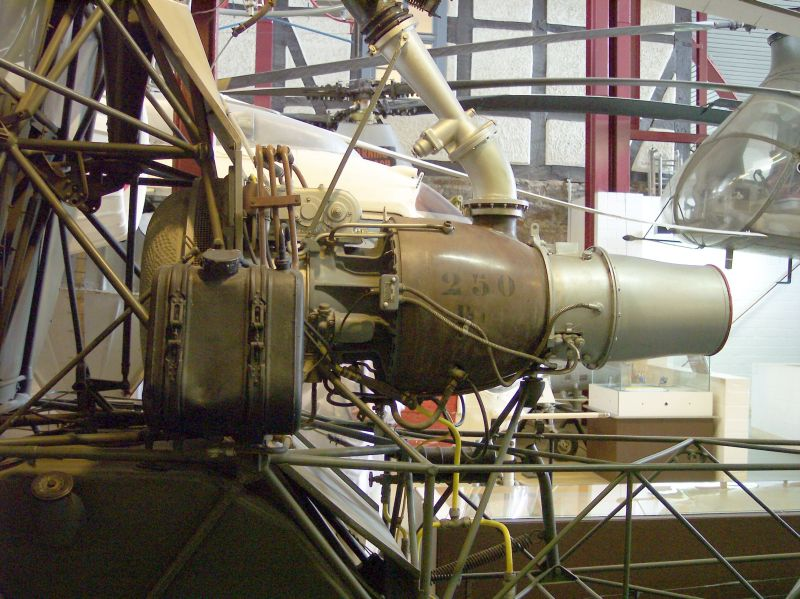
A preserved Turbomeca Palouste IV turbo-compressor

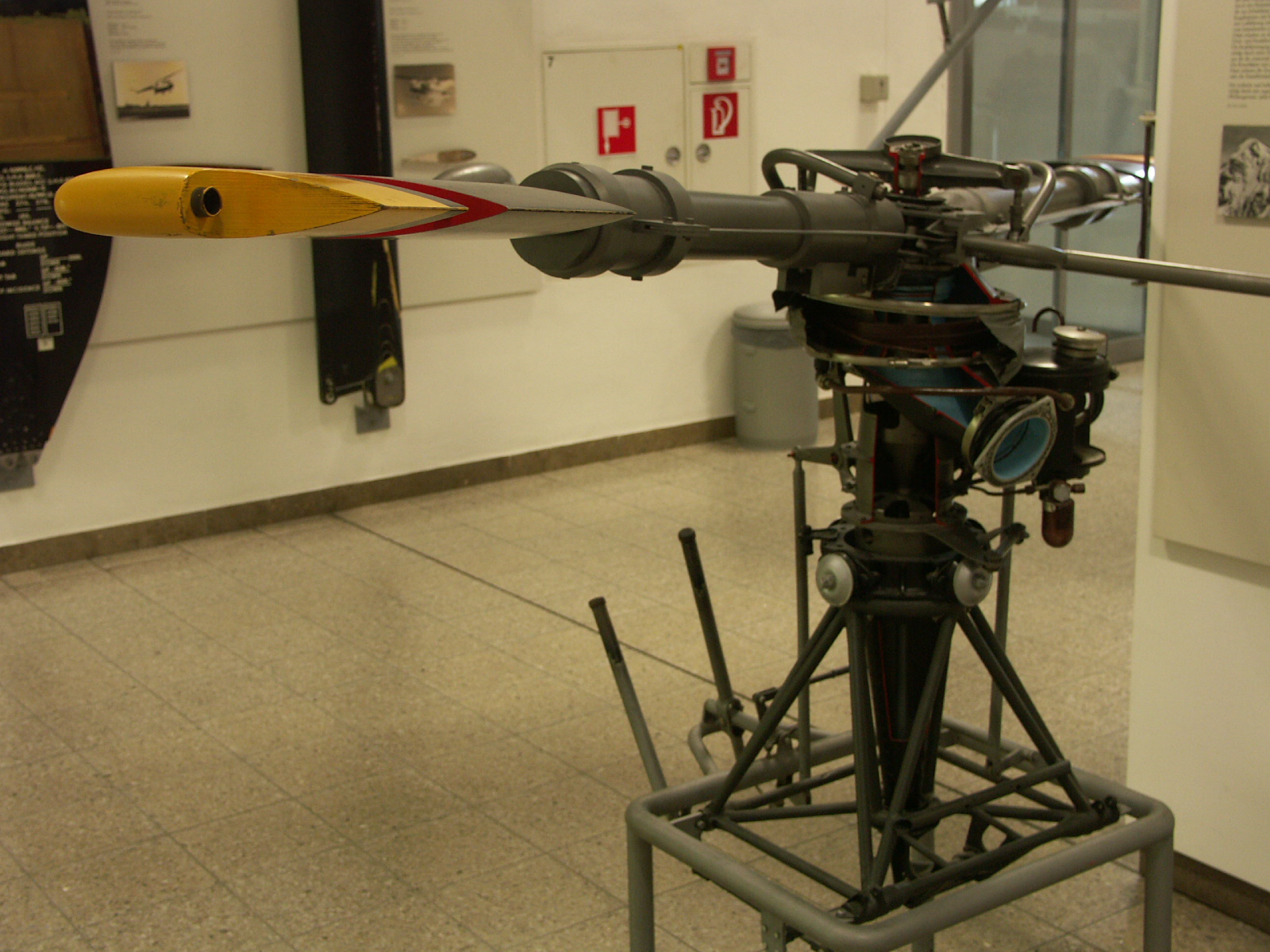
View of a Djinn's rotor mast and rotor blade

Data from The Illustrated Encyclopedia of Aircraft

General characteristics

- Crew: 1-2
- Capacity: 0-1
- Length: 5.3 m (17 ft 5 in)
- Height: 2.6 m (8 ft 6 in)
- Empty weight: 360 kg (794 lb)
- Gross weight: 800 kg (1,764 lb)
- Powerplant: 1 × Turbomeca Palouste IV turbo-compressor, 179 kW (240 hp) (gas horsepower)
- Main rotor diameter: 11 m (36 ft 1 in)
- Main rotor area: 95.03 m^{2} (1,022.9 sq ft)

Performance

- Maximum speed: 130 km/h (81 mph, 70 kn)
- Range: 220 km (140 mi, 120 nmi)
- Endurance: 2 hours 15 minutes
- Service ceiling: 3,000 m (9,800 ft)

== See also ==
Related development

- Tip jet

Aircraft of comparable role, configuration, and era

- Fairey Ultra-light Helicopter
- NHI H-3 Kolibrie
- Percival P.74
- Hiller YH-32 Hornet (Also tip-jet)
