= Barnett J4B =

Small gyroplane

J4B
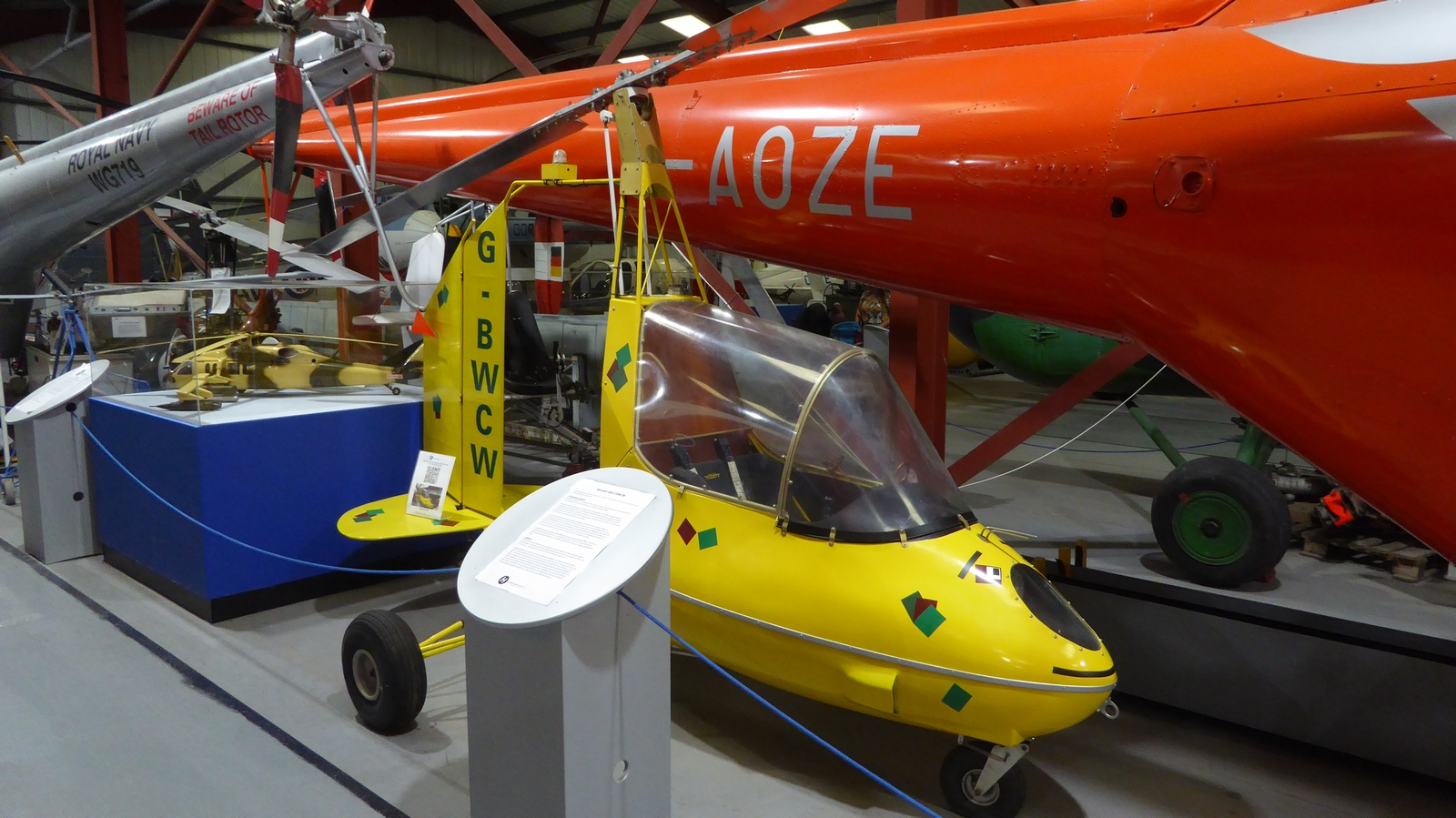
- Barnett J4B G-BWCW autogyro at The Helicopter Museum, Weston-super-Mare, UK

General information
- Type: Recreational autogyro
- National origin: United States
- Manufacturer: Homebuilt
- Designer: Jerry Barnett

The Barnett J4B is a small gyroplane marketed in the United States by Barnett Rotorcraft for homebuilding. Originally flown as the J-3M with an open cockpit and fabric-covered sides, later versions have a fiberglass cockpit pod either partially or fully enclosing the pilot. Apart from the basic J4B, versions available in 2007 included the BRC540 (two seats side-by-side) and J4B2 (two seats in tandem).

== Variants ==
J-3M
Original variant with 48.5 kW (65.0 hp) Continental A65 engine.
J-4M
Improved J-3M with 63.5 kW (85.2 hp) Continental C85 engine.
J4B
Single-seat autogyro with 23 ft rotor.
J4B-2
Two-seat variant of the J4B with a 25ft 4in rotor.

== Specifications (typical J4B) ==
General characteristics

- Crew: one pilot
- Length: 12 ft 4 in (3.76 m)
- Height: 7 ft 8 in (2.34 m)
- Empty weight: 530 lb (240 kg)
- Gross weight: 880 lb (400 kg)
- Powerplant: 1 × Continental O-200 , 100 hp (75 kW)
- Main rotor diameter: 23 ft 0 in (6.10 m)
- Main rotor area: 314 sq ft (29.2 m^{2})

Performance

- Maximum speed: 125 mph (200 km/h, 109 kn)
