= Fairey Ultra-light Helicopter =

Prototype light helicopter by Fairey

Ultra-light Helicopter
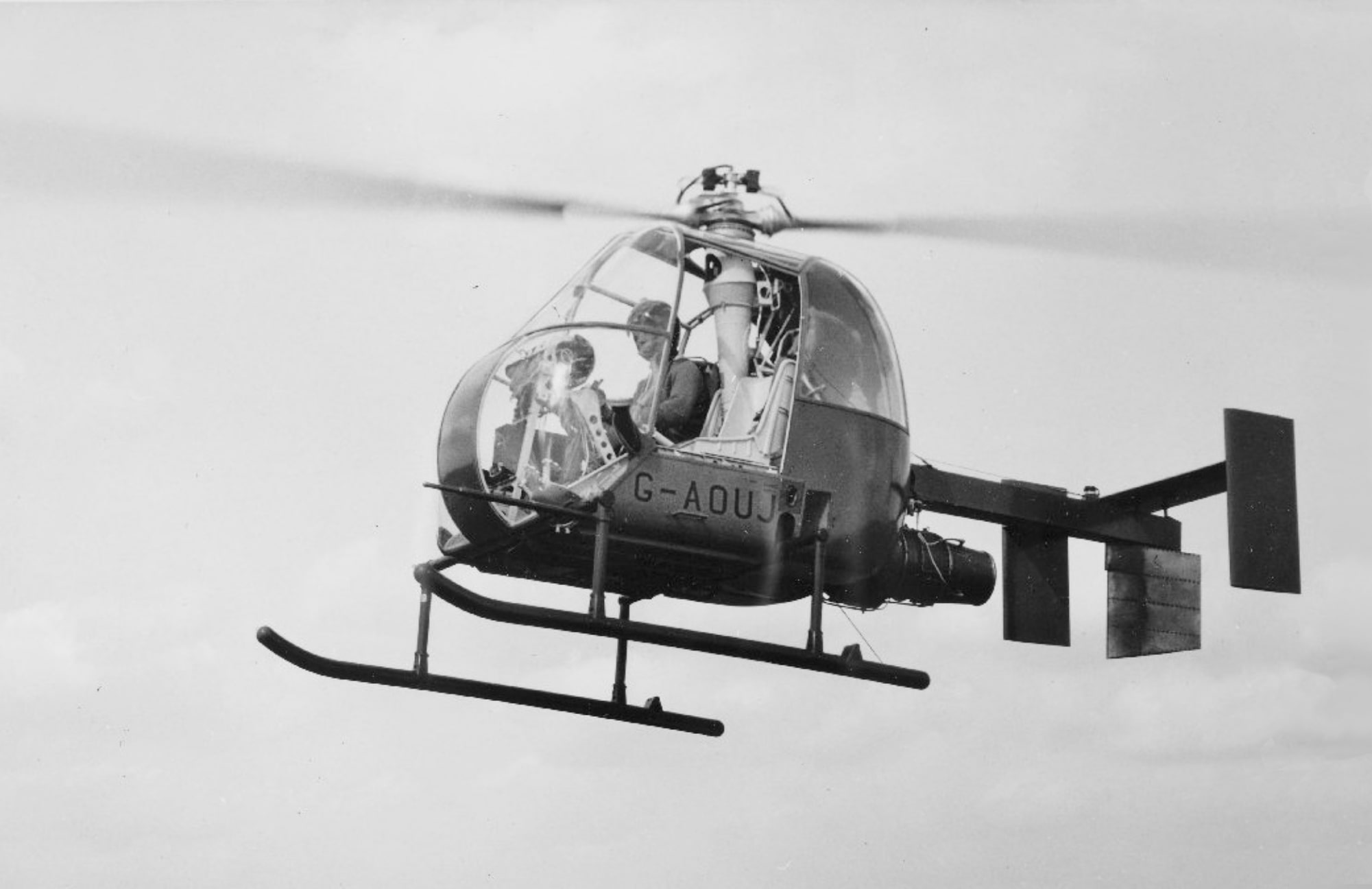
- The Ultra-light Helicopter in flight

General information
- Type: Light Army helicopter
- National origin: United Kingdom
- Manufacturer: Fairey Aviation Company
- Status: Retired
- Number built: 6

History
- First flight: 14 August 1955
- Retired: 1959

The Fairey Ultra-light Helicopter was a small British military helicopter intended to be used for reconnaissance and casualty evacuation, designed by the Fairey Aviation Company.

The Ultra-light had been conceived of as a straightforward, low cost and easily transportable helicopter. It lacked any tail rotor due to the decision to propel the rotorcraft using unconventional tip jets positioned at the ends of the rotor blades. It had been selected amongst various competing projects to meet a Ministry of Supply requirement for a lightweight helicopter to be used by the British Army for aerial observation purposes. Early trials with prototypes proved promising, however political factors ultimately undermined the project.

The Ultra-light found itself a casualty of the British defence economies of the later 1950s, as well as of intense competition from rival firms who had their own light rotorcraft projects, in particular the Saunders-Roe Skeeter. While Fairey attempted to proceed with development of the Ultra-light independently, promoting the type towards the civil market and achieving appropriate type certification for such use, no orders were ultimately received. The firm shelved the project, choosing to concentrate on the larger Fairey Rotodyne instead, which shared some design features.

== Development ==
=== Origins ===
During the early 1950s, the British Army was strongly interested in the potential use of compact helicopters in the observation and aerial observation roles. In 1953 a requirement was issued by the British Ministry of Supply for a low-cost two-seat helicopter, which would be suitable for reconnaissance, casualty evacuation and training duties. This specification was considered to be quite demanding, calling for it to be capable of high speeds and rates of climb even under tropical conditions. The rotorcraft was also required to be transportable on the back of a standard Army three-ton truck, constricting the dimensions of the prospective vehicle considerably.

Further requirements for the prospective light helicopter included a flight endurance of one hour along with the potential for carrying light cargoes such as fuel and tools, as well as stretcher-bound wounded troops. An initial request for a rear-facing observer's seat was present early on, but was discarded in later revisions. At this time, newly developed gas turbines were beginning to appeal both to helicopter designers and to prospective operators, the British Army made the use of such an engine one of its requirements.

There was also an interest in producing rotorcraft that made use of tip-driven rotors, which had the advantage of avoiding the torque that would be produced by rotors driven by a conventional transmission as well as the consequential requirement to incorporate a complicated and vulnerable torque-compensating tail rotor. Some contemporary designs, such as the Sud-Ouest Djinn, bled high pressure air from the engine directly to the tips; Fairey had been conducting work into a scheme where this air was mixed with fuel at the tips and burned. Such methods had already been flight tested on the Fairey Jet Gyrodyne, and Fairey decided that the technique would be suitable for a compact rotorcraft.

=== Competition and selection ===
A diverse range of entries were submitted in response to the issuing of the requirement; amongst these were Fairey Aviation with its Ultra-light Helicopter harnessing Tip jet propulsion, Saunders-Roe with a smaller version of the Saunders-Roe Skeeter, the Bristol Aeroplane Company's proposed 190, a ducted rotor proposal by Percival Aircraft, Short Brothers proposed the larger Short SB.8, and a ram jet-powered proposal by Austrian helicopter pioneer Raoul Hafner.

A suitable powerplant for a compact rotorcraft had been identified in the form of the Turbomeca Palouste turbojet engine, for which arrangements had already been independently reached with British firm Blackburn to produce the engine under licence from Turbomeca. Fairey adopted the Palouste engine, which provided compressed air through the hollow rotor blades to the tip jets. According to aviation author Derek Wood: "the Fairy Ultra Light was a masterpiece of simplicity. It dispensed with a tail rotor since the tip-driven main rotor was torqueless and it eliminated the shafts, gears, and clutches associated with piston-engined designs".

In response to the detailed design submission that Fairey had produced for their proposal, the Ministry decided to award the firm a contract to produce a total of four development aircraft for demonstration and flight testing purposes; the company later decided to construct a further two more rotorcraft as a private venture.

== Design ==
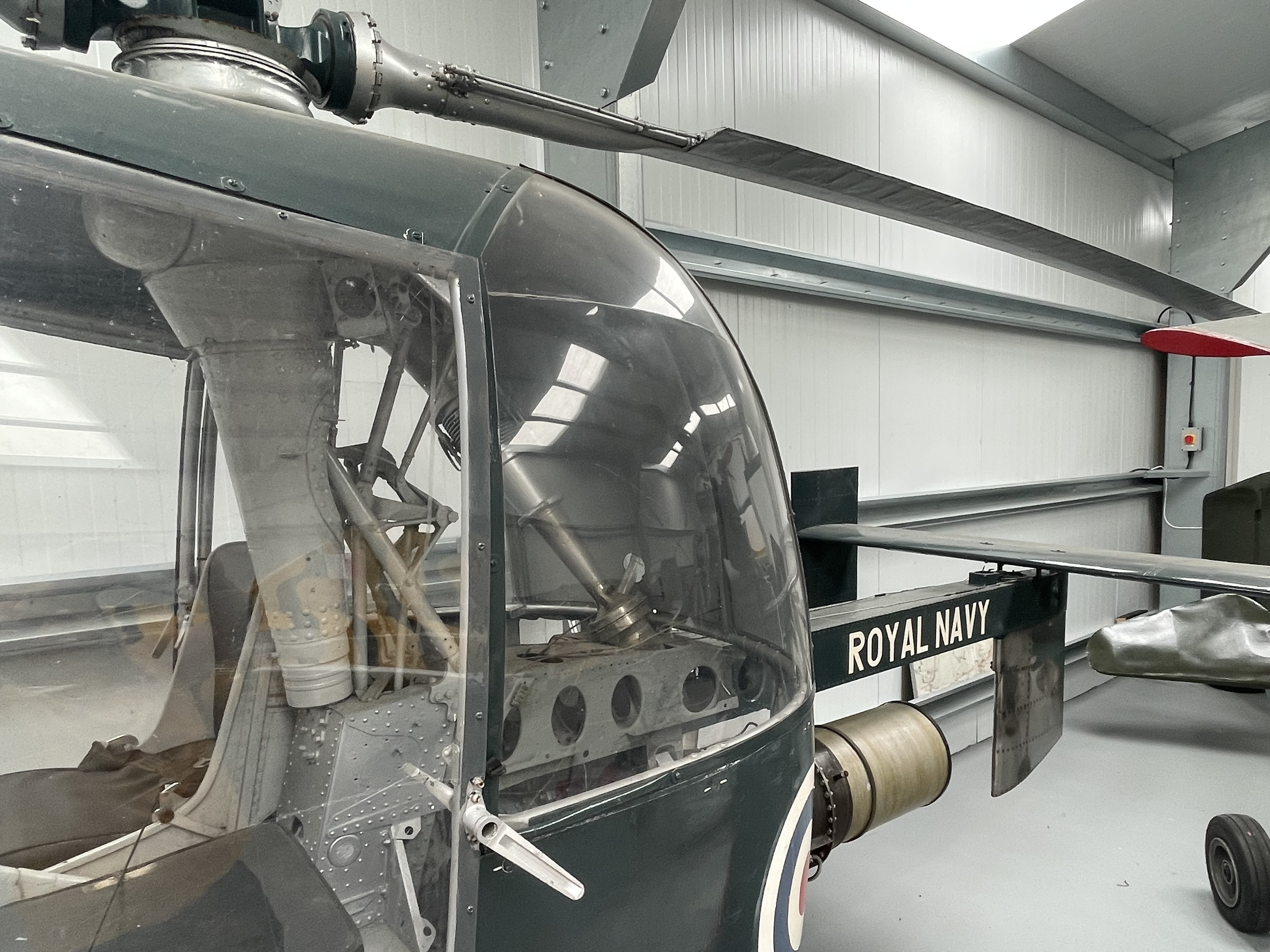
The rear of the Fairey Ultra-light at the Midland Air Museum, showing the box-section tail boom, and the rudder that acted on the jet exhaust, 2025

The Fairey Ultra-light Helicopter emerged as a compact side-by-side two-seater, powered by a single Turbomeca Palouste turbojet engine, which was produced under licence by Blackburn. It was mounted semi-externally at floor level, behind the seats. The engine was furnished with an oversized compressor for the purpose of providing air to the tip-burners at 40 psi (275 kPa); this arrangement eliminated the necessity for a tail rotor in order to counteract torque, which was not a factor with the tip jet configuration adopted. The Palouste engine was by far the most costly element of the Ultra-light, reportedly comprising in excess of 50 per cent of the craft's purchase cost.

The Ultra-light was constructed around a light alloy box that placed the rubber-mounted rotor pylon at the centre of the upper surface; a tip-driven twin-blade teetering rotor unit was set upon the rotor pylon. The rotor diameter was 28 feet 3.5 inches (8.623 m), while the overall weight of the Ultra-light was only 1,800 lb (820 kg). Fuel was housed within a single crash-proof fuel tank set within the box.

The alloy box structure was attached to and carried a box girder tail boom on which the engine, a horizontal tailplane and vertical stabilizer and rudder surfaces were mounted. The rudder projected beneath the boom into the jet efflux and provided effective yaw control even when the aircraft was stationary. The undercarriage was a simple pair of tubular steel skids directly attached to the box structure, porter bars could be attached to the skids to allow the rotorcraft to be carried by hand.

== Operational history ==
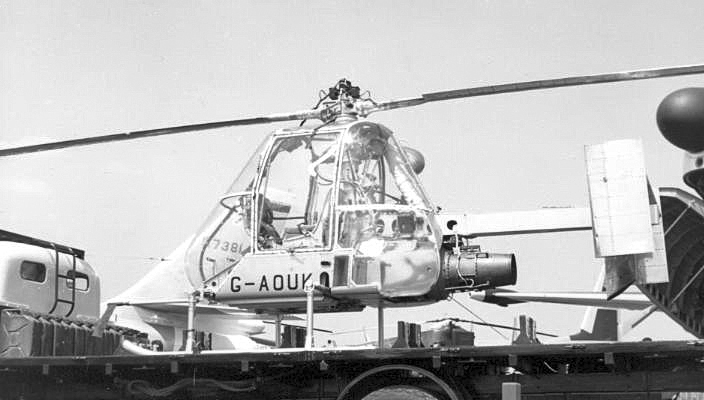
On a lorry at the 1957 Paris Air Show

On 14 August 1955, the first prototype Ultra-light helicopter conducted its maiden flight. It made a public appearance at the September Society of British Aircraft Constructors (SBAC) show at Farnborough that year. During the Farnborough demonstration, the Ultra-light performed a demonstration of its ability to operate from the back of a three-ton truck, one of the high-profile requirements that had been issued by the British Army.

After its completion, several modifications were made to the first prototype. This machine originally had only the rudder at the end of the boom, but a horizontal tailplane bearing end-plate fins was later added. A less obvious change was the addition of hydraulically-assisted cyclic pitch control. The second prototype had a modified cabin which allowed for stretcher-borne casualties to be carried. A pair of Ultra-lights were equipped with a slightly larger diameter rotor (32 ft/9.75 m rather than 28 ft/8.6 m) for the purpose of improving performance in situations where compactness was not at a premium. It had been recognised that there was a need for the rotor blades to have a longer lifespan.

There were many demonstrations of the Ultra-light's capabilities performed at airshows, during military exercises and at sea, including a deployment aboard the U-class destroyer HMS Grenville. However, the British Army had become more focused on the Saunders-Roe Skeeter and addressing that rotorcraft's shortcomings, such as ground resonance and engine issues. According to Wood, the rival Skeeter had made a good early impression in Germany and had attracted the offer of a military order for the type from the German government, but that this was on the condition that the Skeeter was in turn adopted by the British armed forces as well. Thus, the decision was taken in Whitehall to concentrate on the Skeeter, effectively abandoning the Ministry requirement that the Ultra-light was being developed towards meeting.

Having become aware that the British Army was no longer likely to order the Ultra-light, Fairey instead promoted the type for its potential use within the Royal Navy. While some trials were conducted, including one prototype being successfully tested for suitability on board an aircraft carrier, the Navy appeared to lack enthusiasm for the Ultra-light and it became clear that the Ministry would not be providing any further funding for its development. Recognising that the prospects for a military order from the British services to have become very limited, the company decided to re-orientate the Ultra-light to conform with the preferences and needs of civil operators instead.

Fairey proceeded to develop a dedicated model of the Ultra-light for the civil market, specifically designed to be capable of conducting functions such as communications activities and crop spraying. Accordingly, a civil registered example of the type was exhibited at the 1957 Paris Air Show at Paris Le Bourget Airport. During 1958, civil airworthiness certification was achieved for the Ultra-light, effectively clearing the type for use by civilian operators.

Despite considerable interest from abroad, particularly from customers in the US and Canada, no orders for the type were received and only the six development Ultra-lights were constructed before the programme was ultimately abandoned in 1959. A major factor in Fairey deciding to terminate work on the programme, aside from the lack of orders, was the limited resources available to the company, and the increasing levels of work on the then-promising Fairey Rotodyne, a much larger compound gyrocopter that also made use of tip jets and some of features of the Ultra-light.

== Surviving aircraft ==
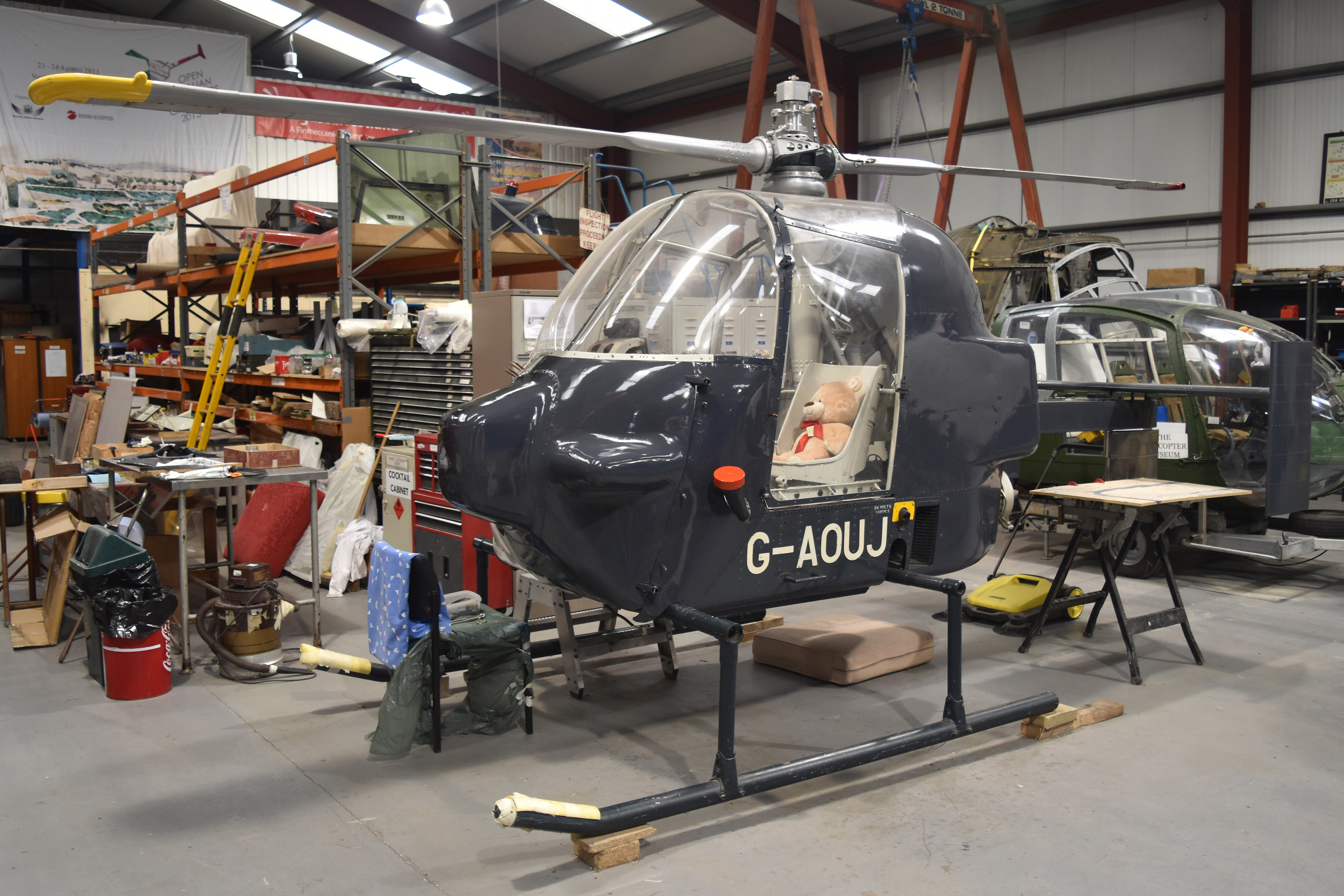
A restored example at The Helicopter Museum of Weston-super-Mare, U.K., in 2020

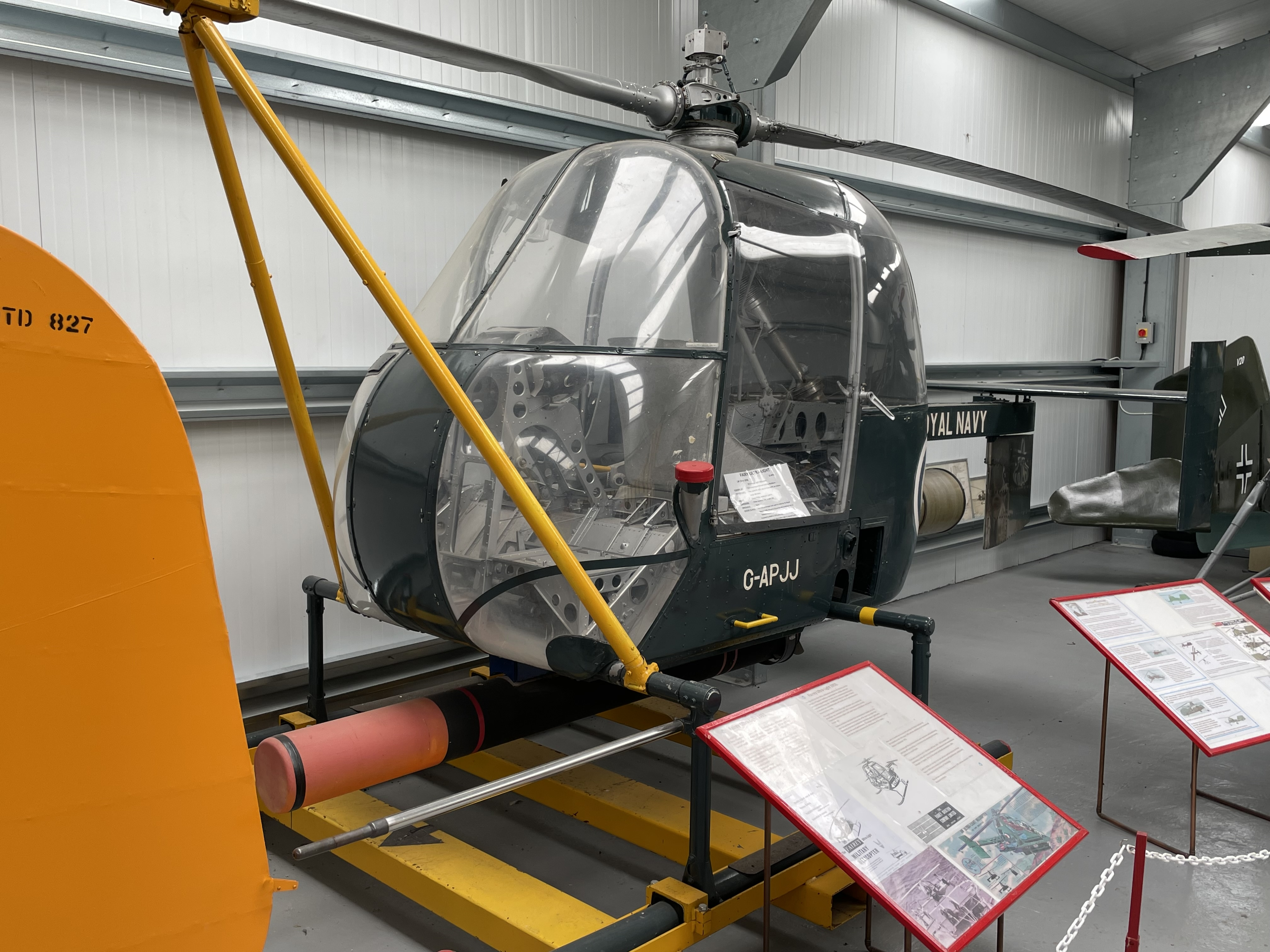
Fairey Ultra-light Helicopter, preserved and on display at the Midland Air Museum, 2025

The second prototype of the Ultra-light, which featured a modified nose so that it could accommodate a stretcher for its intended use as a casualty evacuation helicopter. In 1977, it was rediscovered in a derelict condition on a farm near Harlow and was promptly transferred to The Helicopter Museum, being moved to Weston-super-Mare in May 1979 and put into storage prior to its restoration. A set of original rotor blades, an engine and the original tail unit were acquired. It was restored and placed on public display in July 2021.

The sixth prototype to be completed, G-APJJ, was tested by the Royal Aircraft Establishment at Thurleigh, Bedford and by the Royal Navy, before being retired. After periods of lengthy storage it was given for exhibition at the Midland Air Museum at Coventry Airport located at Baginton, to the south of the city.

== Specifications ==
Data from Fairey Aircraft since 1915, Jane's All the World's Aircraft 1958-59

General characteristics

- Crew: 2
- Capacity: 640 lb (290 kg) payload
- Length: 14 ft 1 in (4.29 m)
- Height: 8 ft 2 in (2.49 m)
- Gross weight: 1,800 lb (816 kg)
- Powerplant: 1 × Blackburn-Turbomeca BnPe.2 Palouste 500 gas turbine gas generator
- Main rotor diameter: 28 ft 3.5 in (8.623 m)

Performance

- Cruise speed: 98 mph (158 km/h, 85 kn)
- Range: 180 mi (290 km, 160 nmi) (tropical)
- Hover ceiling OGE: 4,800 ft (1,500 m)
- Endurance: 2 hours 30 minutes (tropical)
- Rate of climb: 950 ft/min (4.8 m/s) vertical at sea level

== See also ==
Aircraft of comparable role, configuration, and era

- Saunders-Roe Skeeter (direct competitor)
- Bell H-13 Sioux
- Bell 47
- Kawasaki KH-4
- SNCASO SO.1221 Djinn
- Hughes TH-55 Osage
- Agusta A.105
- Kamov Ka-15
- PZL SM-4 Łątka

Related lists

- List of rotorcraft
