= Turbomeca Palouste =

1950s French gas generator aircraft engine

Palouste
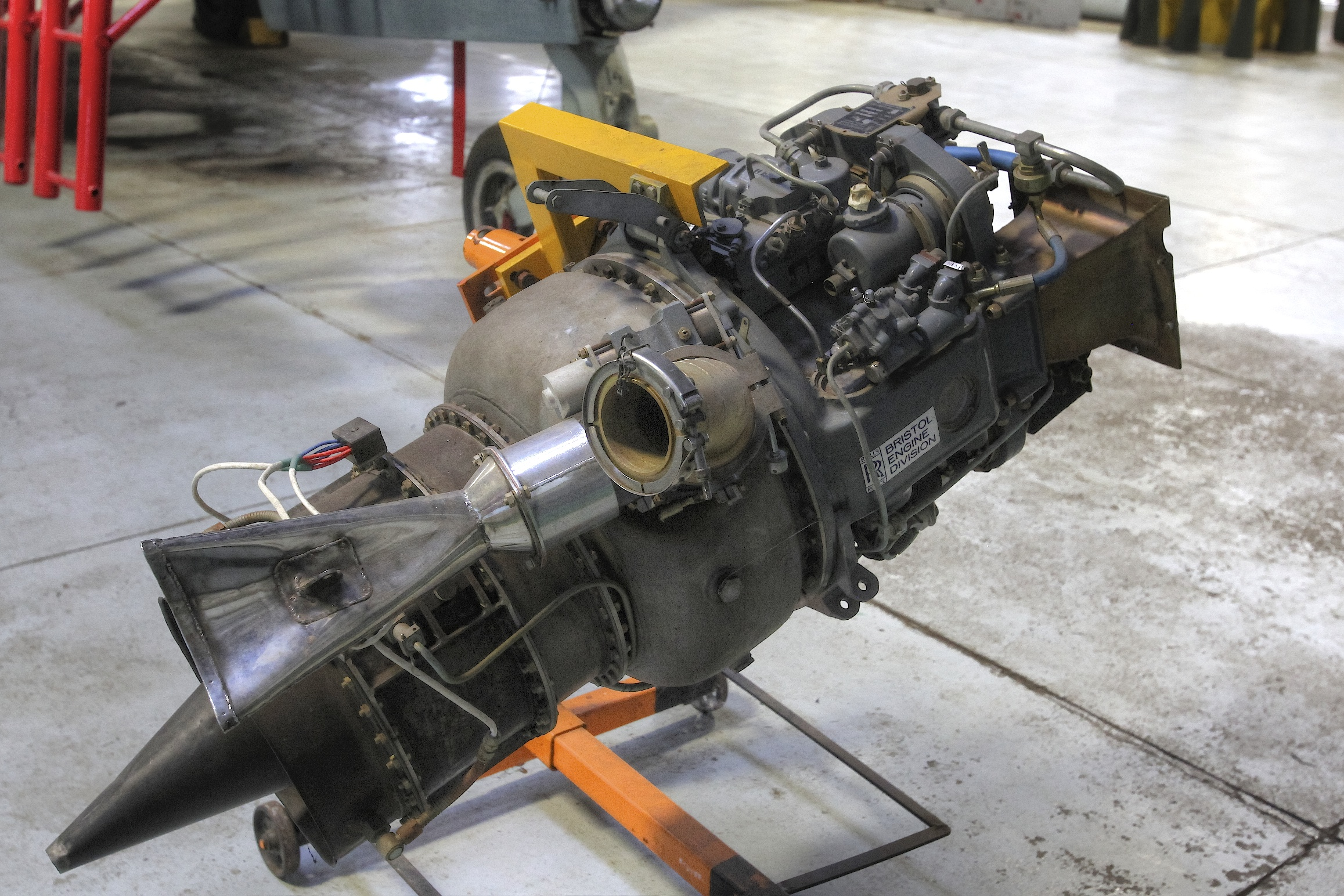
- Rolls-Royce license-built Palouste
- Type: Gas turbine
- National origin: France
- Manufacturer: Turbomeca
- Major applications: Sud-Ouest Djinn

The Turbomeca Palouste is a French gas turbine engine, first run in 1952. Designed purely as a compressed air generator, the Palouste was mainly used as a ground-based aircraft engine starter unit. Other uses included rotor tip propulsion for helicopters.

== Design and development ==
Designed and built by Turbomeca, the Palouste was also built under license in Britain by Blackburn and Rolls-Royce. Originally conceived as an aircraft ground support equipment starter gas generator, it was used also as propulsion for the Sud-Ouest Djinn and other tip-jet powered helicopters.

The Palouste was a very simple unit, its primary purpose being to supply a high flow rate of compressed air to start larger jet engines such as the Rolls-Royce Spey as installed in the Blackburn Buccaneer (this aircraft having no onboard starting system). Air from the centrifugal compressor was divided between external supply (known as bleed air) and its own combustion chamber.

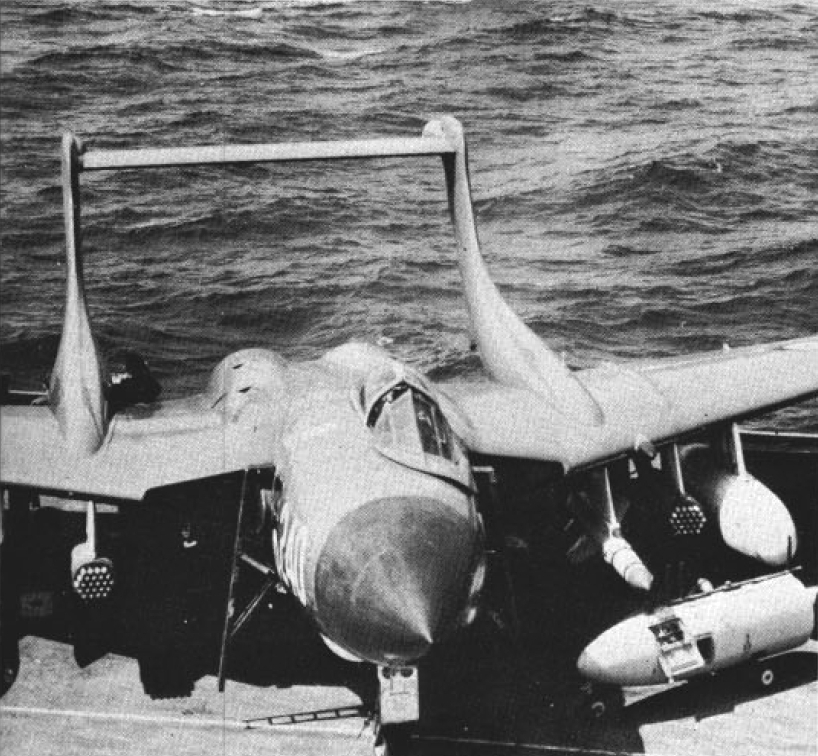
Sea Vixen on the USS Forrestal in 1962. A Palouste air starter pod is in front.

Several British naval aircraft were adapted to carry a Palouste in a wing-mounted air starter pod installation to facilitate engine starting when away from base.

A novel use of a surplus Palouste engine was its installation in a custom-built motorcycle known as the Boost Palouste. In 1986 this motorcycle broke an official ACU 1/4 mile speed record at 296 km/h (184 mph). The builder modified the engine to include a primitive afterburner device and noted that pitch changes which occurred during braking and acceleration caused gyroscopic precession handling effects due to the rotating mass of the engine.

== Variants ==
Palouste IV
The gas generator used to power the Sud-Ouest S.O.1221 Djinn and other tip-jet helicopters.
Palouste IVB
Palouste IVC
Palouste IVD
Palouste IVE
Palouste IVF
Palouste 502
(P.102 and P.104) Blackburn / Bristol Siddeley / Rolls-Royce production for air-starter units.
Autan
A development of the Palouste delivering a higher mass flow of compressed air.
Autan 2
1 x axial + 1 x centrifugal compressor stages

== Applications ==
- Bell Model 65
- Fairey Ultra-light Helicopter
- Sud-Ouest Djinn

== Specifications (Palouste 4) ==
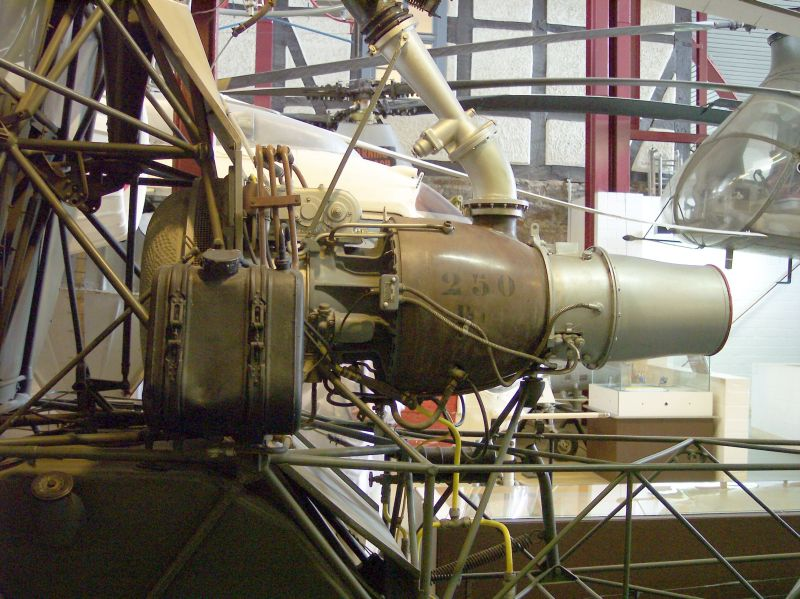
Palouste engine fitted to a Sud-Ouest Djinn helicopter

Data from Flight :BRITISH POWER UNITS 1953,

==== General characteristics ====
- Type: Gas generator
- Length: 1,233 mm (48.5 in)
- Diameter: 478 mm (18.8 in)
- Dry weight: 90 kg (200 lb)

==== Components ====
- Compressor: Single-stage centrifugal flow
- Combustors: Annular combustion chamber
- Turbine: Two-stage axial flow
- Fuel type: Kerosene
- Oil system: Dry sump, pressure spray at 300 kPa (43 psi)

==== Performance ====
- Maximum power output: 190 hp (140 kW) equivalent air horsepower at 33,000 rpm at sea level
- Overall pressure ratio: 3.8:1
- Air mass flow: 3.5 kg/s (7.7 lb/s) at 34,000 rpm
- Turbine inlet temperature: TIT 1,070 K (800 °C) ; JPT 793 K (520 °C) at 34,000 rpm
- Fuel consumption: 110 kg/h (240 lb/h)
- Oil consumption: 0.2 kg/h (0.44 lb/h)
- Thrust-to-weight ratio:
- Air output: 1.1 kg/s (2.4 lb/s) at 350 kPa (51 psi) at 33,000 rpm
- Power-to-weight ratio: 0.61 kg/kW (1 lb/hp)

== See also ==
Related development

- Turbomeca Artouste

Comparable engines

- Napier Oryx

Related lists

- List of aircraft engines
