= Napier Oryx =

Oryx
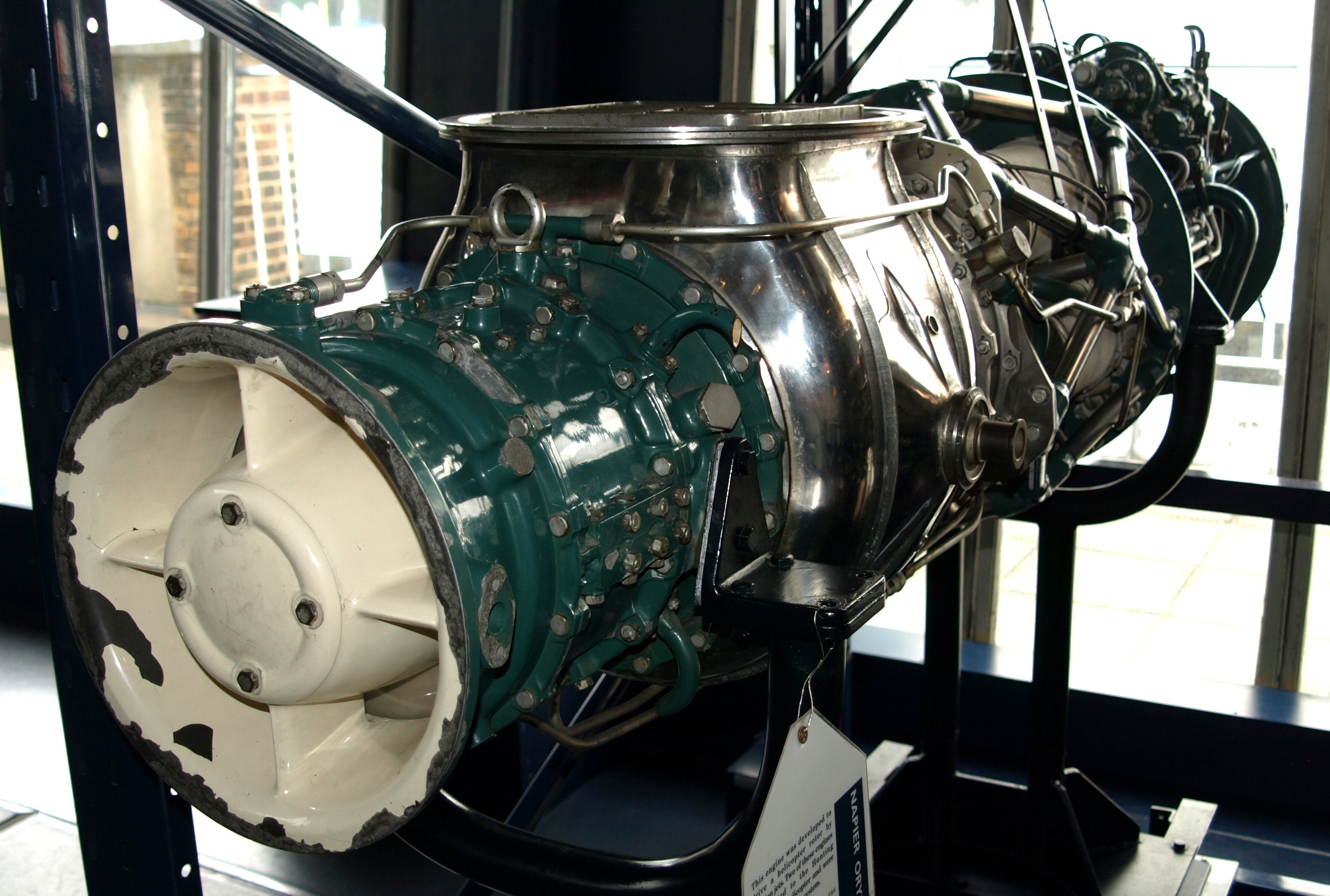
- Napier Oryx at the Science Museum (London)
- Type: Gas turbine gas generator
- Manufacturer: Napier & Son
- First run: November 1953
- Major applications: Percival P.74, Percival P.87

The Napier Oryx was a British gas-turbine engine designed and built by Napier in the early 1950s for the Percival P.74 tip jet-powered helicopter project. The P.74 was unsuccessful and it and the Oryx were cancelled.

== Design and development ==
The engine was developed by the Aero Gas Turbine Division of Napier in conjunction with Percival, later Hunting Percival. Funding came from the Ministry of Supply.

The Percival P.74 was a design for a tipjet-powered helicopter. The jet power was to be supplied from engines within the helicopter and piped to the rotor tips. Napier developed the Oryx specifically to power the P.74.

The output gas temperature from the engines had to be below 400 °C for the helicopter's stainless steel rotor ducts, so a bypass design was used. This also blew "cold" air from the compressor, rather than purely hot turbine exhaust gas. In order to give a compact installation, rather than using an oversized compressor with a bypass around the turbine (as commonly used in the turbofan engine), the Oryx used an auxiliary compressor coupled to the turbine. This was mounted behind the turbine, with its gas flow in the opposite direction to the main engine core. The two gas streams were deflected through 90° in a collector chamber, then exited vertically upwards. Gas flow through this collector was arranged so that each stream remained separate, the cold air from the auxiliary compressor passing through a bifurcated duct, so as to wrap around the hotter turbine outlet. By this means, the duct was further protected from the hot exhaust. Separator plates inside each duct split the stream into a number of flows and deflected each one separately, thus preserving the flows approximately constant across the whole duct. When the flows finally merged, they were flowing parallel and at approximately the same velocity, thus reducing turbulence and energy loss.

A starting valve, consisting of a Corliss non-throttling rotating valve in combination with a butterfly valve (closed in flight), (Note: A typical "butterfly" valve restricts flow somewhat, even when completely open) could divert individual engine output to the outside of the aircraft, permitting engine starting and ground running with the rotor stationary. Without the valve, back pressure in the duct and rotor system would prevent the starting of the engine. In the P.74 the two Oryx engines fed their outputs to a common duct that took the thrust to the rotor head.

Development of the engine began in 1951. The engine was designed with a 12-stage axial flow compressor less than nine inches (23 cm) in diameter and a set of nine tie rods around the periphery of the compressor discs linking them together. Air from the compressor was fed to an array of five tubular combustion chambers, with the resulting hot gas driving a two-stage turbine connected to the four-stage auxiliary compressor via geared couplings. The first Oryx prototype engine was started for the first time in November 1953 and about 1,400 hours of test running had been achieved by the end of July 1955.

The Oryx was expected to be used for the planned commercial P.105 development of the P.74. In the P.105 the two engines would have been fitted back to front on either side of the rotor mast, feeding their outputs to the rotor hub. It was anticipated that 900 "gas horsepower" could be produced in its developed form.

Additionally Percival had envisioned using the Oryx in a fixed wing aircraft role, using Oryx engines to power the twin-engined P.87 airliner. The P.87 was to have shoulder-mounted high wing design, with the Oryx's powering pusher propellers through the same tip-jet system as planned for the P.74. The P.87 failed to progress beyond desktop models and appears to have been cancelled by 1955, even before the cancelling of the P.74 helicopter project in 1956.

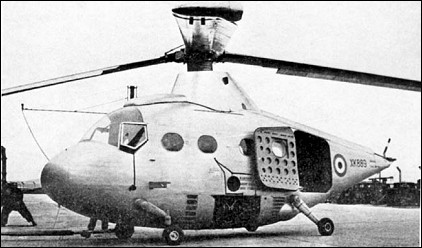
The Percival P.74 with the port Oryx engine cover removed

== Variants ==
E.146 Oryx
Company designation.
NOr.1
Ministry of Supply (MoS) designation for the first variant.
NOr.5
MoS designation for the fifth variant; 950 hp (710 kW) gas hp at 22,600 rpm for take-off at sea level.

== Engines on display ==
A preserved Napier Oryx is on display at the Science Museum (London).

== Specifications (Oryx N.Or.1) ==
Data from Flight and Aircraft Engines of the World 1957.

==== General characteristics ====
- Type: Single shaft gas generator
- Length: 83.5 in (2,120 mm)
- Diameter: 19.25 in (489 mm)
- Dry weight: 495 lb (225 kg)

==== Components ====
- Compressor: 12-stage axial flow
- Combustors: 5 tubular chambers
- Turbine: 2-stage
- Fuel type: Avtur or wide cut oil

==== Performance ====
- Maximum thrust: about 800 gas horsepower
- Overall pressure ratio: 6:1
- Air consumption: 9.9 lb/sec (4.5 kg/sec) plus 5.1 lb/sec (2.3 kg/sec) from auxiliary compressor
- Turbine inlet temperature: 400C output

== See also ==
- List of aircraft engines
- Turbomeca Palouste
