= Percival P.74 =

P.74
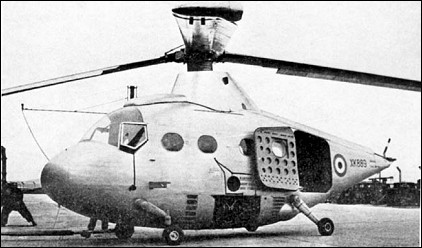
- Hunting Percival P.74 being readied for flight testing c. 1956

General information
- Type: Helicopter
- National origin: United Kingdom
- Manufacturer: Percival Aircraft Company
- Status: Cancelled 1956
- Number built: 1

The Percival P.74 (later Hunting Percival P.74) was a British experimental helicopter designed in the 1950s that was based on the use of tip-jet powered rotors. Although innovative, the tip-rotor concept literally failed to get off the ground in the P.74, doomed by its inadequate power source. Rather than being modified, the P.74 was towed off the airfield and scrapped.

== Design and development ==
In 1951, Percival Aircraft Company formed a helicopter division, and began design work on a medium-sized helicopter designated P.74. They designed the helicopter to meet Air Ministry Specification EH.125D issued in May 1952 for an experimental helicopter to test jet driven rotors. This experimental helicopter had a teardrop-shaped fuselage with a two-seat cockpit in the nose and a large cabin that ran the full length of the fuselage. Beneath the cabin floor, two Napier Oryx gas generators fed compressed air to the tips of the three rotor blades through triple ejector ducts. The rotor blades used ailerons on the trailing edges with pitch control achieved by a screw jack. The unusual engine location required that exhaust pipes pass through the cabin wall between the rows of seats. This created excessive noise and heat for intended passengers.

The lack of a gearbox and the simplified rotor coupling to the aircraft meant that the design could employ a tilting rotor hub, and did not need drag hinges. The low torque coupling at the mast meant that very little was needed in the form of lateral control. The P.74 rotor was expected to be quieter in operation than tip jets, following tests with a Derwent engine powered rotor. The stainless-steel rotors were thick in cross section to accommodate the necessary ducting to the tips. They also were non-feathering, so ailerons were fitted to the blades.

The P.74 prototype (designated the Hunting Percival P.74 after the company changedits name in 1954) was completed in the spring of 1956, and given the military serial number XK889. The final product looked decidedly ungainly, with a large bulbous fuselage that tapered to a tiny "tailcone" with an equally tiny tail rotor (deemed sufficient for control since there was no torque from the tip-rotors). The undercarriage consisted of four wheels on splayed-out stubs with castoring for the front two wheels. The large capacity of the P.74 was to show the possible commercial aspect.

A larger commercial variant, the 10-passenger Percival P.105, with stub wing mounted engines either side of the rotor mast was envisaged, and the P.74 was expected to offer information into the necessary ducting required hence the engine was mounted underneath the fuselage with ducts running up through the cabin.

== Testing and evaluation ==
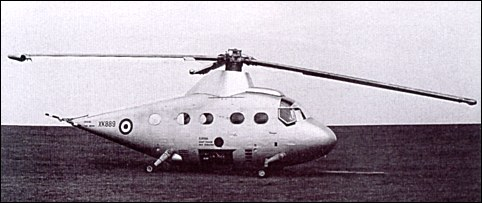
Hunting Percival P.74 c. 1956

Ground testing in a static rig commenced in 1956, but the Oryx engines failed to develop full power and maximum gas flow. Even with modifications to the power units, the first flight was aborted when the P.74 failed to fly. This may have been providential as there were no escape provisions for the two pilots. The only entrance door was located at the rear on the port side. The primary test pilot was famously quoted as saying the hapless P.74 had, "...the cockpit, flying controls and engine controls... designed without any input from a pilot."

The designers planned to fit a more powerful Rolls-Royce RB108 turbine, and a further development of a 10-passenger (P.105) variant was on the "drawing boards" when the nationalisation of the helicopter industry later that year resulted in the P.74 project being cancelled and the prototype scrapped.

== Variants ==
P.74
Experimental helicopter with a rotor powered by two Napier Oryx gas generators, one built but failed to fly and was scrapped.
P.104
Proposed variant with non-laminar-flow rotor blades, not built.
P.105
Proposed improved variant with the Oryx generators moved above the cabin, not built
P.113
Proposed improved variant of the P.74 with a Rolls-Royce RB108 engine and redesigned rotor system, not built.

== Specifications (P.74 as designed) ==
Data from Flight

General characteristics

- Crew: 2
- Capacity: 8 passengers
- Max takeoff weight: 7,750 lb (3,515 kg)
- Fuel capacity: 170 imp gal (770 L; 200 US gal)
- Powerplant: 2 × Napier NOr.1 Oryx single-shaft turbine gas generators, 750 hp (560 kW) each gas horse-power
- Main rotor diameter: 55 ft (17 m)

Performance

- Maximum speed: 110 mph (180 km/h, 96 kn)
- Cruise speed: 111 mph (178 km/h, 96 kn)
- Range: 330 mi (530 km, 290 nmi)
- Service ceiling: 27,985 ft (8,530 m)

== See also ==
- Fairey Rotodyne

Aircraft of comparable role, configuration, and era

- Fairey Jet Gyrodyne (jet tipped rotor driven at takeoff and landing only)
- Fiat 7002
- Hiller YH-32 Hornet
