= Sikorsky XH-39 =

US Army turbine-powered helicopter prototype

XH-39 (S-59)
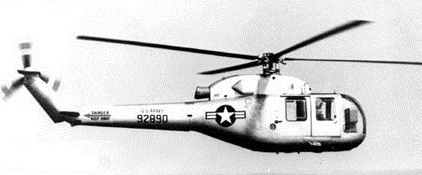
- Sikorsky XH-39

General information
- Type: Helicopter
- Manufacturer: Sikorsky Aircraft
- Primary user: United States Army
- Number built: 3

History
- Introduction date: not produced
- First flight: 26 August 1954
- Developed from: Sikorsky S-52

The Sikorsky XH-39 (manufacturer designation S-59), developed by Sikorsky Aircraft in 1954, is the U.S. Army's first turbine-powered helicopter. It was fast and innovative, but ultimately rejected by the United States Army in favor of the Bell UH-1 Iroquois.

== Design and development ==
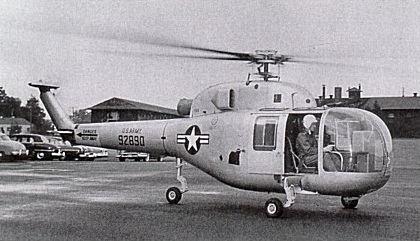
S-59 during runup

The four-seat XH-39 was powered by one Continental CAE XT51-T-3 400 shp (298 kW) turboshaft engine, a license-built development of the Turbomeca Artouste. It was developed from a previous Sikorsky model, the H-18 (company model S-52), and had the same layout. It differed in using retractable landing gear, modified tail rotor, and four-blade main rotor. In the end, the U.S. Army selected the Bell XH-40, prototype of the UH-1 Huey. Two YH-18As were modified into XH-39s; one for flight testing and the other for static test.

On 26 August 1954, the XH-39 set a world helicopter speed record of 156.005 mph (251 km/h) over a three kilometer closed course at Bradley Field (now Bradley International Airport) in Windsor Locks, Connecticut. The same year, on October 17, 1954, it set an unofficial world helicopter altitude record of 24,500 ft (7,474 m) at Bridgeport, Connecticut.

In addition to the two XH-39s, one S-59, serial number 52004, registration number N74150, was produced for use for company demonstration flights. It has been restored and is now on display at the New England Air Museum, Windsor Locks, Connecticut.

== Variants ==
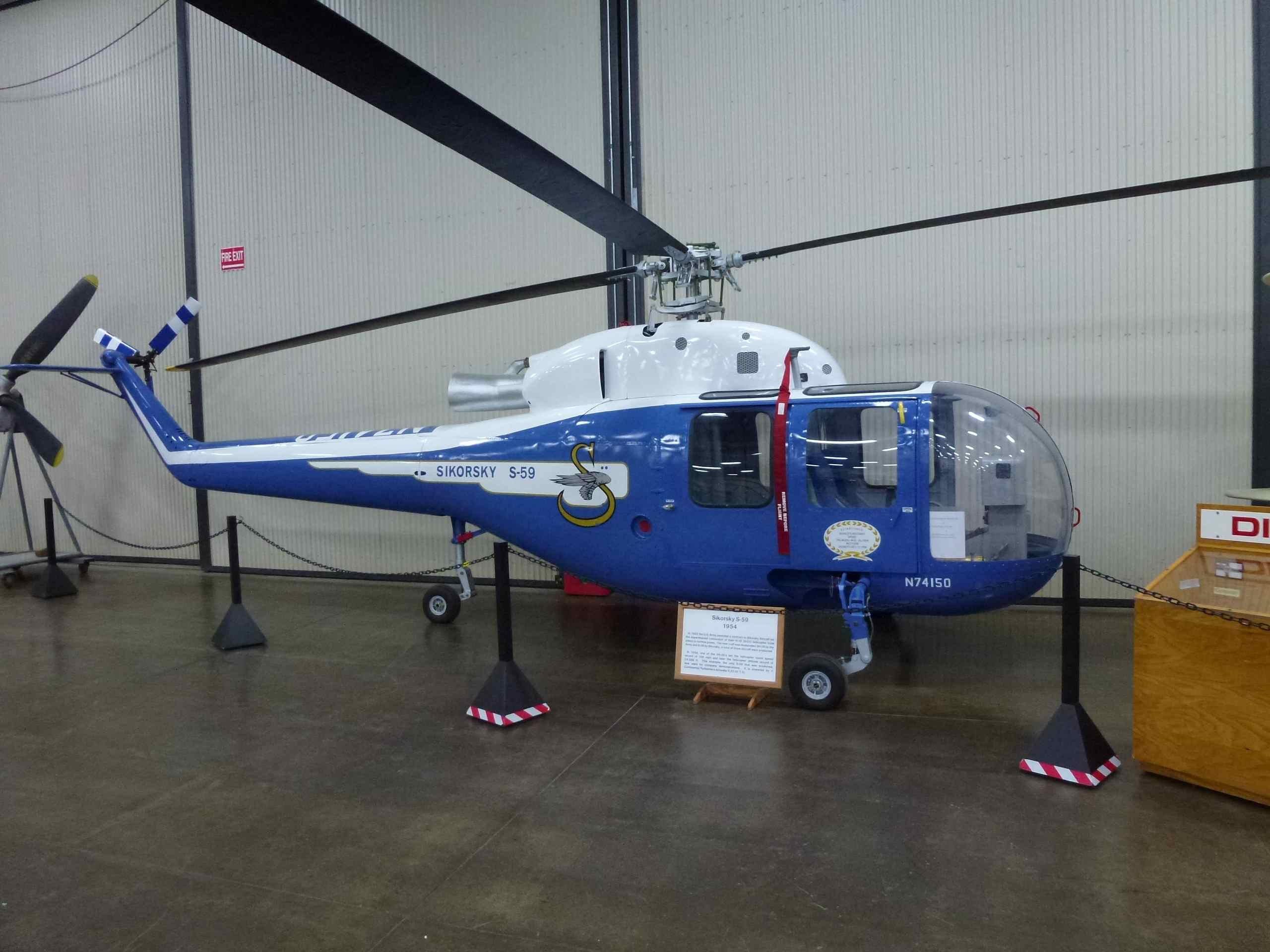
Sikorsky S-59 on display at the New England Air Museum

XH-39
Former YH-18A modified for static testing, not flown and later modified back to YH-18A standard.
XH-39A
Former YH-18A modified for flight testing.

== Specifications (XH-39) ==
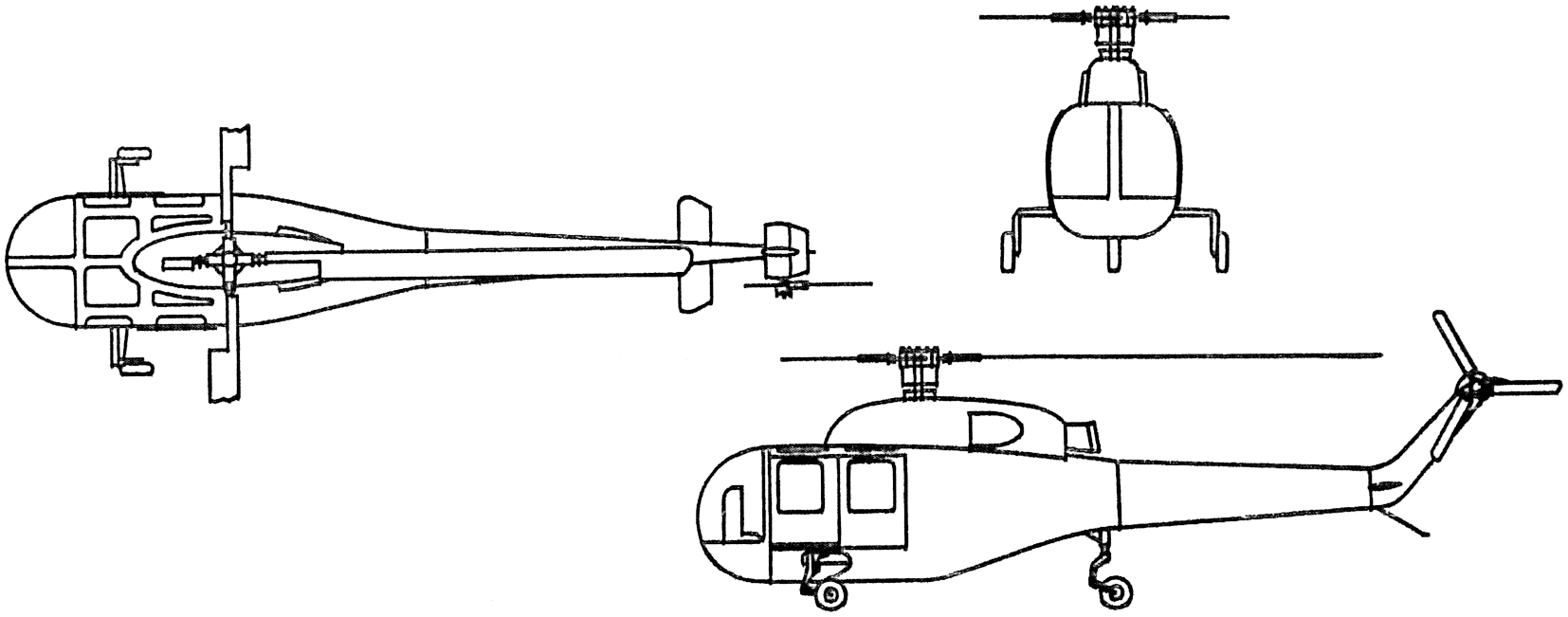
3-view line drawing of the Sikorsky XH-39

Data from U.S. Army Aircraft Since 1947

General characteristics

- Crew: One
- Capacity: 3 passengers
- Length: 41 ft 0 in (12.50 m)
- Height: 9 ft 7 in (2.92 m) (to top of rotor head)
- Empty weight: 2,105 lb (955 kg)
- Gross weight: 3,361 lb (1,525 kg)
- Powerplant: 1 × Continental CAE XT51-T-3 turboshaft, 400 shp (300 kW)
- Main rotor diameter: 35 ft 0 in (10.67 m)
- Main rotor area: 962 sq ft (89.4 m^{2})

Performance

- Maximum speed: 156 mph (251 km/h, 136 kn)
- Cruise speed: 138 mph (222 km/h, 120 kn)
- Range: 280 mi (450 km, 240 nmi)
- Service ceiling: 17,900 ft (5,500 m)

== See also ==
- Bell UH-1 Iroquois variants
- Bell Huey family
- U.S. helicopter armament subsystems

Related development

- Sikorsky S-52

Aircraft of comparable role, configuration, and era

- Bell XH-40

Related lists

- List of active United States military aircraft
- List of rotorcraft
