= Continental Motors =

Continental Motors may refer to:

- Continental Motors Company, a defunct American automobile engine manufacturer, and briefly a complete automobile manufacturer
- Continental Aerospace Technologies, formerly Teledyne Continental Motors, spun off from Continental Motors to produce aircraft engines, still operating
- Continental Aviation and Engineering, spun off to produce larger aircraft engines over 500 hp, today known as Teledyne Turbine Engines and organized as a division of the aircraft engine company above
