= Bell UH-1 Iroquois variants =

Variants of the American military utility helicopter

UH-1 Iroquois variants
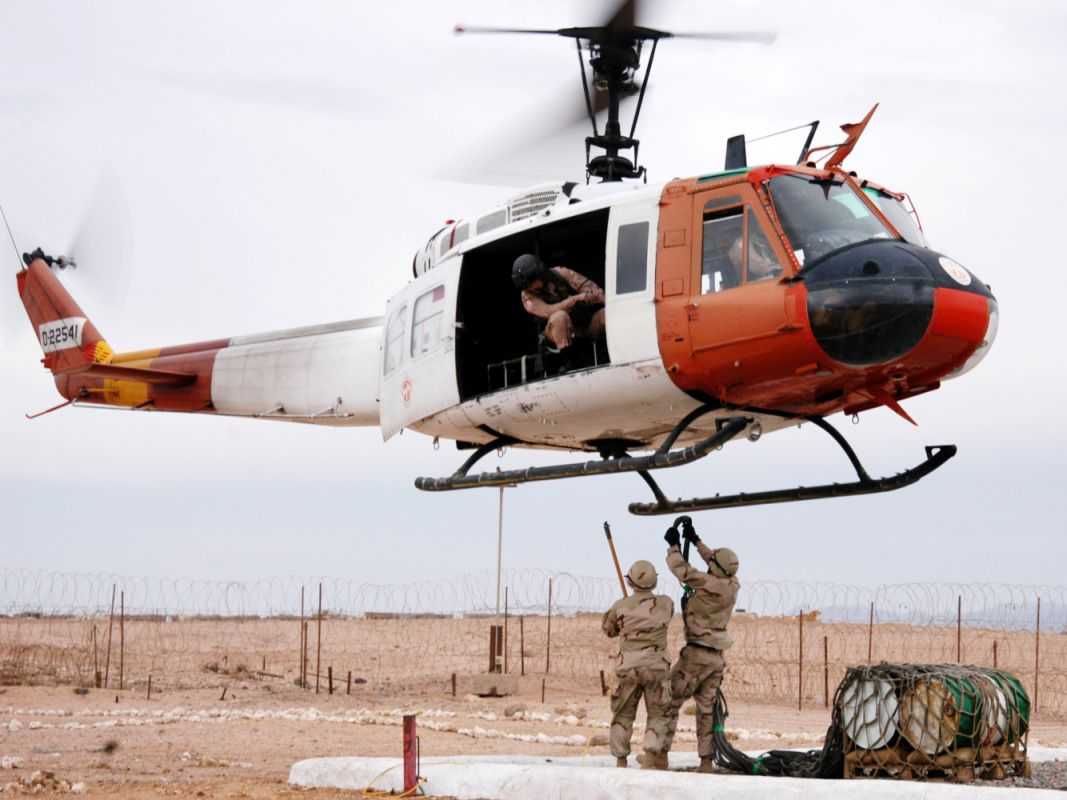
- Bell UH-1H Huey of the United States Army serving with the Multinational Force and Observers in Sinai, Egypt

General information
- Type: Military Helicopter
- National origin: United States
- Manufacturer: Bell Helicopter

History
- Introduction date: 1959

The Bell UH-1 Iroquois military helicopter, first introduced in 1959, is the first production member of Bell Helicopter's prolific Huey family of helicopters, and was itself developed in over twenty variants, which are listed below.

== XH-40 and YH-40 ==
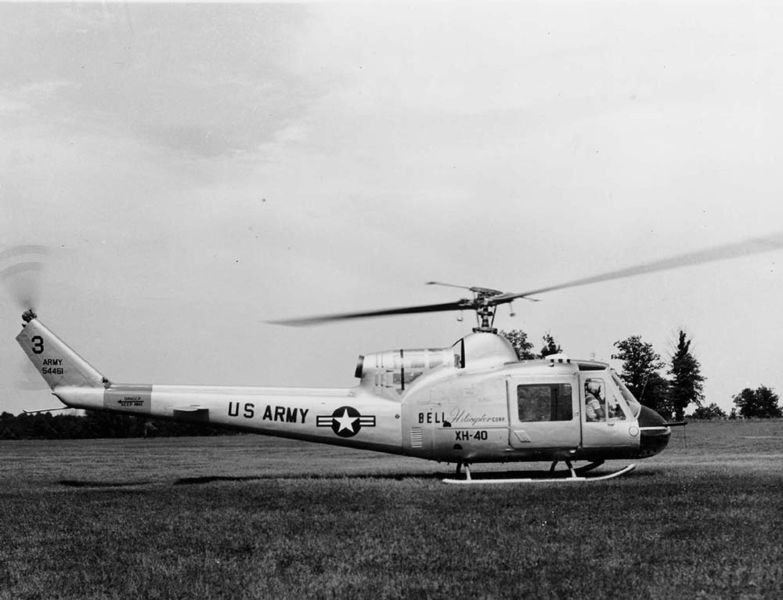
A Bell XH-40, a prototype of the UH-1

The first Bell helicopter to use a turbine engine was a modified Model 47 (designated XH-13F), which had its initial flight in October 1954. The U.S. Army began a competition for a new helicopter for general utility and medical/casualty evacuation in 1955. In June 1955, Bell Helicopter was awarded a contract to develop the next generation turbine-powered utility helicopter for the U.S. Army. The resulting Bell Model 204 was designated XH-40 by the U.S. military and first flew on 22 October 1956. Two more prototypes were built in 1957, and six YH-40 pre-production helicopters were delivered in 1958. The YH-40's cabin was lengthened by 12 in (30 cm), and had more ground clearance compared to the XH-40.

Bell believed the YH-40 was ideal for troop transport and cargo carrying as well as the medevac role, a view soon adopted by the Army; they found the pre-production aircraft so much better in service than previous piston-powered helicopters that they soon ordered more.

== UH-1A ==
The HU-1A (later redesignated the UH-1A) was the first turbine-equipped U.S. helicopter to go into production, and production models first entered service with the 101st Airborne Division at Fort Campbell, Kentucky, the 82nd Airborne Division and the 57th Medical Detachment. Although they were intended for evaluation only, the Army quickly pressed them into operational service and Hueys with the 57th Medical Detachment arrived in South Vietnam in March 1962.

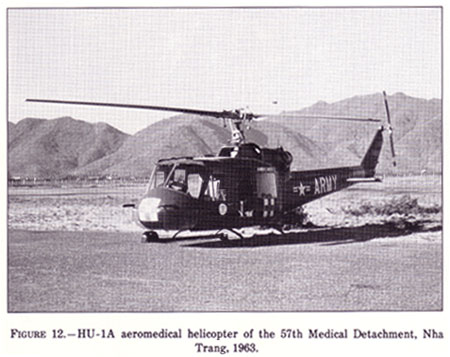
An HU-1A of the 57th Medical Detachment (Helicopter Ambulance) at Nha Trang in 1963

The helicopter was originally designated the HU-1A, which is where it received its nickname - "Huey." The official U.S. Army designation Iroquois (Army helicopters are traditionally given Native American names) was almost never used in practice.

Fourteen of the original order of UH-1As were designated as TH-1A which were used for crew training and a single aircraft was redesignated XH-1A for grenade launcher testing in 1960.

The first UH-1As to arrive in Vietnam after the 57th Medical Detachment were with a new test unit, the US Army's Utility Tactical Transport Company (UTTCO). UTTCO had 20 "Alpha" Hueys and deployed to Vietnam in the fall of 1962. These aircraft were used as armed escorts to the existing H-21 Shawnees and H-34 Choctaws troop carriers.

In use the UH-1A proved under-powered with their Lycoming T53-L-1 powerplants of just 860 shp and indicated the need for improved follow-on models of the Huey.

== UH-1B ==
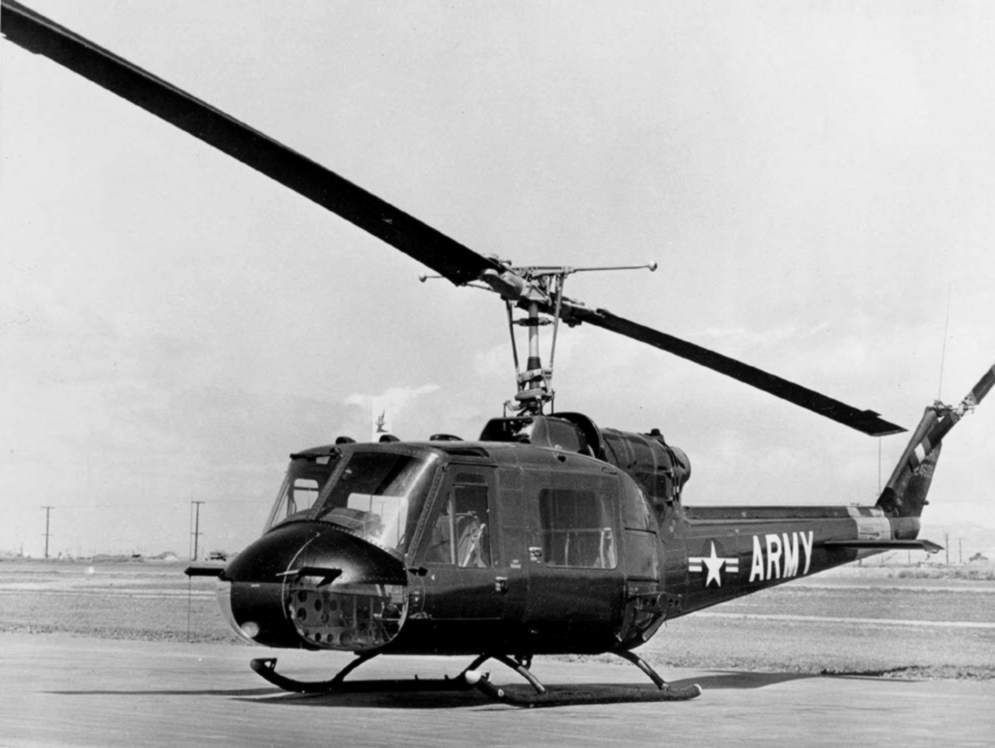
UH-1B

The HU-1B was an improved model that was equipped with the Lycoming T53-L-5 engine of 960 shp (720 kW), revised main rotor blades of 44-foot (13 m) diameter and 21-inch (530 mm) chord, 13 inch higher rotor mast and a longer cabin that could accommodate seven passengers. This version was redesignated UH-1B in 1962.

Later production UH-1Bs were equipped with Lycoming T53-L-9 and L-11 engines of 1,100 shp (820 kW). Gross weight was 8,500 lb (3,900 kg) and the standard empty weight was 4,513 lb (2,047 kg).

Army testing of the "B" model started in November 1960 with first production aircraft arriving in March 1961. A total of 1010 "Bravo" models were delivered to the US Army. First deployment was in November 1963 when eleven were sent to Vietnam to join the "Alpha" models already in use by UTTCO.

One NUH-1B was produced for test purposes.

Bell certified a civil version of the UH-1B incorporating some minor safety improvements, such as improved door locks. The aircraft was marketed as the Bell 204B.

Later on as the "long cabin" Hueys supplanted the Bravo in the transport role, the UH-1B became increasingly used in a "gunship" role equipped with machine guns and rockets. However, it had insufficient power to maintain full capability when used with the heaviest armament subsystems, leading to the UH-1C.

== UH-1C ==
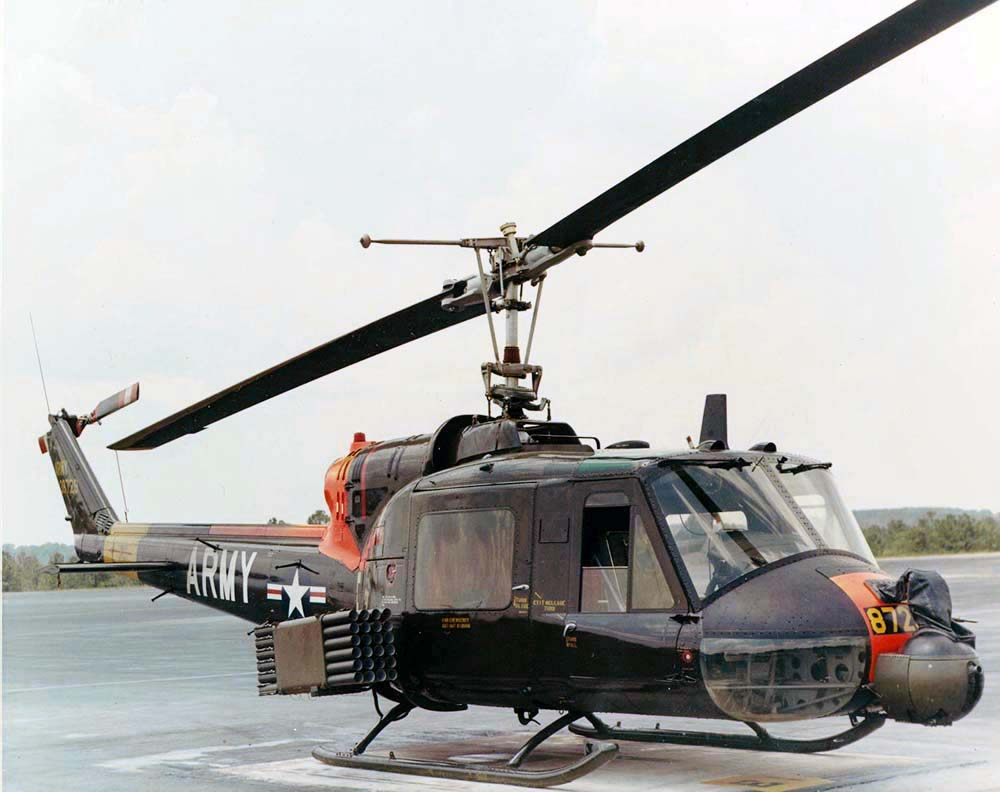
UH-1C with rockets and turret

The UH-1C was specifically developed as a gunship version until the "interim" attack helicopter, the Bell AH-1G Huey Cobra, was available and to correct the deficiencies of the UH-1B when it was used in the armed role. The UH-1C was widely referred to as the "Huey Hog" in US Army service.

The "Charlie" model was fitted with the 1,100 shp (820 kW) T53-L-9 or L-11 engine to provide the power needed to lift the weapons systems in use or under development at the time. It incorporated the new Bell 540 rotor system with 27-inch (690 mm) chord blades. The increased power lead Bell's engineers to design a new tailboom for the "C" which incorporated a wider chord fin on a longer boom and larger synchronized elevators. The "C" also introduced a dual hydraulic control system for redundancy in battle and an improved inlet filter system for the dusty conditions found in southeast Asia. Fuel was increased to 242 US gallons and gross weight to 9,500 lb (4,300 kg), giving a nominal useful load of 4,673 lb (2,120 kg).

Development on the "C" model had commenced in 1960, with production starting in June 1966. A total of 766 "C" models were completed, including five for the Royal Australian Navy and five for Norway. The balance went to the US Army.

Many UH-1Cs were later re-engined with the 1,400 shp (1,000 kW) Lycoming T53-L-13 powerplant. With this engine they were redesignated UH-1M.

== UH-1D ==
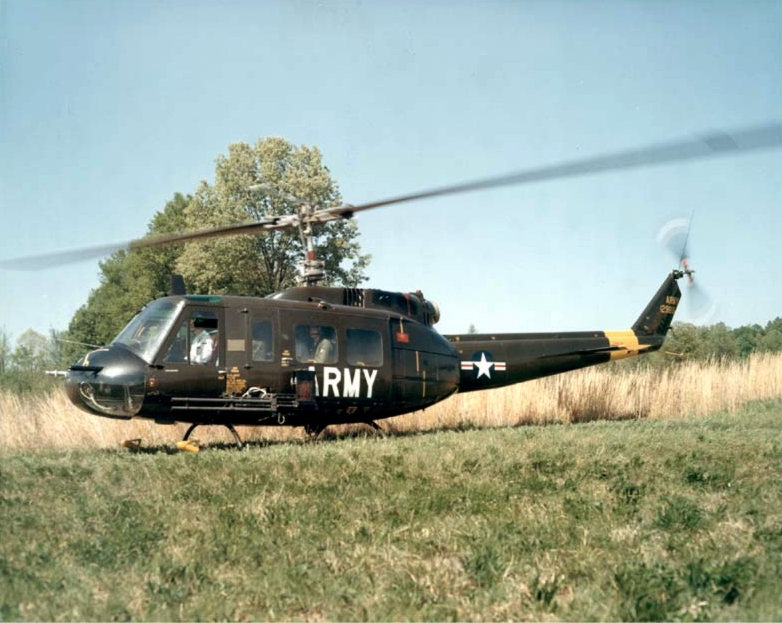
UH-1D

The earlier "short-body" Hueys were a success, especially in the gunship role, but lacked the cabin space to be an effective troop transport. The US Army wanted a version that could carry a crew of four (two pilots and two door gunners) and also deliver an infantry section of eight to ten soldiers. Bell's solution was to stretch the UH-1B fuselage by 41 inches (105 cm) and use the extra space to fit two sideways-facing seats on either side of the transmission. This brought the total seating capacity to 15, including crew seats.

The new Huey was designated UH-1D by the US Army and as the Model 205 by Bell. The enlarged cabin could also accommodate six stretchers, double that of the earlier models, making the "Delta" a good MEDEVAC aircraft. In place of the earlier model's sliding side doors with a single window, larger doors were fitted which had two windows, plus a small "hinged panel" with an optional window, providing access to the cabin. The doors and hinged panels were quickly removable and the Huey could be flown in that configuration.

The first YUH-1D prototype flew in August 1960. Seven YUH-1Ds were delivered and tested at Edwards AFB starting in March 1961. The YUH-1D was initially equipped with a 44 ft (13 m) main rotor and a Lycoming T53-L-9 engine. Testing revealed that more power was required and so the rotor was lengthened to 48 ft (15 m) with a chord of 21 inches (530 mm) and the engine was upgraded to the Lycoming T53-L-11 engine of 1,100 shp (820 kW). A longer tailboom was designed to accommodate the longer rotor blades. Gross weight was 9,500 lb (4,300 kg). Later production "Deltas" had the Lycoming T53-L-13 powerplant of 1,400 shp (1,000 kW) installed and redesignated as "Hotel" models.

The first Army unit deliveries of the "Delta" model were on 9 August 1963 when the 11th Air Assault Division (Test) at Fort Benning Georgia received two. This unit was renamed the 1st Cavalry Division and deployed to Vietnam with its "Delta" Hueys.

A total of 2,008 UH-1Ds were delivered to the US Army between 1962 and 1966. The model was widely exported and served with the armed forces of Australia and South Vietnam among others. A grand total of 2,561 UH-1Ds were built, including 352 constructed by Dornier for the West German armed forces.

The HH-1D was a base rescue/fire-fighting version for the US Army that had a 50-gallon water and foam spray system that could be discharged via an extendable 16-foot (4.9 m) boom.

Upgrading the UH-1D to the Lycoming T53-L-13 engine, plus relocating the pitot tube from the nose to the roof resulted in a new model, the UH-1H, which was to become the most produced variant of the Huey family.

== UH-1E ==
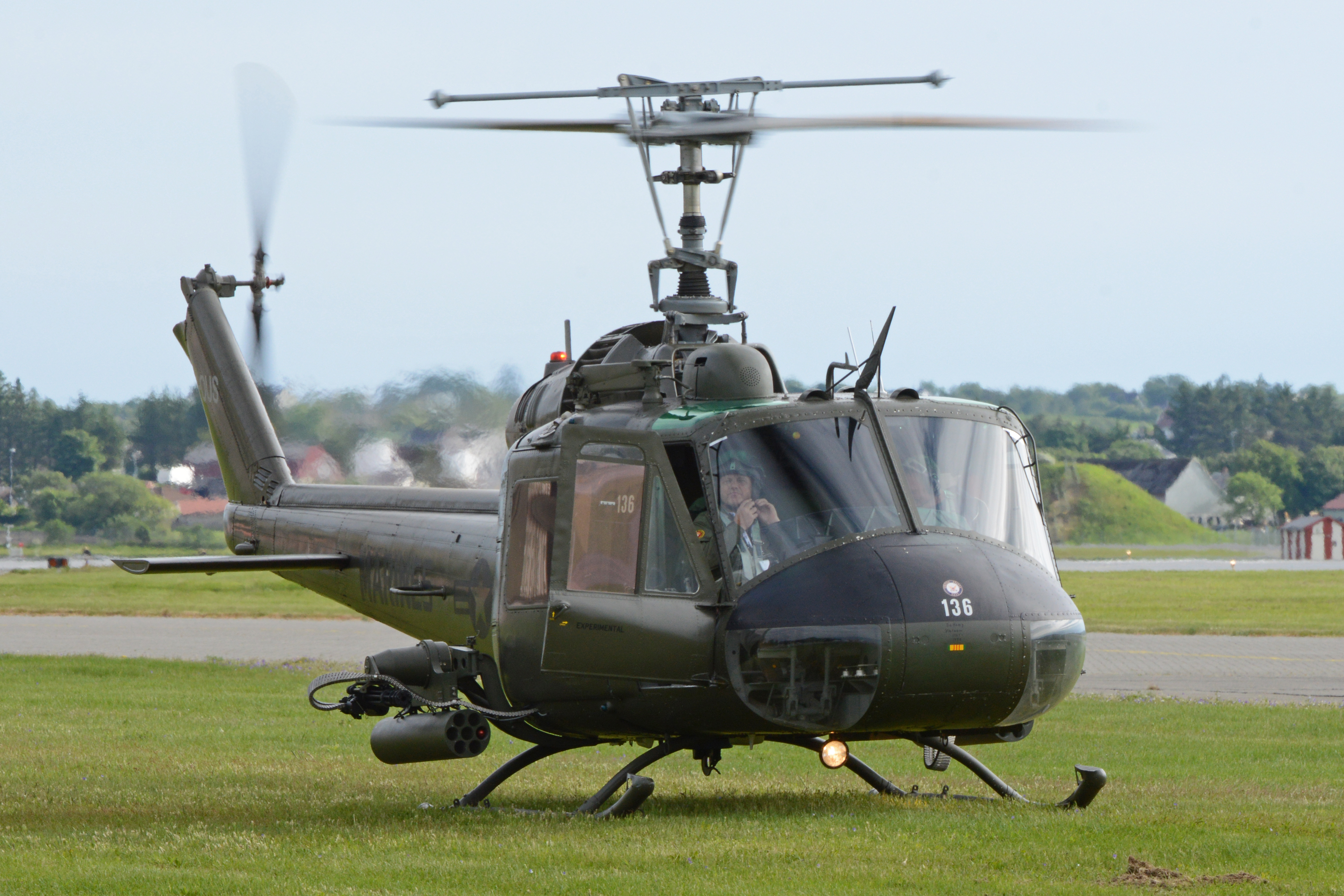
UH-1E

In 1962 the US Marines held a competition to choose a new assault support helicopter to replace the Cessna O-1 and Kaman OH-43D helicopter. The winner was the UH-1B which was already then in service with the US Army.

The UH-1B was developed into a special model, designated UH-1E, to meet Marine Corps requirements. The major changes included the use of all-aluminum construction for corrosion resistance (earlier UH-1s had some magnesium components), special avionics that were compatible with Marine Corps ground frequencies, a rotor brake to stop the rotor quickly on shutdown for shipboard use and a roof-mounted rescue hoist.

The UH-1E was first flown on 7 October 1963 and deliveries commenced 21 February 1964, with 192 aircraft completed. Due to production line realities at Bell the UH-1E was produced in two different versions, both with the same UH-1E designation. The first 34 built were essentially UH-1B airframes with the Lycoming T53-L-11 of 1,100 shp (820 kW). Because Bell was switching Army production to the UH-1C the UH-1E production line was converted to commonality with the "C". This meant the later "Echo" Hueys were completed with the "Charlie" style tailboom including the larger fin, the 540 rotor system and a gross weight of 8,500 lb (3,900 kg).

The Marines used the UH-1E as both a gunship and troop transport. Many were upgraded to the Lycoming T53-L-13 engine which produced 1,400 shp (1,000 kW), making these "Echos" similar to the Army "Mike" models. At least 126 UH-1Es survived their Vietnam service and were still in use more than a decade later.

There was a Marine Corps training version of the UH-1E, which was based on the UH-1C variant and was designated TH-1E. Twenty were delivered in 1965.

== UH-1F ==
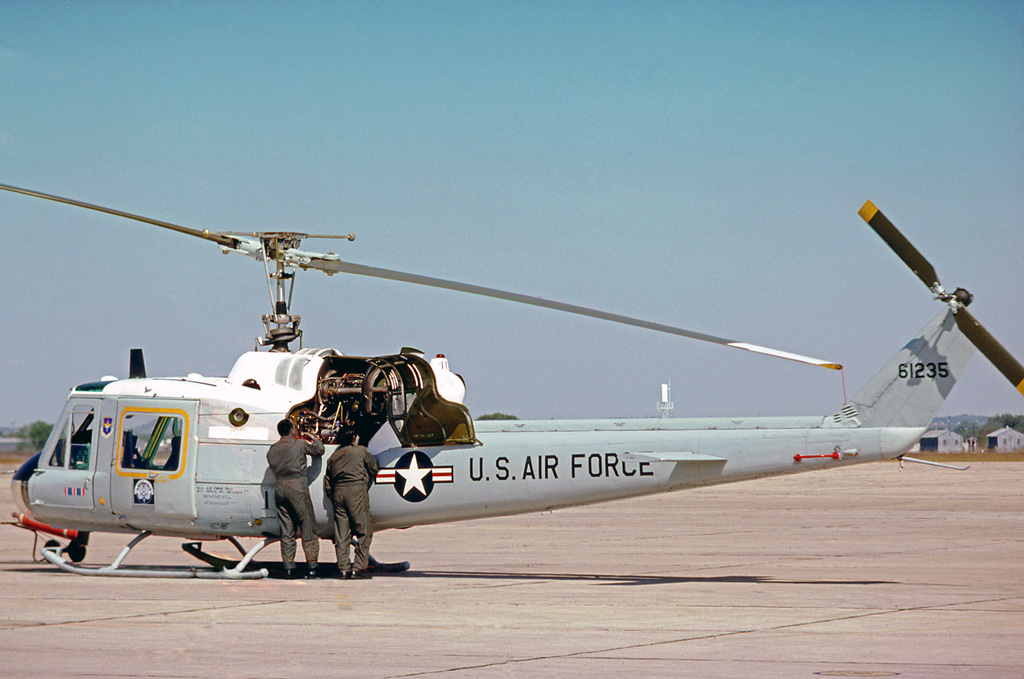
TH-1F training helicopter of the USAF Instrument Flight Center in 1975

Bell Helicopters was the winner of a 1963 United States Air Force competition for a support helicopter for use on its missile bases.

Bell had proposed the UH-1B for the competition but the USAF asked Bell to develop a special version of the "Bravo" in using the General Electric T58 turboshaft as a powerplant. The USAF already had a large inventory of these engines for its fleet of Sikorsky HH-3 Jolly Green Giant rescue helicopters and wanted to have commonality between the types. This engine was capable of 1,250 hp (932 kW) compared to the UH-1B's 1,100 hp (820 kW) T53-L11.

In response Bell proposed an upgraded version of the UH-1B with the T58 engine installed. The resulting UH-1F had the shorter cabin of the "Bravo" Huey, but with the longer tail boom, rotor and transmission of the UH-1D.

Due to the Huey's configuration, Bell installed the T58 engine backwards compared to the HH-3. The Huey's engine is behind the transmission, whereas the HH-3's engines are in front of the transmission. Externally, the only visible differences from UH-1B were the engine exhaust, which exited to the right side of the engine and the longer tail boom.

The UH-1F was introduced into the USAF inventory on 20 February 1964. The USAF took delivery of 119 with production ending in 1967. Many of the aircraft served in southeast Asia with the 20th Special Operations Squadron and some were converted to the armed UH-1P configuration.

In Italy, Agusta produced a similar model by re-engining the 204B with the 1,225 hp (914 kW) Rolls-Royce Gnome (license-built T58) turboshaft, but later models used T58s. The AB204B was exported to the military of the Netherlands, Sweden, Austria, and Switzerland. It had a rescue hoist located at the right side of the cabin.

The last UH-1F was retired from the USAF in the early 1980s when it was replaced by the air rescue version of the UH-1H which itself was replaced by the air rescue versions of the UH-1N in the mid-1990s. Many of these aircraft later served as forest fire fighting aircraft with various US state governments and agencies.

There was a TH-1F trainer also built for the USAF. The first TH-1F was flown in January 1967 and deliveries ran from April to July of that year with 27 completed. Examples of this variant were operated by the USAF Instrument Flight Center.

== UH-1H ==
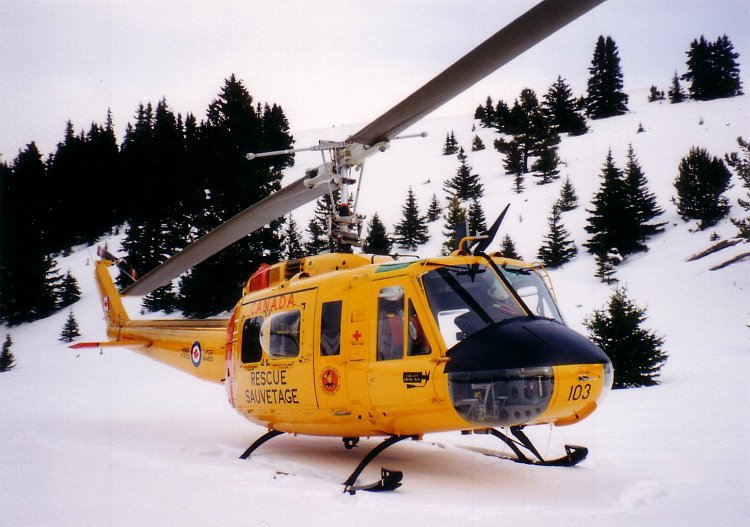
A Canadian CH-118 with 417 Squadron in the Rocky Mountains of British Columbia, January 1992

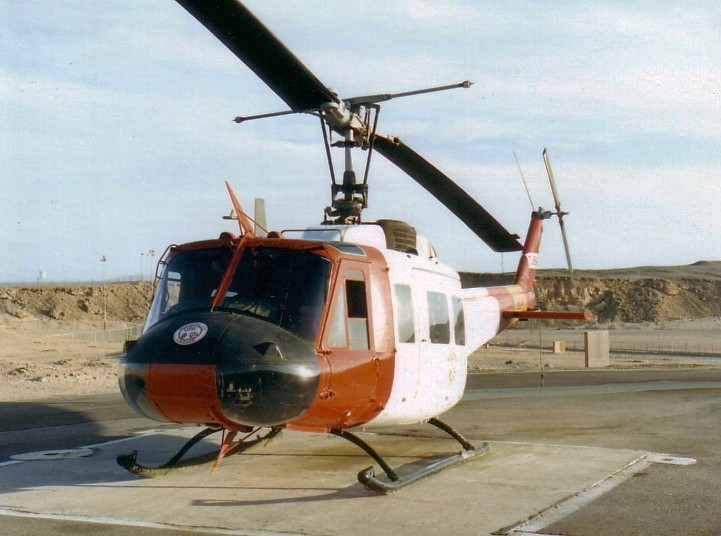
A US Army UH-1H serving with the Multinational Force and Observers South Camp, Naama Bay, Sinai, Egypt, 1989

The UH-1H was an improved UH-1D, with the Lycoming T53-L-13 engine of 1,400 shp (1,000 kW) installed, plus the pitot tube relocated from the nose to the roof, to reduce ground damage to it. "Hotel" models were created by upgrading "Deltas" with the more powerful engine. The first YUH-1H flew in 1966 with deliveries of production models starting in September 1967.

The "Hotel" model Huey was produced in larger numbers than any other model, with 4,850 delivered to the US Army alone. The "Hotel" model was widely exported and was also built under license in Germany, Italy, Japan, and Taiwan.

Ten were sold to Canada for use under the designation CUH-1H with the first one delivered on 6 March 1968. These were evaluated by the Canadian Forces and found unsuitable for Canadian tactical use, which resulted in the Canadian government sponsoring the development of the twin-engined version of the "Hotel", the UH-1N Twin Huey. The ten CUH-1Hs were re-equipped for search and rescue use, redesignated CH-118 and served until 1995.

Bell developed a certified version of the UH-1H for the civil market. The aircraft incorporated minor changes for safety, such as dual sliding door locks and a baggage compartment in the tailboom. It was marketed by Bell as the Model 205A and later the improved 205A-1.

The "Hotel" model Huey was also the basis for a number of sub-variants:

- HH-1H was a UH-1H equipped for base rescue duties. Thirty were delivered to the USAF between 1970 and 1973.
- EH-1H was a UH-1H modified under Project Quick Fix in 1976 and used as communications jamming aircraft with the US Army. Twenty-two aircraft were modified to this configuration beginning in 1976. Initial aircraft were fielded to the 82nd Airborne Division and the 2nd Armored Division. The 82nd fielded the type during the invasion of Grenada (Operation Urgent Fury) in 1983.
- UH-1J an improved Japanese version of the UH-1H built under license in Japan by Fuji Heavy Industries. It was locally designated as the UH-1J.
- EH-1X was an improved EH-1H communications jammer and DF aircraft.
- JUH-1 was a UH-1H equipped with retractable skid gear and an AN/APS 94 radar boom mounted on the belly.
- UH-1V was a MEDEVAC version of the "Hotel", with upgraded avionics.
- TH-1H: Modified UH-1Hs for use as basic helicopter flight trainers by the USAF.

A UAV version of UH-1H is being developed by Aurora Flight Sciences using the Tactical Autonomous Aerial Logistics System platform for the Autonomous Aerial Cargo Utility System (AACUS) program.

The Bell Huey II is a re-manufactured, modified and re-engined military UH-1H, including an Allison T53-L-703 turboshaft engine of 1,800 shp (1,343 kW), a vibration-reduction system, infrared countermeasures and a night-vision-goggle (NVG) compatible cockpit. Currently offered by Bell.

== UH-1J ==
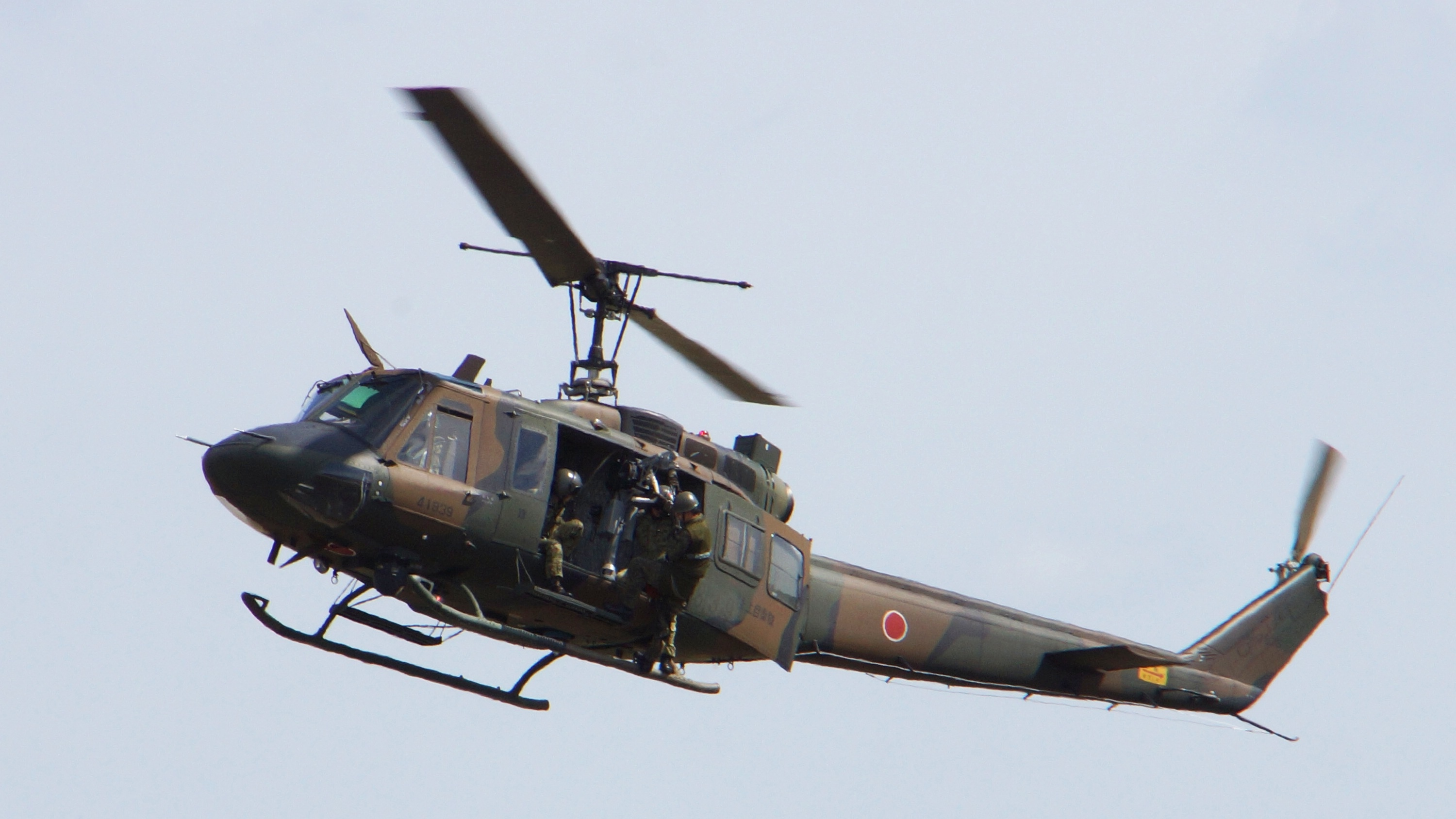
UH-1J of the Japan Ground Self-Defense Force

Some UH-1Hs built by Fuji in Japan for the Japan Ground Self-Defense Force were improved and given the local designation of UH-1J, although this was not used in the US designation series. It has an upgraded engine and a UH-1N nose.

Japan's UH-1H and UH-1Js will be replaced by a military version of the Bell 412.

== HH-1K ==
Bell was awarded a contract by the US Navy in December 1968 for a new search and rescue helicopter. The aircraft was designated the HH-1K and was basically a UH-1E with different avionics and the Lycoming T53-L-13 powerplant of 1,400 shp (1,000 kW).

Deliveries of the “Kilo” Huey started in May 1970 and by November of that year three had been sent to Vietnam to serve with US Navy squadron HA(L)-3 and, later with the HA(L)-4 Red Wolves and the HA(L)-5 Blue Hawks. A total of 27 HH-1Ks were produced.

In late 1982 the US Navy dedicated one of its HH-1Ks to the MA-257 Export Leader, a modified container ship to support testing of the then unproven Arapaho Containerized Aircraft Handling System. During these trials, the HH-1K took part in day landings, some of which may have been made simultaneously with other helicopters. Across all models, the helicopters achieved a total of 178 day and 45 night landings. While the trials were successful, the Navy eventually decided not to set the system into production.

== UH-1L ==
With deliveries of the UH-1E underway to the US Marines the US Navy tested a few and found that the type would suit their uses as a utility helicopter. On 16 May 1968, the US Navy ordered eight aircraft under the designation UH-1L.

The “Lima” Huey was basically a UH-1E, of the later production type based on the Army's UH-1C, equipped with a rescue hoist and intake particle screen. The “Ls” were delivered without the armor or armament installed and were equipped with the Lycoming T53-L-13 powerplant of 1,400 shp (1,000 kW).

The first four “Limas” were delivered in November 1969 and sent to Vietnam to equip the US Navy HA(L)-3 detachment assigned to Operation Sealords. In Vietnam the aircraft were modified with weapons and armor and were fitted to carry 500 lb (230 kg) bombs and 500 lb (230 kg) Fuel-Air Explosive munitions.

There was a TH-1L version of the UH-1L for the Navy to replace the H-34 and the borrowed Army UH-1Ds used in the training role, including for pilot aircraft carrier qualification training. Forty-five TH-1Ls were delivered starting in November 1969.

== UH-1M ==
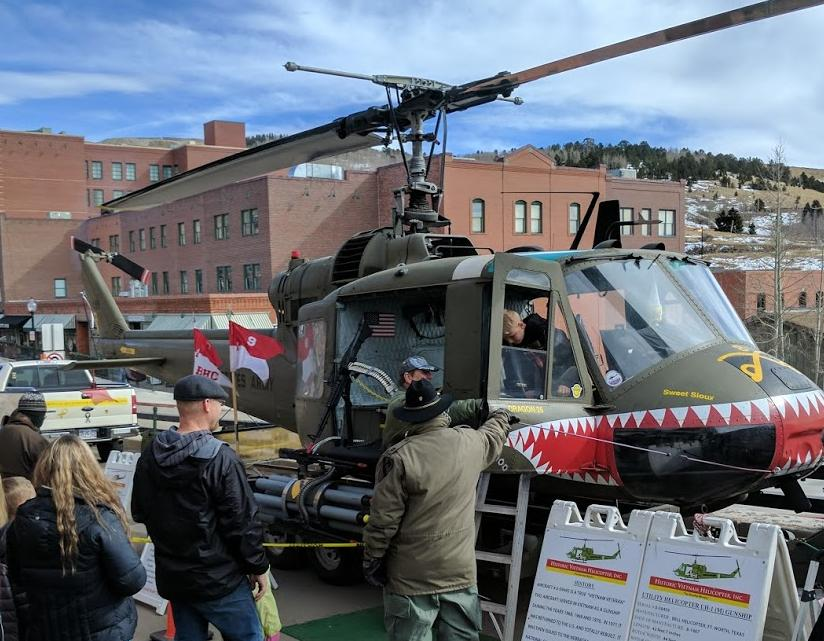
Bell UH-1M helicopter on a trailer being displayed in Cripple Creek, Colorado.

The "Mike" model Huey was a conversion of the existing UH-1C by re-engining it with the 1,400 shp (1,000 kW) Lycoming T53-L-13 powerplant used in the UH-1H. This provided more power to the "C" model for its role as a gunship and also provided engine commonality between the attack and transport helicopters in use in Vietnam at that time.

== UH-1N ==
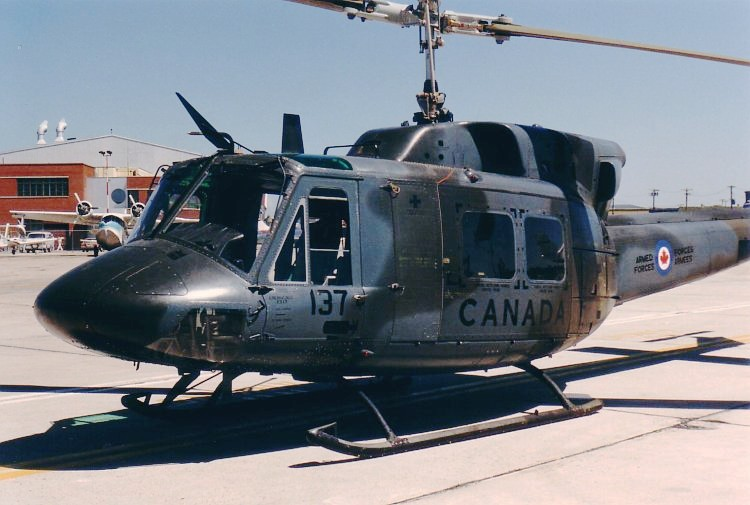
Canadian Forces CH-135 Twin Huey, 1987

Bell flew the first twin-engined Huey in April 1965, calling it the Model 208. It was powered by a Continental XT67 twin-pack engine module. The Canadian government provided the incentive for Bell to continue development of the Twin Huey using Pratt & Whitney Canada PT6T twin-pack engine. The project attracted orders from the Canadian Forces, US Marine Corps, US Navy and USAF, but not the US Army.

The new aircraft was designated UH-1N Iroquois in US service and CUH-1N Twin Huey in Canadian Forces use. The Canadian designation was later changed to CH-135 Twin Huey. There was an HH-1N version produced for the USAF as a base rescue helicopter and for use by the 20th Special Operations Squadron in the counter-insurgency role using the call sign Green Hornet. Some Marine Corps UH-1Ns were converted to VH-1Ns as VIP transports, including six for presidential use.

The UH-1N was widely produced and exported to a large number of countries and license-built by Agusta in Italy. Bell certified a civil version as the Model 212 in October 1970.

== UH-1P ==
A total of twenty UH-1Fs were modified to UH-1P configuration by the USAF for use by their 20th Special Operations Squadron, Callsign "Green Hornets" based in southeast Asia during the Vietnam War.

Official USAF sources state that these aircraft were used for classified psychological warfare role, which is correct to the extent that the "slick" versions of these A/Cs were used to covertly infiltrate/exfiltrate US Special Operations Forces (SOF) RECON and Hatchet teams, often conducting PSYOPS missions primarily into/out of Cambodia and occasionally Laos. The "gunship" versions were in fact modified and armed with two skid mounted 7.62mm miniguns each capable of firing up 6,000 rounds/minute and pod mounted rocket launchers firing 2.75 in. high explosive/fragmentation rounds.

== UH-1V ==
The UH-1V is a version of the UH-1H converted by the US Army Electronics Command for MEDEVAC use. The aircraft have several upgrades including a radar altimeter, DME, ILS and a rescue hoist. The first aircraft were supplied to the New Hampshire National Guard.

== EH-1X ==
The EH-1X was an improved EH-1H that was equipped with the AN/ALQ-151 system and configured for the airborne jamming, radio intercept and DF role. Ten EH-1Xs were built starting in late 1976 under Project Quick Fix IIA.

== JUH-1 SOTAS ==
The JUH-1 was a modified UH-1H an AN/APS 94 radar system mounted in a rotating boom on the belly, where the cargo hook had been. The aircraft's skid landing gear was modified to retract allowing the radar antennae to rotate while in flight. The JUH-1s also incorporated an autopilot and improved navigation avionics. The radar system was connected by datalink to a ground station for analysis of the radar images.

At least four UH-1Hs were modified to JUH-1s for use by the US Army in Europe and Korea for use as technology demonstrators in the Stand Off Target Acquisition System (SOTAS) program. They were first deployed in 1975 but by 1986 they had been replaced by the EH-60 Black Hawk.

== UH-1Y ==
The UH-1Y Venom is an upgraded UH-1N Twin Huey for the US Marines that was first flown on 18 November 2006, developed as part of the H-1 upgrade program.

== See also ==
- List of military electronics of the United States
