= Bell 201 =

Experimental helicopter by Bell

Bell 201/XH-13F
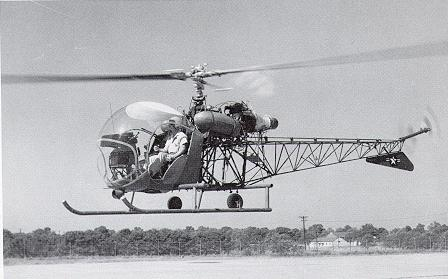
- Bell 201/XH-13F in a hover

General information
- Type: Experimental helicopter
- National origin: United States
- Manufacturer: Bell Aircraft
- Primary users: United States Army United States Air Force
- Number built: 1

History
- First flight: 20 October 1954
- Developed from: Bell 47

The Bell Model 201 (military designation XH-13F) was created using a modified Model 47G and was the first Bell helicopter to use a turbine engine.

== History ==
Built at the beginning of 1955 as part of a joint Army/USAF research program, the Model 201 was used to test component for the new XH-40, the prototype for the UH-1 Iroquois. It took to the sky on October 20, 1954, with test pilot Bill Quinlan at the controls. The project engineer for this joint Army/USAF research program was J. R. "Bob" Duppstadt. A license-built development of the French 280-shp Turbomeca Artouste I turboshaft, known as the Continental CAE XT51-T-3, powered the XH-13F. This engine produced 425 shp (317 kW), yet it weighed so little that it had to be mounted behind the helicopter's fuel tanks and rotor mast for weight-and-balance reasons.

The light weight of turbines made them ideal for helicopters, whose performance had long been constrained by the low power-to-weight ratios of piston engines. Turbine power also promised greater reliability and lower maintenance costs. Their drawbacks were higher fuel consumption and a significantly higher purchase price. The latter would limit civil market sales far more than those to the military. Putting a premium on performance and having public funds at their disposal, the world's armed services wholeheartedly embraced turbine power. Pleased with the prototype during its Phase I (factory) testing, Quinlan called the XH-13F the "smoothest Model 47 ever built". At the start of April 1955, the prototype was handed over to usaf Major Jones P. Seigler and First Lieutenant Donald A. Wooley. The two officers, attached to Edwards Air Force Base in California, conducted the Phase II test program at Fort Worth to ensure good coordination with Bell.

== Specifications ==
Data from International Directory of Civil Aircraft

General characteristics

- Crew: 1 or 2
- Capacity: 1 passenger
- Length: 31 ft 7 in (9.63 m)
- Wingspan: 37 ft 2 in (11.33 m)
- Height: 9 ft 3 in (2.82 m)
- Powerplant: 1 × Continental XT51-T-3 turboshaft, 425 hp (317 kW)
- Main rotor diameter: 37 ft 2 in (11.33 m)
- Main rotor area: 1,085 sq ft (100.8 m^{2})

Performance

== See also ==
Related development

- Bell 47
- Bell 207
- Bell XH-40

Aircraft of comparable role, configuration, and era

- Aérospatiale Alouette II

Related lists

- List of military aircraft of the United States
