= Teledyne LJ95 =

Small lift turbojet engine

Teledyne CAE LJ95
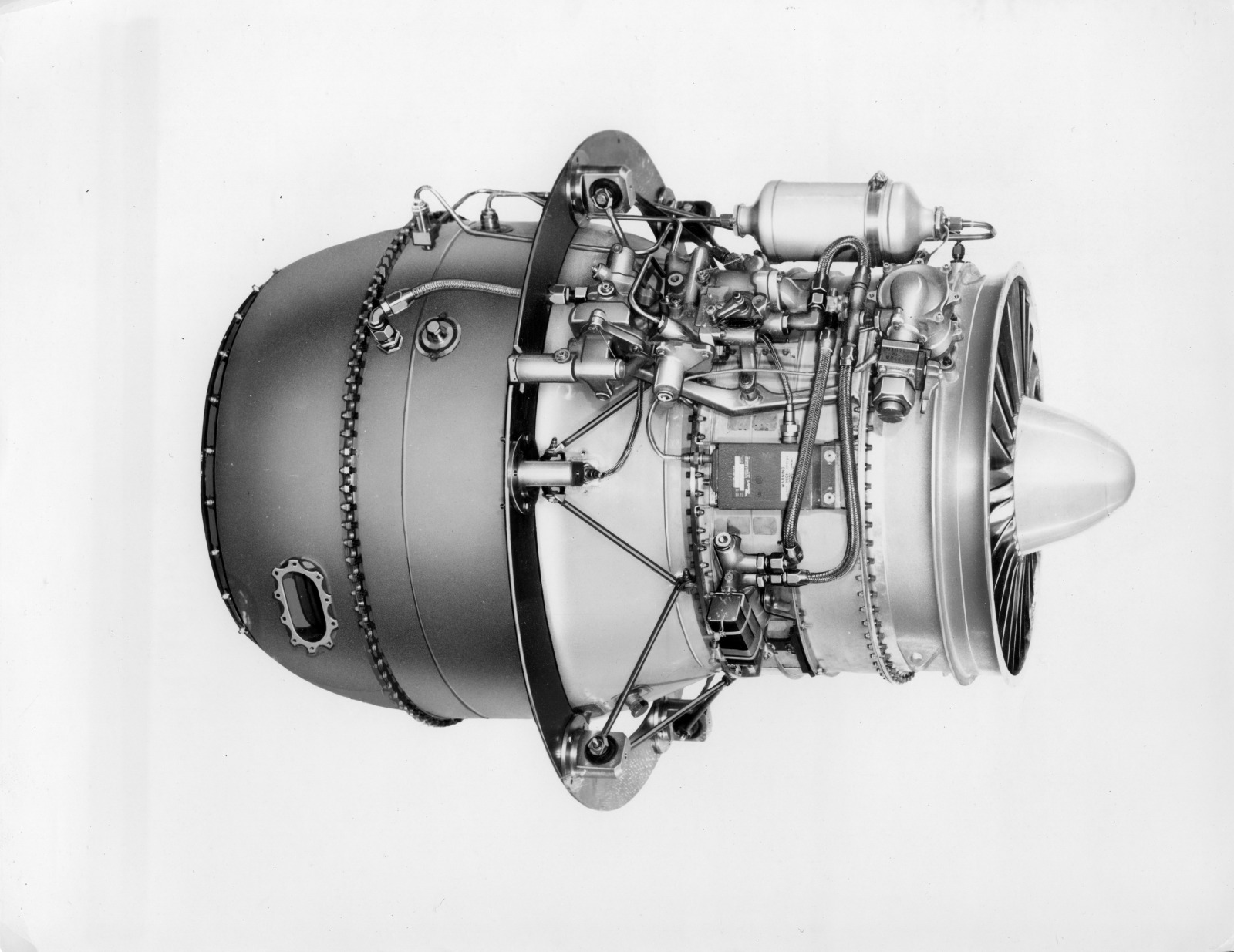
- Type: turbojet lift engine
- National origin: US
- Manufacturer: Teledyne Turbine Engines

The Teledyne CAE LJ95 (company designation: CAE 365) was a lift jet built by Teledyne Turbine Engines (then known as CAE and later Teledyne CAE) in the 1960s.

== Development ==
In 1961, Eli Benstein, Doug Oliver, and Marvin Bennett were assigned to go get some new business. To meet NATO requirements, Teledyne opted for the separate lift jet approach, and it conceived a high-thrust lift turbojet with a thrust/weight ratio of 20:1. An experimental lift jet engine (with a thrust/weight ratio of 12:1) built by CAE made use of lightweight materials and design techniques and operated horizontally.

After CAE's first lift jet tests, the USAF held a competition for a lightweight lift jet engine, and CAE, Pratt & Whitney, and General Electric competed for this contract. CAE was declared the winner, and in 1962 it was awarded a contract to develop and test a lift engine in the 4,000-lb-thrust class. The resulting LJ95 used very thin structural members to meet weight requirements. From 1962 to 1966 test runs of the LJ95 were carried out in a facility in the tower of one of CAE's buildings in Detroit, and the LJ95 accumulated 200 hours of operation without mishap.

The LJ95 was explored by Northrop as one optional lift engine for the N-289 VTOL demonstrator project conceived in the 1960s.

== Specifications ==
Data from

==== General characteristics ====
- Type: Lift turbojet
- Length:
- Diameter:
- Dry weight: 146.057 kg (322.00 lb)

==== Components ====
- Compressor: six-stage axial compressor
- Turbine: one-stage

==== Performance ====
- Maximum thrust: 22.24 kN (5,000 lbf)
- Thrust-to-weight ratio: >20
