= Teledyne CAE F106 =

F106
- Type: Turbofan
- National origin: United States
- Manufacturer: Teledyne CAE
- Major applications: LTV BGM-110

The Teledyne CAE F106 (company designation Model 472) was a small American turbofan engine developed to power cruise missiles.

== Development and design ==
The F106 engine was developed during the early 1970s to power the missiles being developed for the United States Navy's cruise missile competition. It powered the LTV YBGM-110 which lost the competition to the BGM-109 Tomahawk. While the F106 only powered the YBGM-110 prototype, either it or the Williams F107 could have powered either missile. However, the Navy selected the F107 engine with the BGM-109 missile.

The F106 engine was also a competitor to power the AGM-86 ALCM cruise missile for the United States Air Force, but it likewise lost to the Williams F107 engine.

== Specifications (F106-CA-100) ==
Data from

==== General characteristics ====
- Type: Turbofan
- Length:
- Diameter:
- Dry weight:

==== Components ====
- Compressor:

==== Performance ====
- Maximum thrust: 614 lbf (2.7 kN)

== See also ==
Related lists

- List of aircraft engines
