= Continental T51 =

Turboshaft engine

T51
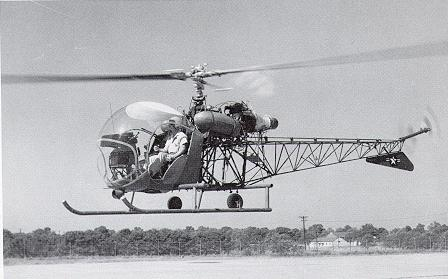
- The T51-powered Bell 201/XH-13F in a hover
- Type: Turboshaft
- National origin: United States
- Manufacturer: Continental Aviation and Engineering
- Major applications: Bell 201; Sikorsky XH-39
- Developed from: Turbomeca Artouste

The Continental CAE T51 was a small turboshaft engine produced by Continental Aviation and Engineering (CAE) under license from Turbomeca. A development of the Artouste, it was followed by three additional turboshaft engines, the T72, the T65, and the T67. However, none of these engines, including the T51, entered full production. CAE abandoned turboshaft development in 1967 after the XT67 lost to the Pratt & Whitney Canada PT6T (T400) to power the Bell UH-1N Twin Huey.

== Variants and derivatives ==
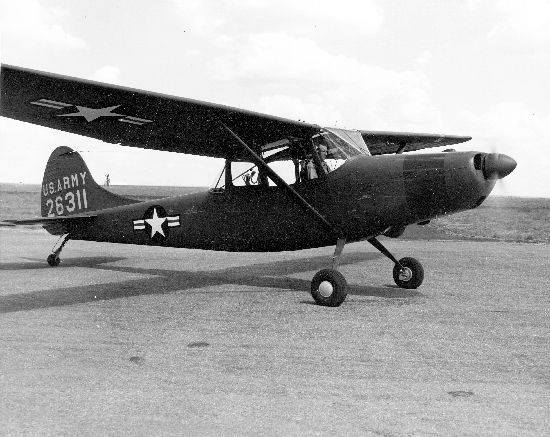
Cessna XL-19C Bird Dog

XT51-1
(Model 210) Based on the Turbomeca Artouste I; 280 shp.
XT51-3
(Model 220-2) Based on the Turbomeca Artouste II; 425 shp.
XT72
(Model 217-5) Based on the Turbomeca Astazou; 600 shp.
XT65
(Model 217-10) A scaled-down version of the Astazou; competed against the Allison T63 to power the Light Observation Helicopter; 305 shp.
T65-T-1
XT67
(Model 217A) two engines driving a common gearbox; based on the Turbomeca Astazou X and T72; 1,540 shp.
Model 210
Company designation for the XT51-1
Model 217-5
Company designation for the XT72
Model 217-10
Company designation for the XT65
Model 217A
Company designation for the XT67
Model 217A-2A
Company designation for the T67-T-1
Model 219
similar to 220–2 with extra axial compressor stage
Model 220-2
Company designation for the XT51-3
Model 227-4A
Company designation for the T65-T-1
Model TS325-1
Alternative company designation for the T65-T-1
Model 327-5
Turboprop version of the T65-T-1

== Applications ==
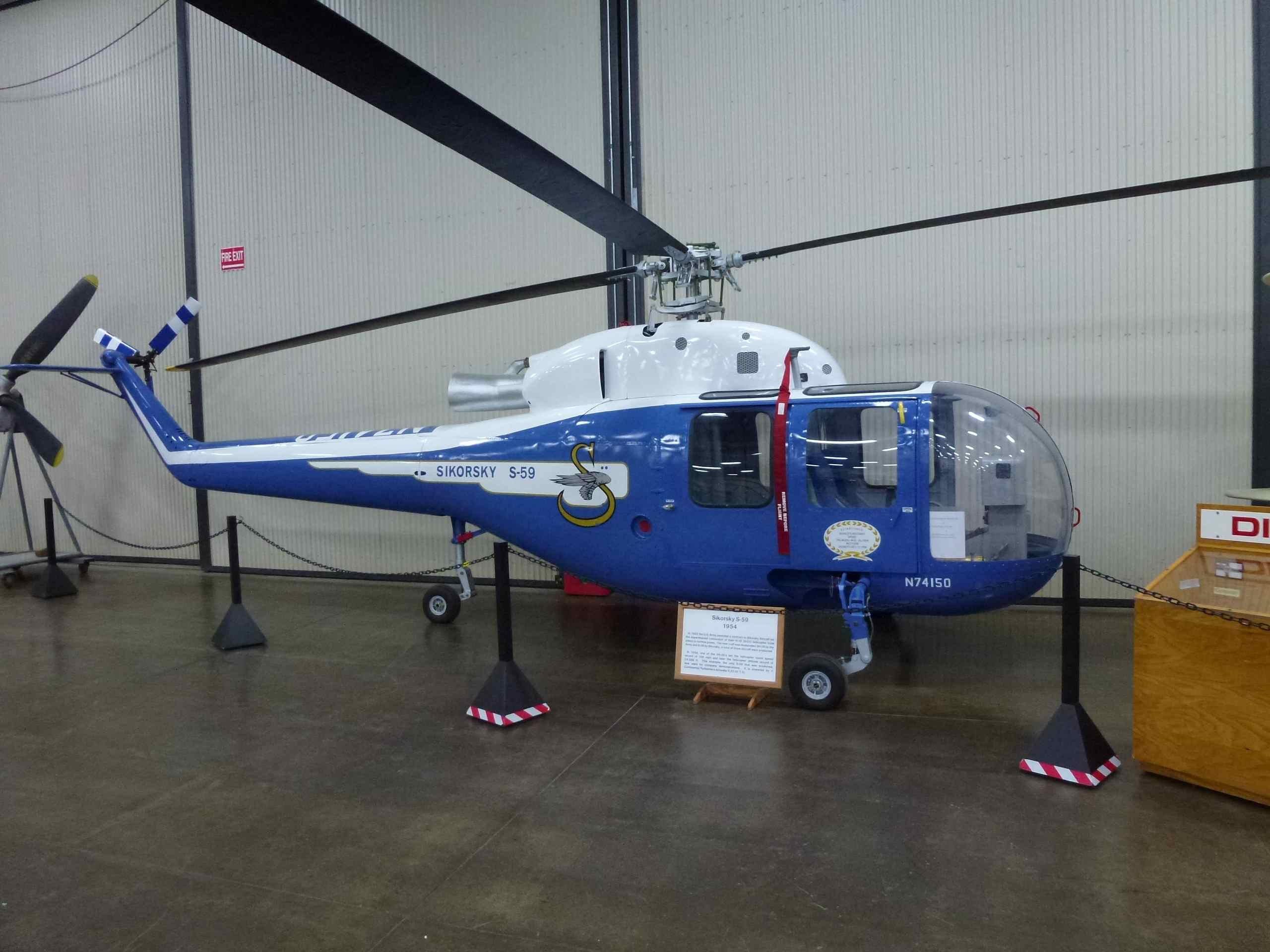
Sikorsky S-59 on display at the New England Air Museum

XT51-1

- XL-19C Bird Dog
- Sikorsky XH-39 (S-59)

XT51-3

- Bell 201 (XH-13F)

XT67

- Bell 208

XT72

- Republic Lark (license-built Aérospatiale Alouette II)

== Specifications (XT51-3) ==
Data from Aircraft engines of the World 1957

==== General characteristics ====
- Type: Turboshaft
- Length: 45.1 in (1,150 mm)
- Width:17.8 in (450 mm)
- Height:21.5 in (550 mm)
- Diameter:
- Dry weight: 236 lb (107 kg)

==== Components ====
- Compressor: 1-stage centrifugal flow
- Combustors: annular compustion chamber
- Turbine: 2-stage axial flow
- Fuel type: JP-4
- Oil system: pressure spray at 20 psi (140 kPa)

==== Performance ====
- Maximum power output:
- Maximum power:425 shp (317 kW) at 34,800 rpm at sea level
- Maximum continuous power:375 shp (280 kW)at 34,800 rpm at sea level
- Overall pressure ratio: 3.9:1
- Air mass flow: 7 lb/s (190 kg/min)
- Turbine inlet temperature: TIT : 1,093.15 K (1,508.00 °F; 820.00 °C); JPT: : 838.15 K (1,049.00 °F; 565.00 °C)
- Fuel consumption: 370 lb/h (170 kg/h)
- Thrust-to-weight ratio: 1.887 lbf/shp (11.26 N/kW)

== See also ==
Related development

- Turbomeca Artouste

Comparable engines

- Boeing T50

Related lists

- List of aircraft engines
