= Morane-Saulnier Epervier =

French ground-attack/reconnaissance aircraft

MS.1500 Epervier
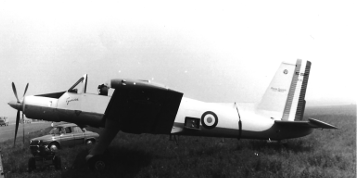

General information
- Type: Ground-attack and reconnaissance monoplane
- National origin: France
- Manufacturer: Morane-Saulnier
- Number built: 2

History
- First flight: 12 May 1958

The Morane-Saulnier MS.1500 Épervier (en: Sparrowhawk) was a 1950s French two-seat ground attack and reconnaissance aircraft. Designed and built by Morane-Saulnier to meet a French Air Force requirement, it did not enter production.

== Development ==
Designed to meet a requirement for a tactical reconnaissance and counter-insurgency aircraft for use by the French Air Force in Algeria the Epervier was a tandem two-seat low-wing cantilever monoplane. Powered by a 522 kW (700 hp)) Turbomeca Bastan turboprop the MS.1500 had a fixed tailwheel landing gear. The prototype first flew on the 12 May 1958 powered by a 300 kW (402 hp)) Turbomeca Marcadau turboprop. A second prototype was built but the type did not enter production.

== Specifications (Epervier with Bastan engine) ==
Data from The Illustrated Encyclopedia of Aircraft, Jane's All the World's Aircraft 1958-59, Aviafreance : Morane-Saulnier MS.1500

General characteristics

- Crew: 2
- Length: 10.58 m (34 ft 9 in)
- Wingspan: 13.06 m (42 ft 10 in)
- Height: 3.30 m (10 ft 10 in)
- Wing area: 24.3 m^{2} (262 sq ft)
- Empty weight: 1,660 kg (3,660 lb)
- Max takeoff weight: 2,850 kg (6,283 lb)
- Powerplant: 1 × Turbomeca Bastan IV turboprop, 560 kW (750 shp)
- Propellers: 3-bladed constant-speed propeller

Performance

- Maximum speed: 315 km/h (196 mph, 170 kn)
- Range: 700 km (430 mi, 380 nmi)
- Ferry range: 1,300 km (810 mi, 700 nmi)
- Rate of climb: 8 m/s (1,600 ft/min) minimum

Armament

- Rockets: 6 × rocket pods
- Bombs: 6 × 50 kg (110 lb) anti-personnel bombs

== Bibliography ==
- Cuny, Jean (1989). Les avions de combat français, 2: Chasse lourde, bombardement, assaut, exploration [French Combat Aircraft 2: Heavy Fighters, Bombers, Attack, Reconnaissance]. Docavia (in French). Vol. 30. Ed. Larivière. OCLC 36836833.
- Rossignol, Jean-Pierre (February 1978). "Ce fut le dernier avion de la fameuse lignée M.S.... Morane Saulnier 1500 "Epervier"" [The Last Aircraft from a Famous Line: The Morane Saulnier 1500 Epervier]. Le Fana de l'Aviation (in French) (99): 24–29. ISSN 0757-4169.
