= Merckle SM 67 =

SM 67
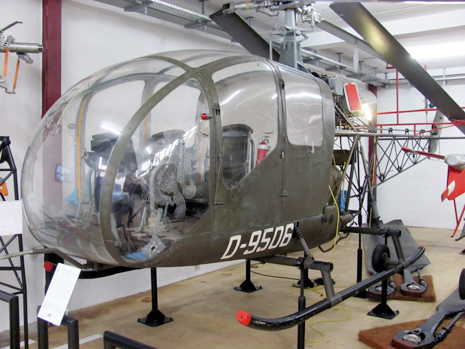
- Second SM 67 prototype on display

General information
- Type: Light utility helicopter
- National origin: West Germany
- Manufacturer: Süddeutsche Flugzeugwerke K. E. Merckle
- Status: prototype only
- Primary user: Bundeswehr (intended)
- Number built: 3

History
- First flight: 7 July 1959

The Merckle SM 67 was an experimental helicopter built in West Germany in the late 1950s.

== Design ==
The SM 67 was the first turbine-powered helicopter in Germany. The German Federal Ministry of Defense commissioned the development in 1957. The design of the SM 67 was similar to that of the Alouette II, including a metal frame of the rear fuselage. The first prototype flew on July 7, 1959, and flight tests revealed remarkably low vibration level as well as good controllability and stability. Therefore, two more prototypes were built, in which the experience gained with the first prototype was taken into account. However, the first prototype was destroyed during tests, and the Bundeswehr opted for the SE-3130 Alouette II rather than the SM 67 due to the earlier availability of the former.

== Surviving examples ==
The second prototype was used at MBB as a test stand for components of the Bo 105. Together with the other, still preserved third prototype, it was later put together to form the machine that can be viewed today in the helicopter museum in Bückeburg.

== Specifications ==
Data from

General characteristics

- Crew: 1
- Capacity: 4 passengers
- Length: 10.02 m (32 ft 10 in)
- Height: 2.80 m (9 ft 2 in)
- Empty weight: 1,037 kg (2,286 lb)
- Gross weight: 1,700 kg (3,748 lb)
- Powerplant: 1 × Turboméca Artouste IIC turboshaft engine, 303 kW (406 shp)
- Main rotor diameter: 10.50 m (34 ft 5 in)
- Main rotor area: 86.6 m^{2} (932 sq ft) 3-bladed main rotor

Performance

- Maximum speed: 220 km/h (140 mph, 120 kn)
- Cruise speed: 190 km/h (120 mph, 100 kn)
- Range: 300 km (190 mi, 160 nmi)
- Service ceiling: 3,500 m (11,500 ft)
