= Turbomeca Artouste =

Early French turboshaft engine

Artouste
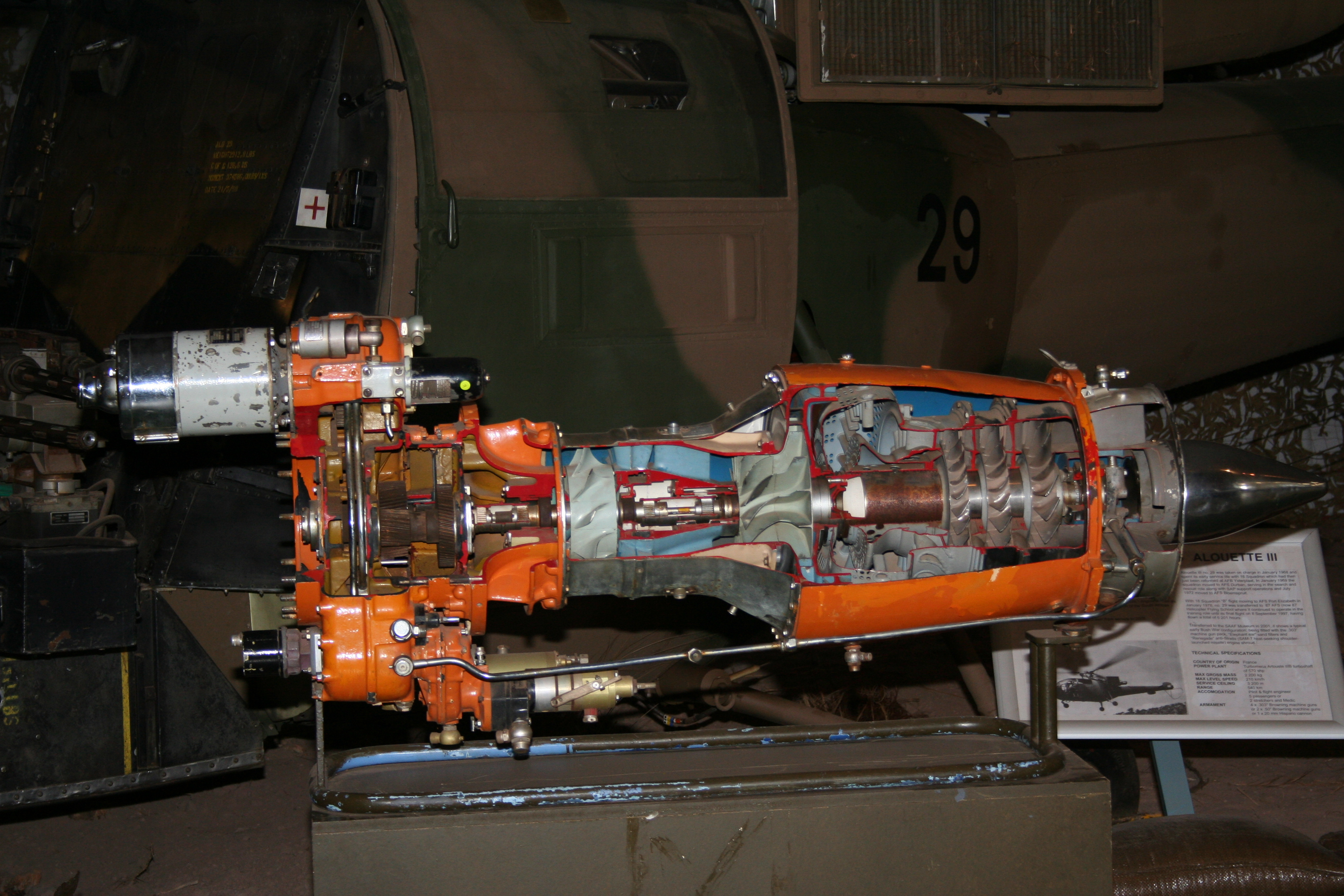
- Turbomeca Artouste IIIB
- Type: Turboshaft
- National origin: France
- Manufacturer: Turbomeca
- First run: 1947
- Major applications: Aérospatiale Alouette II; Aérospatiale Alouette III
- Developed into: Continental T51

The Turbomeca Artouste is an early French single-spool turboshaft engine, first run in 1947. Originally conceived as an auxiliary power unit (APU), it was soon adapted to aircraft propulsion, and found a niche as a powerplant for turboshaft-driven helicopters in the 1950s. Artoustes were licence-built by Bristol Siddeley (formerly Blackburn) in the UK, Hindustan Aeronautics Limited in India, and developed by Continental CAE in the US as the Continental T51. Two major versions of the Artouste were produced. The Artouste II family, mainly used in the Aérospatiale Alouette II helicopter, had a one-stage centrifugal compressor and a two-stage turbine, with gearbox-limited power of 300 kW (400 hp). The Artouste III family, mainly used in Aérospatiale's Alouette III and Lama helicopters, had a two-stage axial-centrifugal compressor and a three-stage turbine, with gearbox-limited power of 420–440 kW (560–590 hp).

== Variants ==
Artouste I
Artouste II
Artouste IIB, IIB1
300 kW (400 hp) for takeoff, 245 kW (330 hp) continuous
Artouste IIC, IIC1, IIC2, IIC5, IIC6
300 kW (400 hp) for takeoff, 245 kW (330 hp) continuous (limited by engine gearbox)
(Without gearbox limit, ratings are 390 kW (523 hp) for takeoff and 353 kW (473 hp) continuous)
Artouste IIIB
420 kW (563 hp) for takeoff, 405 kW (543 hp) continuous (limited by engine gearbox)
(Without gearbox limit, sea level ratings are 640 kW (858 hp) for takeoff and 515 kW (690 hp) continuous)
Artouste IIIB1, IIID
440 kW (590 hp) for takeoff, 405 kW (543 hp) continuous (limited by engine gearbox)
(Without gearbox limit, sea level ratings are 640 kW (858 hp) for takeoff and 515 kW (690 hp) continuous)
Continental T51
Licence production and development of the Artouste in the United States
Turbomeca Marcadau
A turboprop variant, the Marcadau was a development of the Artouste II, producing 300 kW (402 hp) through a 2.3:1 reduction gearbox.

== Applications ==
Artouste

- Aérospatiale Alouette II
- Aérospatiale Alouette III
- Aerospatiale Lama
- Aerotécnica AC-14
- Atlas XH-1 Alpha
- Curtiss-Wright VZ-7
- Handley Page Victor - as APU
- Hawker Siddeley Trident - as APU
- IAR 316
- IAR 317
- Merckle SM 67
- Nord Norelfe
- Piasecki VZ-8 Airgeep
- SNCASO Farfadet
- Vickers VC10 - as APU

Marcadau

- Morane-Saulnier Epervier

== Engines on display ==
A Turbomeca Artouste is on public display at:

- The Helicopter Museum (Weston)
- Aviodrome - Lelystad Airport - The Netherlands

== Specifications (Artouste IIIB) ==
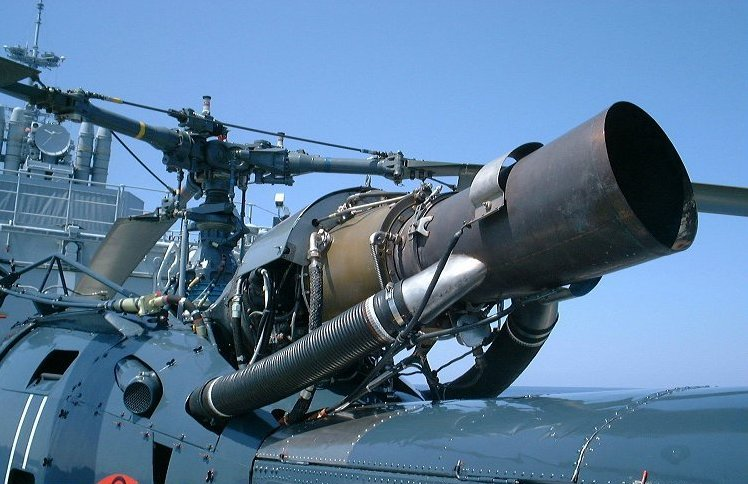
Turbomeca Artouste on an Alouette III

Data from Aircraft engines of the World 1970

==== General characteristics ====
- Type: Turboshaft
- Length: 1,815 mm (71.5 in)
- Diameter: ~450 mm (18 in) (casing)
- Width: 507 mm (20.0 in)
- Height: 627 mm (24.7 in)
- Dry weight: 154 kg (340 lb)

==== Components ====
- Compressor: 1-stage axial + 1-stage centrifugal
- Combustors: Annular combustion chamber
- Turbine: 3-stage turbine
- Fuel type: Aviation Kerosene, such as Jet A, Jet A-1 or JP-4
- Oil system: Pressure spray at 4.6 bar (66 psi) with return

==== Performance ====
- Maximum power output:

- Take-off power: 437 kW (586 shp) (equivalent) (410 kW (550 shp) + 0.39 kN (88 lbf)) at 33,500 rpm, de-rated
- Maximum continuous power: 437 kW (586 shp) (equivalent) (410 kW (550 shp) + 0.39 kN (88 lbf)) at 33,500 rpm, to 5,000 m (16,000 ft)

- Overall pressure ratio: 5.2:1
- Air mass flow: 4.3 kg/s (9.5 lb/s)
- Turbine inlet temperature: JPT 773 K (500 °C) at 33,500 rpm
- Specific fuel consumption: 0.46 kg/kWh (0.76 lb/(hp⋅h)) (equivalent)
- Power-to-weight ratio: 2.84 kW/kg (1.73 hp/lb) (equivalent)

== See also ==
Related development

- Continental T51

Related lists

- List of aircraft engines
