= Aérospatiale Alouette II =

Utility helicopter family by Sud Aviation

SE 313/SA 318 Alouette II
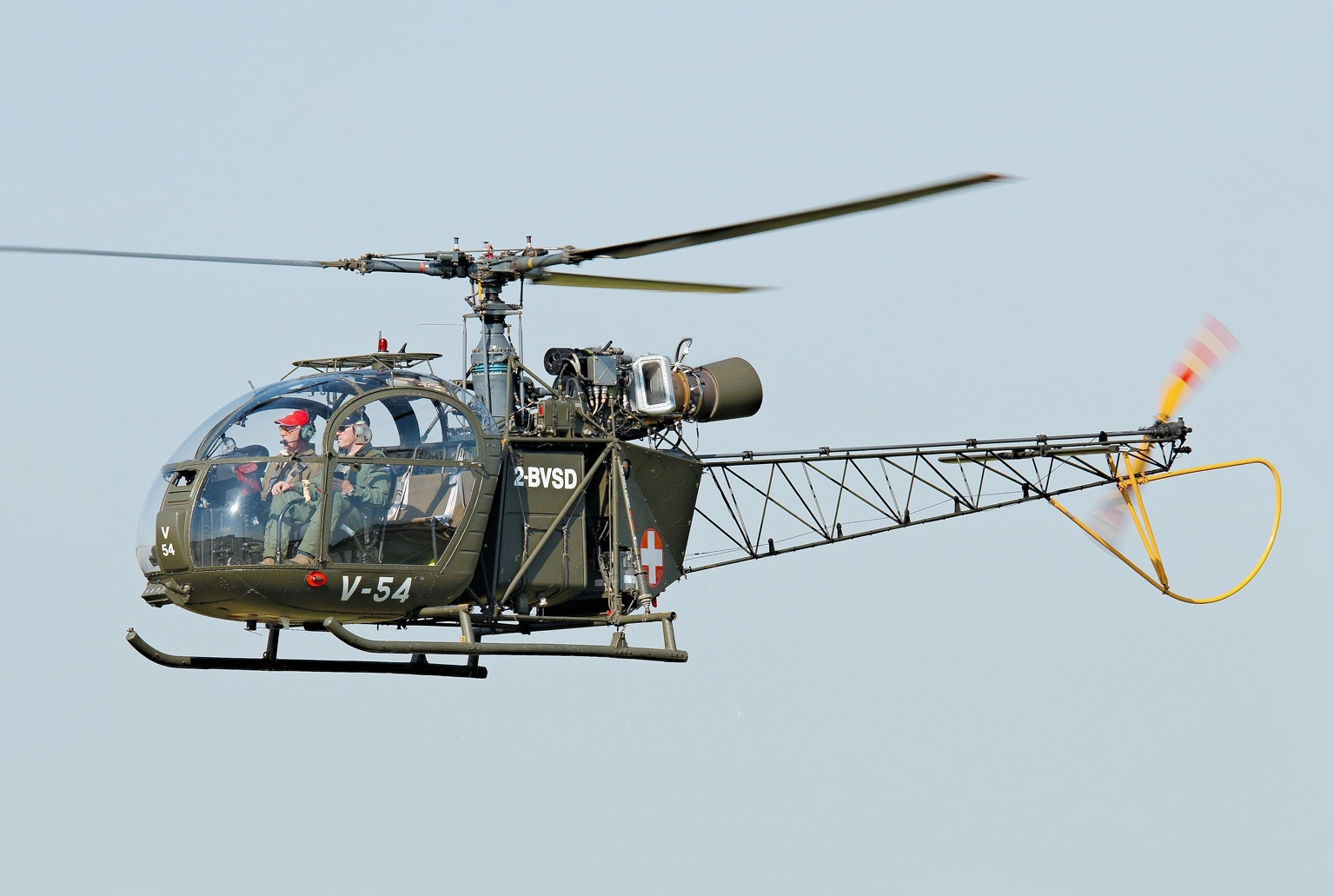
- An SE.3130 Alouette II (ex-Swiss Air Force)

General information
- Type: Light helicopter
- National origin: France
- Manufacturer: Sud Aviation; Aérospatiale
- Status: Limited service
- Primary users: French Army French Air Force; German Army; Swiss Air Force (retired)
- Number built: 1,300+

History
- Manufactured: 1956–1975
- Introduction date: 2 May 1957
- First flight: 12 March 1955
- Variant: Aérospatiale SA 315B Lama
- Developed into: Aérospatiale Alouette III

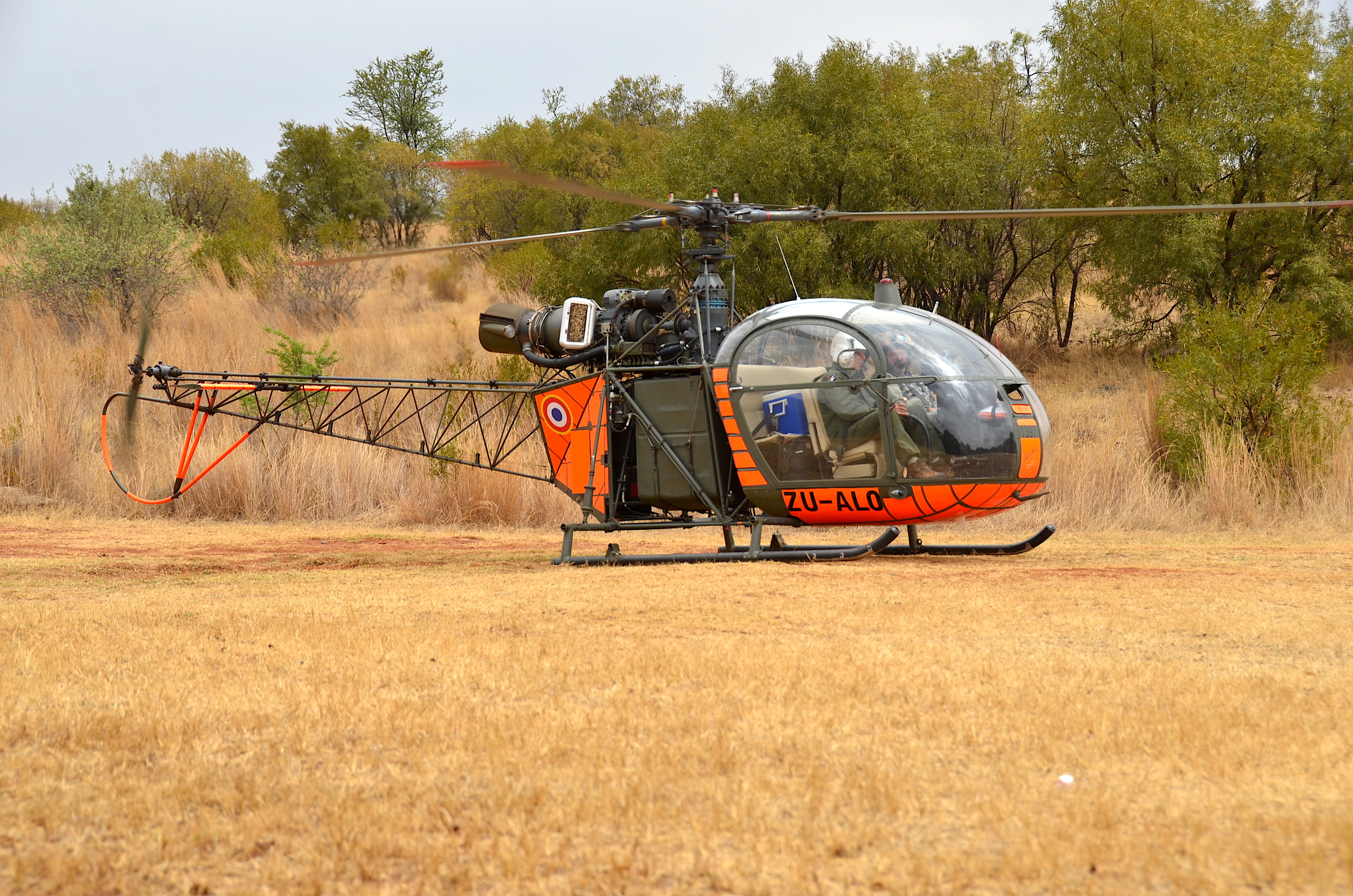
Sud Aviation SE.3130 Alouette II ZU-ALO; Private operator in South Africa

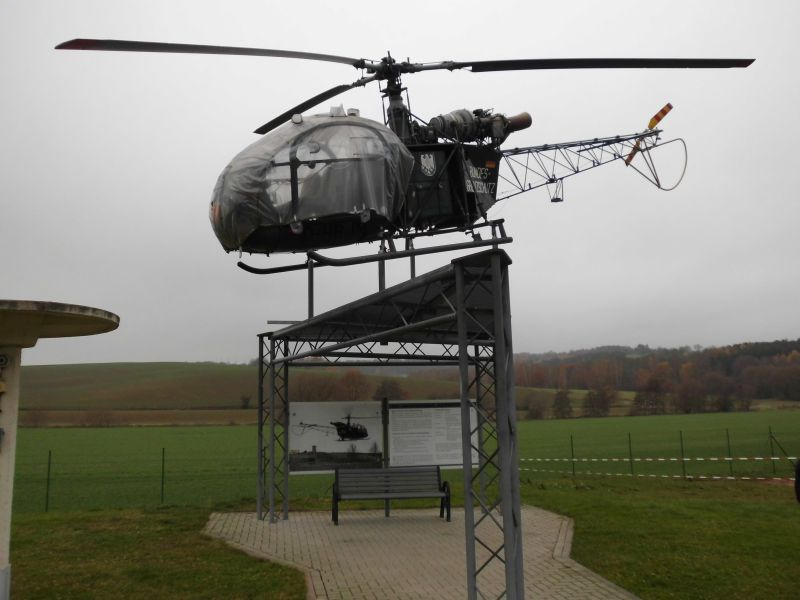
SA 318C Alouette II Astazou at the Borderland Museum Eichsfeld in Central Germany.

The Aérospatiale Alouette II (French pronunciation: [alwɛt], "lark"; company designations SE 313 and SA 318) is a French light helicopter originally manufactured by Sud Aviation and later Aérospatiale. It was the first conventional production helicopter powered by a gas turbine engine instead of the heavier conventional piston powerplant.

On 12 March 1955, the prototype SE 3130 performed its maiden flight. The Alouette II was a widely used type and popular with operators, with over 1,300 rotorcraft eventually being constructed between 1956 and 1975. The type was predominantly used for military purposes in observation, photography, air-sea rescue, liaison and training. It has also carried anti-tank missiles and homing torpedoes. In civilian roles, the Alouette II has been used for medical evacuation (with two external stretcher panniers), crop-spraying, and as a flying crane—with a 500-kilogram (1,100 lb) external underslung load.

A high-altitude derivative, the SA 315B Lama, was developed and entered operational service in July 1971. The Alouette II also was further developed into the larger and more powerful Alouette III. In 1975, production of the type was terminated, having been effectively succeeded by these newer rotorcraft. Despite it being long out of production, considerable numbers of Alouette II were still in service at the start of the 21st century.

== Development ==
Although Sud-Est's previous helicopter design, the SE 3120 Alouette, broke helicopter speed and distance records in July 1953, it was too complex an aircraft to market successfully. With the records falling, the French government started showing interest, but with their financial backing, the state gave an ultimatum that within two years a helicopter had to be in production, otherwise all rotary wing activities would cease. SNCASE came up with seven helicopter designs powered by turboshaft engines: X.310A – X.310G. Earlier Joseph Szydlowski, the founder of Turbomeca, had successfully managed to develop the Artouste, a 260 hp (190 kW) single shaft turbine engine derived from his Orédon turbine. The X.310G design was chosen and, together with an improved version of the Artouste engine, was fast-tracked towards production as the SE 3130 Alouette II.

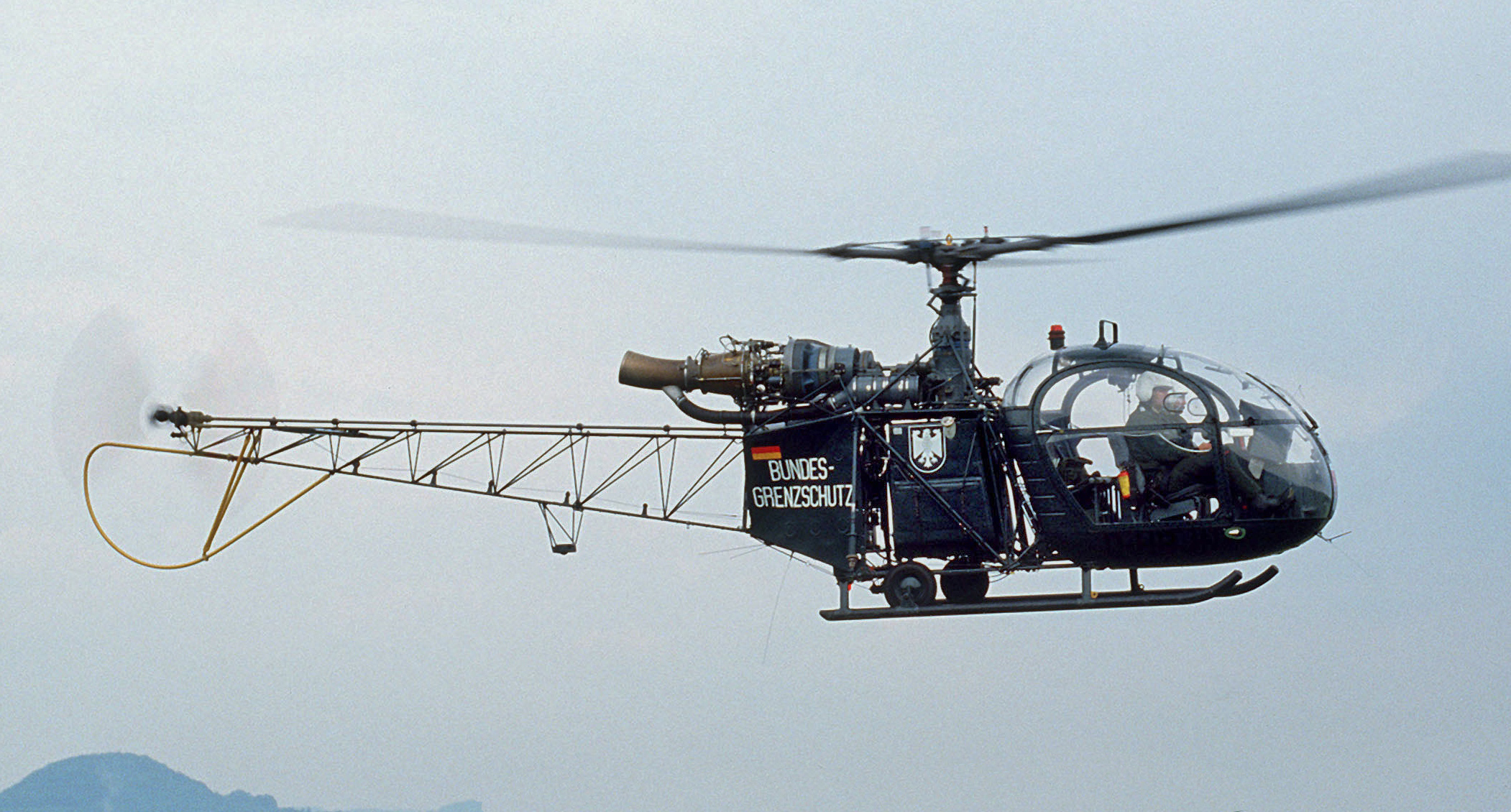
A West German Alouette II Astazou patrolling the border with East Germany, 1985

On 12 March 1955, the prototype SE 3130 performed its maiden flight; within three months, on 6 June, a pre-production Alouette II, flown by Jean Boulet, established a new helicopter altitude record of 8,209 m (26,932 ft). According to the manufacturer, such early demonstrations of the Alouette II had served to promote the performance and advantages of turbine helicopters over their piston-engined counterparts.

In April 1956, the first production Alouette II was completed, making it the first production turbine-powered helicopter in the world. Upon completion, several of the initial production models were dispatched for a series of evaluation flights in the Alps. On 13 June 1958, a single SE 3130, again flown by Boulet, re-took the altitude record, reaching a height of 10,984 m (36,027 ft). In 1964, a new version of the Alouette II was introduced, the SA 3180 Alouette II Astazou (originally called "Alouette Astazou"), using the Turbomeca Astazou IIA engine in place of the Artouste II. In 1975, production of the Alouette II ended after more than 1,300 had been built; in 1969, a new high-altitude variant, the Aérospatiale SA 315B Lama had been developed to replace it in this niche capacity. A slightly larger and more powerful helicopter in the form of the Aérospatiale Alouette III has also entered production, which had negatively impacted upon the demand for the older II model.

== Design ==
The Aérospatiale Alouette II is a French light helicopter, incorporating many innovations of its time. It was powered by a single Turbomeca Artouste II turboshaft engine capable of generating a maximum output of 400 hp. The speed of the main rotor is controlled by an automated fuel supply governor, eliminating the necessity of a twist-grip throttle and a conventional link between the throttle and the collective-pitch. Instead, the Alouette II uses a simple control lever arrangement, which acts to directly regulate the collective-pitch and actuate the governor while immediately and automatically applying the correct level of power to conform with flight condition. Without a clutch, the transmission is considerably simplified in both design and maintenance aspects.

Despite being a light helicopter, the Alouette II possesses a reasonable lift capacity and can carry underslung loads on an external sling; during one high-profile public demonstration, one helicopter was able to air-lift a compact Citroen truck weighing in excess of half a ton without visible difficulty. While flying at sea level, the Alouette II uses only 300 of the powerplant's available 400 hp; accordingly, performance can be maintained while operated at a high altitude and within tropical conditions where the additional power would come into play. It was capable of flying at altitudes of up to 2,286 meters above sea level while possessing an average climb rate of 250 meters per minute and a typical maximum range of 563 miles. Various alternative landing gear configurations could be fitted, including skids, wheels, or pontoons.

The Alouette II is capable of accommodating a seating arrangement for up to five personnel, including the pilot; access to the cabin was provided via a pair of side-hinged doors. The compact cockpit was provided with a dome-shaped windscreen which provided for excellent levels of external visibility. The Alouette II also made innovative use of armaments. It was the first helicopter worldwide to be equipped with anti-tank munitions in the form of the Nord AS.11 MCLOS wire-guided anti-tank missile. In addition to anti-tank missiles, the French Army chose to arm their Alouette IIs with machine guns, while the French Navy outfitted theirs with aerial torpedoes to conduct anti-submarine warfare (ASW) duties.

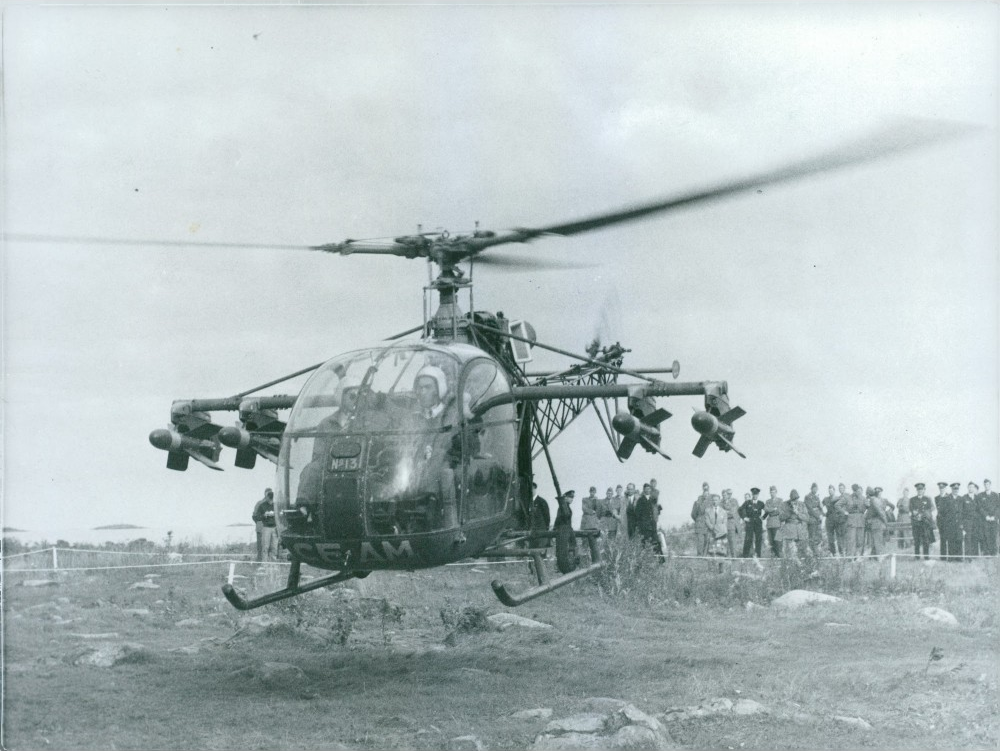
SS.11 armed Alouette II being demonstrated in Sweden, september 1958

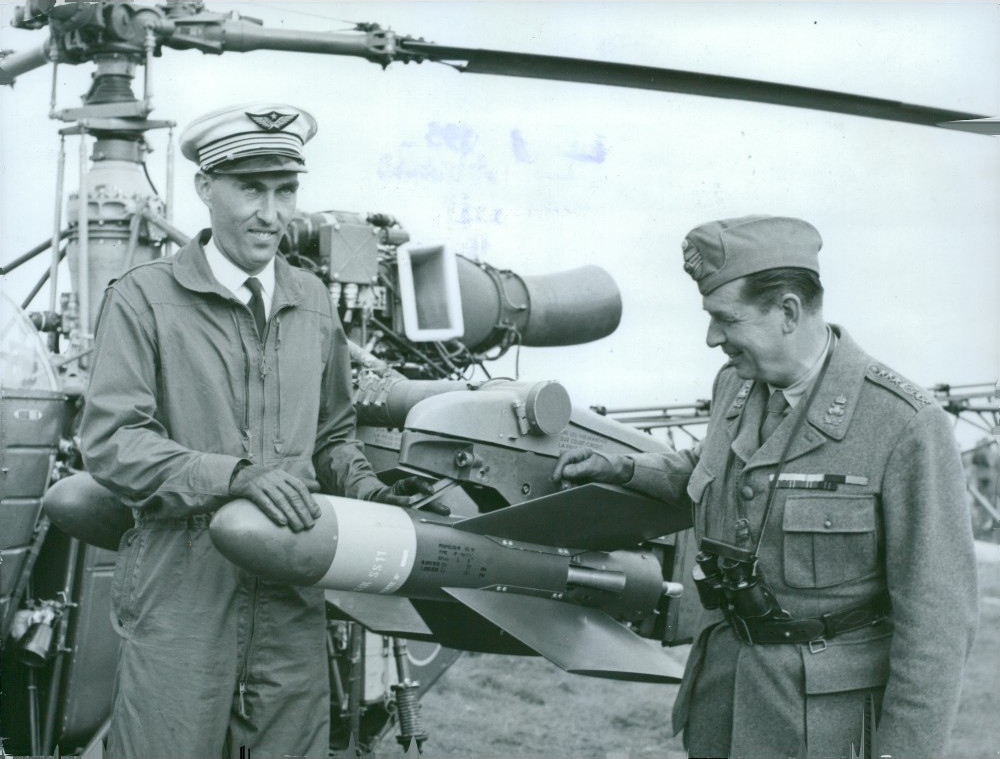
SS.11 armed Alouette II being demonstrated in Sweden, september 1958

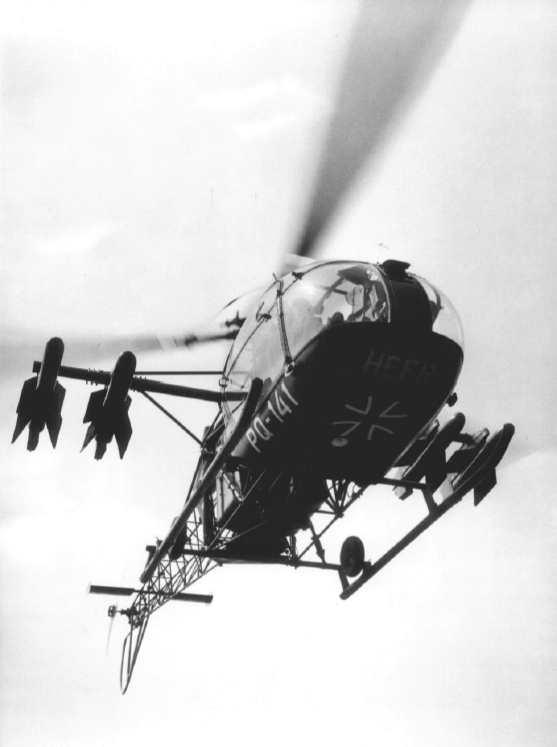
SS.11 armed Alouette II in German service

Under operational conditions, the Alouette II often proved to be a relatively maintenance-intensive rotorcraft. It required a high level of regular lubrication, the main rotorhead alone featuring 20 grease nipples that had to be re-lubricated after every five flight hours, while the drive shaft for the tail rotor was similarly demanding. Due to its high susceptibility to dust ingestion, some operators would have to remove the Alouette's rectangular sand filters after every landing in order to clean them.

== Operational history ==
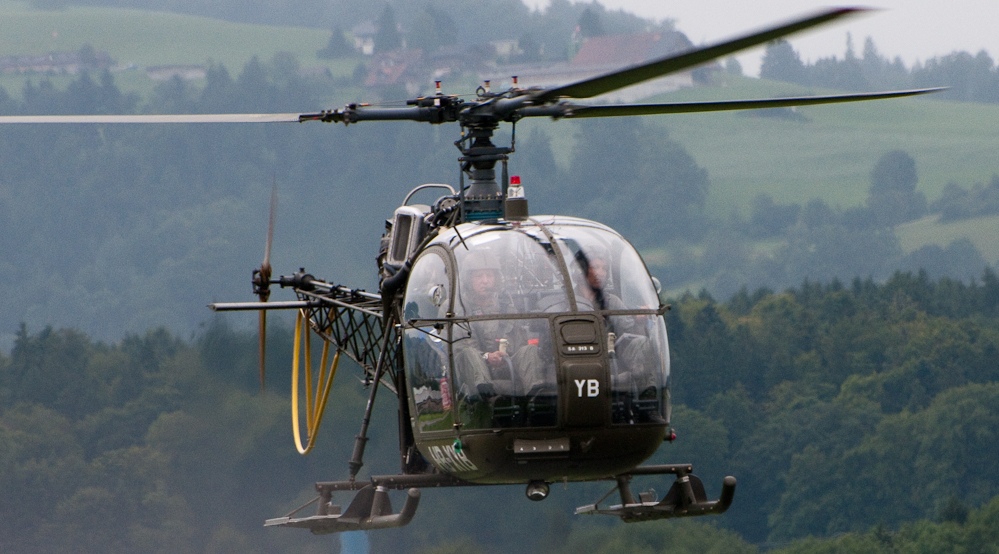
An Alouette II in flight, 2010

On 3 July 1956, prior to even entering civil service, the Alouette II was responsible for breaking new ground when it became the first helicopter to perform a mountain rescue mission, having been deployed to evacuate a mountaineer who had suffered from cardiac arrest at over 4,000 m (13,000 ft). On 3 January 1957, the Alouette II was called upon again in order to rescue the crew of a crashed Sikorsky S-58, which had been searching for missing mountaineers Jean Vincendon and François Henry on Mont Blanc.

On 2 May 1957, following a series of airborne trials, the Alouette II was awarded a French domestic certificate of airworthiness, which cleared the type to enter service with civil operators. Initial production was allocated to fulfil those orders placed by the French military, as well as by civilian customers. During 1957, the first deliveries of the Alouette II were made to the French Army. Shortly thereafter, large-scale orders for the type were received from several foreign nations, including the United Kingdom, Federal Republic of Germany, and Austria.

Almost immediately upon entering service, French forces commenced active combat operations using their fledgling Alouette II fleet; the type being placed into heavy use in the Algerian War, during which it made valuable contributions to France's activities in the theatre. When used as a troop-transport, up to four fully equipped soldiers could be airlifted at a time. Additionally, a number of Alouette IIs were modified to become what has been argued by some to have been the world's first helicopter gunships; in this capacity, it would have been typically armed with Nord Aviation-built SS.10 or SS.11 anti-tank missiles.

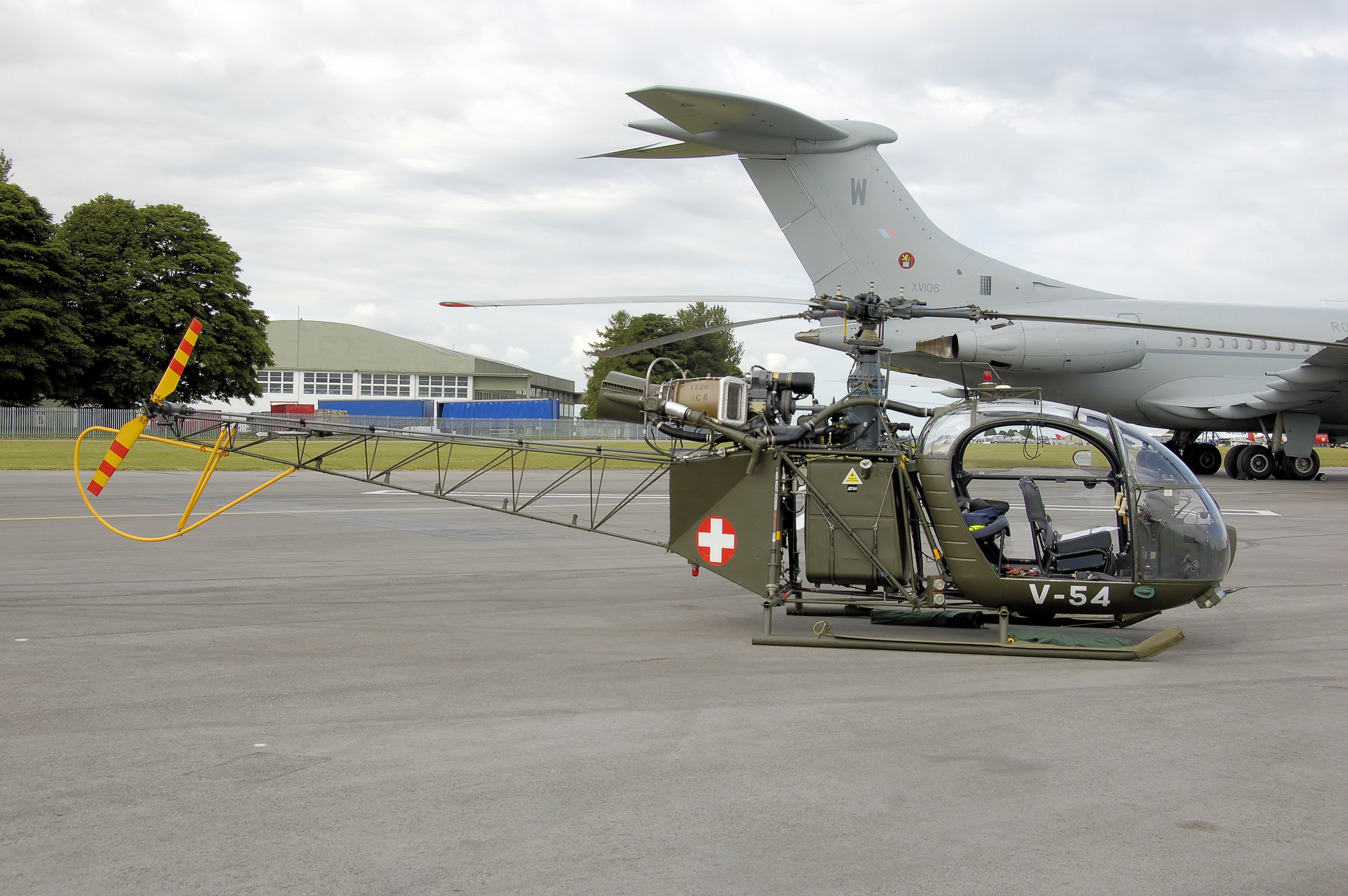
An SE.3130 Alouette II, formerly V-54 of the Swiss Air Force, now on the UK civil register as G-BVSD. It was built in 1964.

The nation of Rhodesia emerged as a prolific user of both the Alouette II and its enlarged sibling, the Alouette III. Early operations were flown with an emphasis on its use by the Army and British South Africa Police, including paramilitary and aerial reconnaissance operations. Throughout the 1960s, the type progressively spread into additional roles, including aerial supply, casualty evacuation, communications relays, and troop-transports. Rhodesian aerial operations would typically involve flying under relatively high and hot conditions, which reduced the efficiency of aircraft in general; however, the Alouette II proved to be both hardy and relatively resistant to battle damage. In order to extend the inadequate range of the type, fuel caches were strategically deployed across the country to be used for refuelling purposes.

In order to improve performance, Rhodesia's Alouette II fleet was subject to extensive modifications, including changes to their refuelling apparatus, gun sights, cabin fittings, armouring, and armaments. Over time, the Rhodesian Security Forces developed an innovative deployment tactic of rapidly encircling and enveloping enemies, known as the Fireforce, for which the Alouette II served as a core component. The quick-reaction Fireforce battalions were centred at Centenary and Mount Darwin; emphasis was placed on locating both rotorcraft and troops as close to a current or anticipated theatre of operations as would be feasibly possible.

By 1975, at which point production of the type was terminated, in excess of 1,300 Alouette IIs had been constructed. The rotorcraft was also in use in over 80 countries, including 47 separate armed forces. The Alouette II was produced and sold under licence by Brazil, Sweden, India and in the United States. While succeeded in some respects by the SA 315B Lama, which was itself a derivative of the Alouette II; the French Army ultimately replaced their Alouette II fleet with a newly developed observation and reconnaissance helicopter in the form of the Aérospatiale AS350 Écureuil.

During July 2018, a single Alouette II was involved in the helicopter prison escape of the French gangster Rédoine Faïd. The rotorcraft, which had been hijacked by gang members who held the pilot hostage at gunpoint, flew into the courtyard of Réau prison, before flying to Roissy in the north-eastern suburbs of Paris; the event allegedly occurred in under ten minutes from take-off to escape.

== Variants ==
- SE 3130 Alouette II – Initial version powered by Turbomeca Artouste II series engine rated at 300 kW (400 hp) for takeoff, with maximum weight of 1,500 kg (3,300 lb).
- SE 313B Alouette II – Version of SE 3130 powered by Turbomeca Artouste IIC5 or IIC6 engine rated at 300 kW (400 hp) for takeoff, with maximum weight raised to 1,600 kg (3,500 lb).
- SE 3131 Gouverneur – Refined executive version with enclosed tailboom, which was abandoned in favour of the Alouette III.
- SE 3140 Alouette II – Proposed version, it was going to be powered by a 298 kW (400 hp) Turbomeca Turmo II engine. None were built.
- HKP 2 Alouette II – Swedish licence version of the SE 3130
- SA 3180 Alouette II Astazou – Version powered by Turbomeca Astazou IIA or IIA2 engine rated at 390 kW (523 hp) for takeoff and 353 kW (473 hp) continuous, but restricted to 300 kW (400 hp) by rotor transmission limitations, with maximum weight of 1,500 kg (3,300 lb).
- SA 318B Alouette II Astazou – Version of SA 3180 with maximum weight raised to 1,600 kg (3,500 lb).
- SA 318C Alouette II Astazou – Version of SA 3180 with maximum weight raised to 1,650 kg (3,650 lb)
- SA 315B Lama – designed to meet an Indian armed forces requirement for operation in "hot and high" conditions; it combined the Artouste powerplant and rotor system of the Alouette III with a reinforced Alouette II airframe.
- Republic Lark: Proposed production in the United States by Republic Aircraft, powered by a 600 shp (447 kW) AiResearch TSE-331-7 turboshaft.

== Operators ==
Tunisia

- Tunisian Air Force

Turkey

- General Directorate of Security

=== Former operators ===
Austria

- Austrian Air Force

Biafra

- Biafran armed forces

Belgium

- Belgian Army
- Gendarmerie

Benin

- Military of Benin

Brazil

- Brazilian Air Force

Cambodia

- Royal Cambodian Air Force

Cameroon

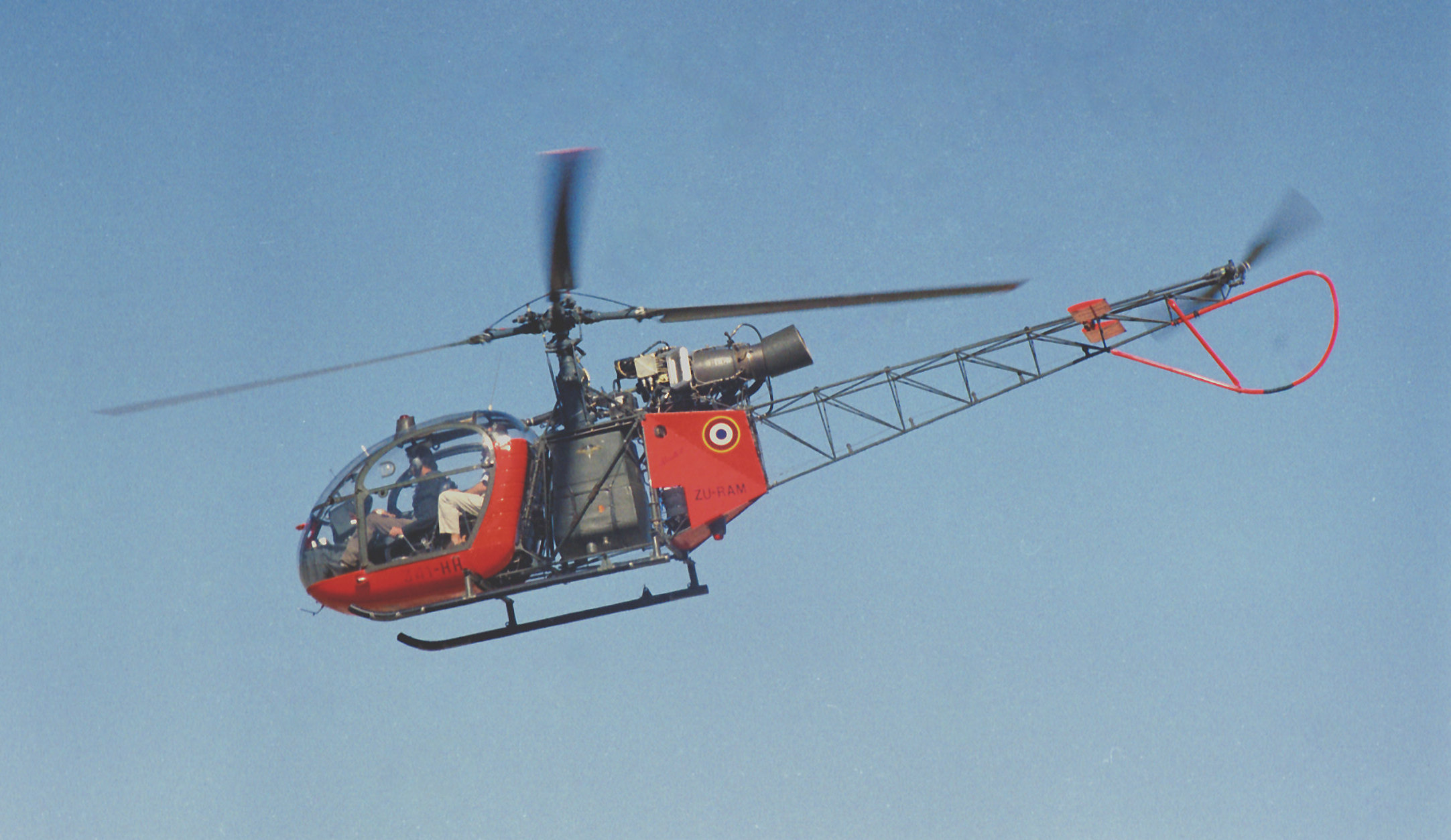
SE 3130 Alouette II in its former French markings

- Cameroon Air Force

Central African Republic

- Central African Republic Air Force

Republic of the Congo

- Congolese Air Force

Djibouti

- Djibouti Air Force

Dominican Republic

- Dominican Air Force

France

- French Air Force
- French Army
- French Navy
- Gendarmerie Nationale
- Securite Civile

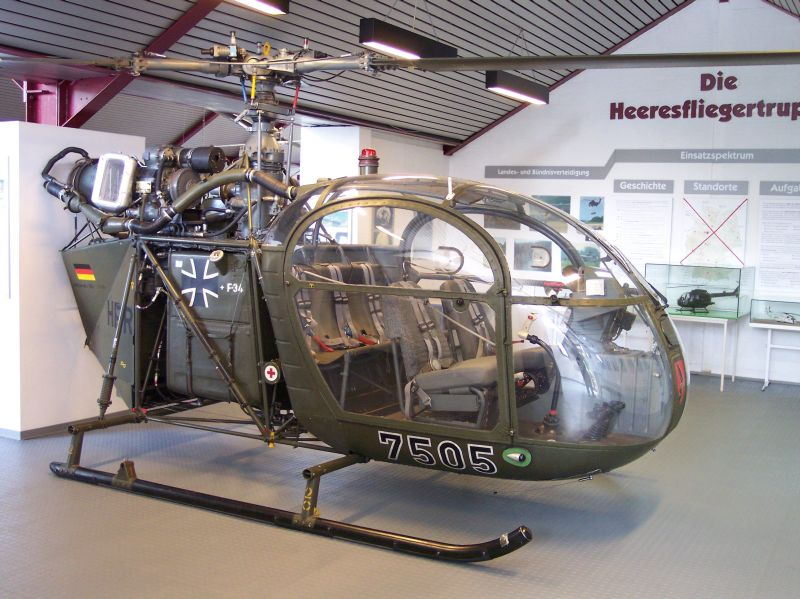
An Aérospatiale SE 3130 Alouette II of the German Army

Germany

- German Army
- German Federal Police
- German Air Force

Guinea-Bissau

- Guinea-Bissau Air Force

Indonesia

- Indonesian Army
- Indonesian Navy

Israel

- Israeli Air Force

Ivory Coast

- Ivory Coast Air Force

Katanga

- Katangese Air Force

Khmer Republic

- Khmer Air Force

Laos

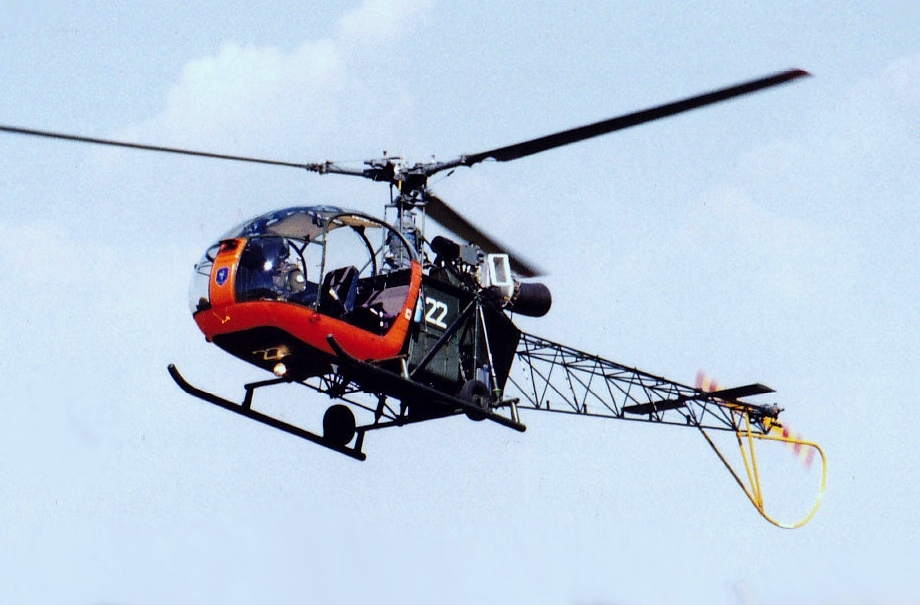
A SAAF Alouette II

- Royal Lao Air Force

Lebanon

- Lebanese Air Force

Madagascar

- Malagasy Air Force

Mexico

- Mexican Navy

Netherlands

- Netherlands Air Force

Peru

- Peruvian Army

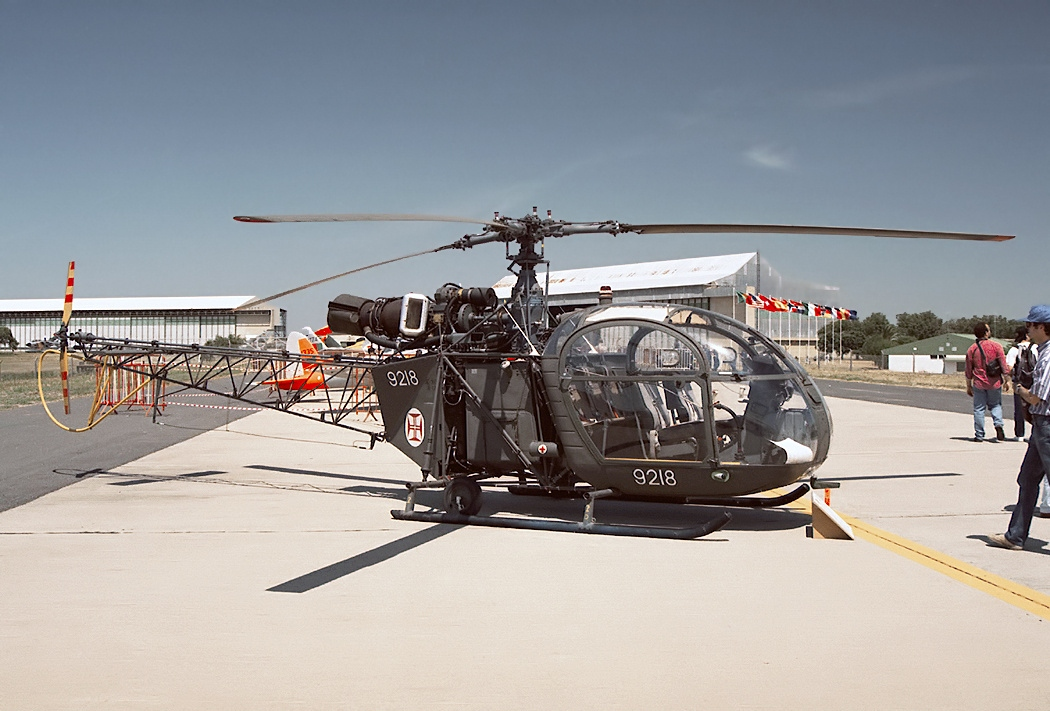
Portuguese Air Force Alouette II in 1996

Portugal

- Portuguese Air Force
- National Republican Guard

Rhodesia

- Rhodesian Air Force

Romania

- Romanian Air Force

Senegal

- Senegalese Air Force

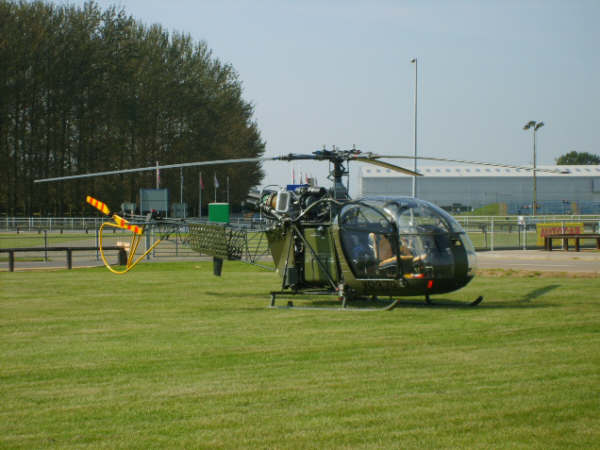
British Army Air Corps Alouette II

South Africa

- South African Air Force

Spain

- Spanish National Police

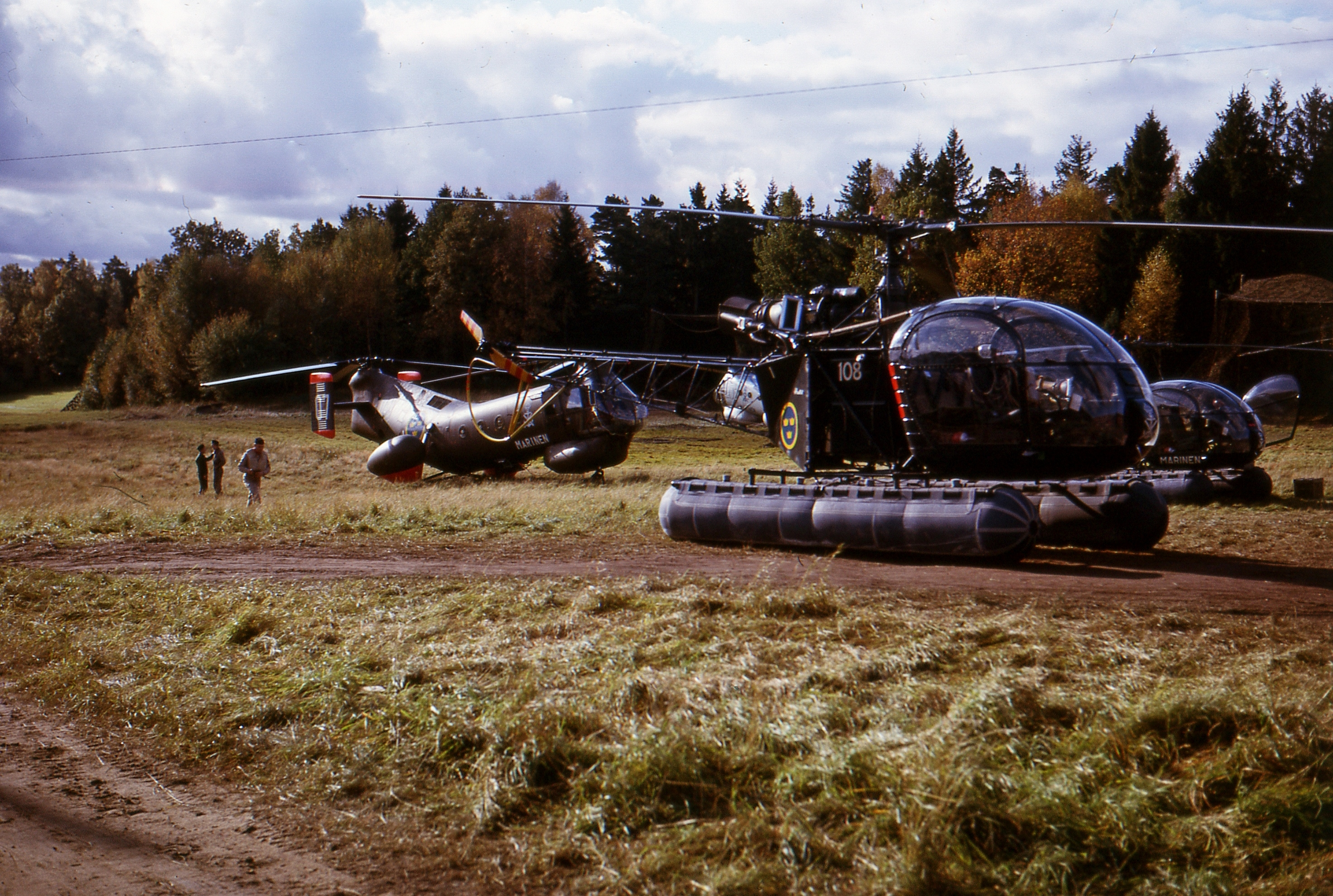
Swedish Alouette IIs in 1963

Sweden

- Swedish Air Force
- Swedish Army

Switzerland

- Swiss Air Force

Turkey

- Gendarmerie General Command
- Turkish Air Force

United Kingdom

- Army Air Corps

West Germany

- Federal Border Guard

Zimbabwe

- Air Force of Zimbabwe

== Specifications (SE 313B Alouette II) ==
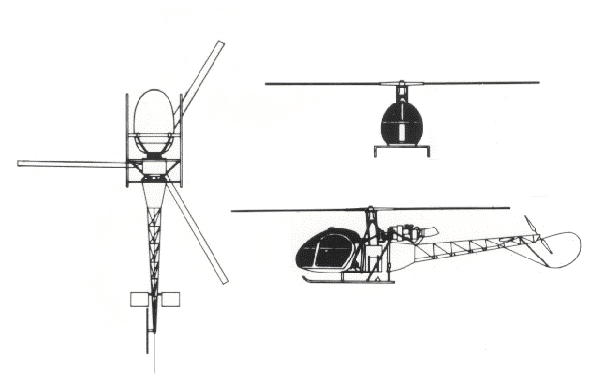
Orthographically projected diagram of the Aérospatiale Alouette II

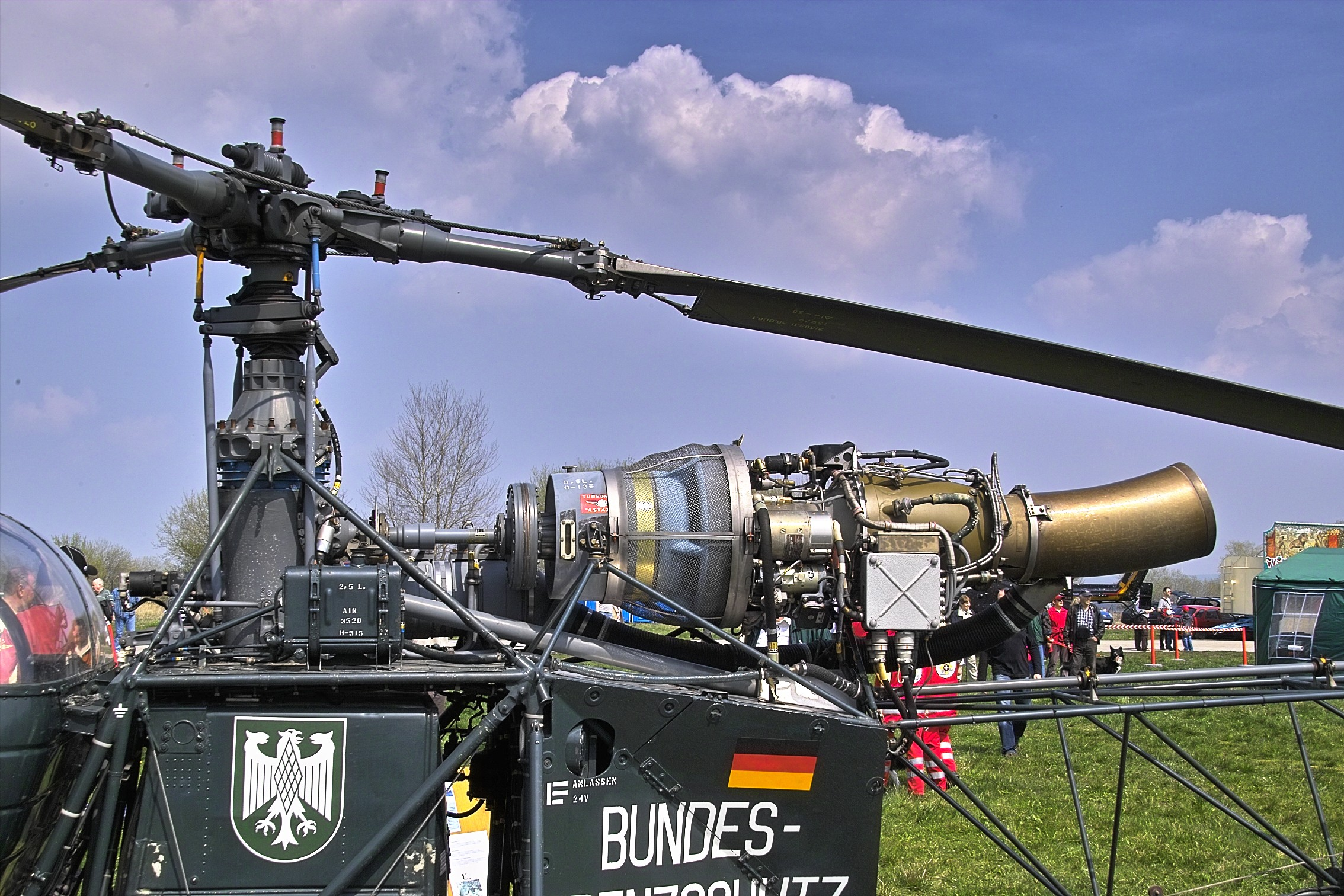
Closeup of an ex-West German SA 318C Alouette II Astazou's exposed Turbomeca Astazou IIA turboshaft engine

Data from Jane's All The World's Aircraft 1966–67

General characteristics

- Crew: 1
- Capacity: 4 passengers
- Length: 9.66 m (31 ft 8 in) (overall, blades folded)
- Height: 2.75 m (9 ft 0 in)
- Empty weight: 895 kg (1,973 lb)
- Max takeoff weight: 1,600 kg (3,527 lb)
- Fuel capacity: 580 L (150 US gal; 130 imp gal)
- Powerplant: 1 × Turbomeca Artouste IIC6 turboshaft, 400 kW (530 shp) derated to 269 kW (360 hp)
- Main rotor diameter: 10.20 m (33 ft 6 in)
- Main rotor area: 81.7 m^{2} (879 sq ft)

Performance

- Maximum speed: 185 km/h (115 mph, 100 kn) at sea level
- Cruise speed: 170 km/h (110 mph, 92 kn)
- Range: 565 km (351 mi, 305 nmi) (with maximum fuel)
- Endurance: 4.1 hours
- Service ceiling: 2,300 m (7,500 ft)
- Rate of climb: 4.2 m/s (820 ft/min)

== See also ==
Related development

- Aérospatiale Alouette III
- Aérospatiale Gazelle
- Aérospatiale SA 315B Lama

Related lists

- List of civil aircraft
- List of rotorcraft
- List of most-produced rotorcraft
