= Teledyne Turbine Engines =

American turbine engine manufacturer

- Type: Operating Division
- Predecessor: Continental Aviation and Engineering (CAE); TCM Turbine Engines
- Founded: 1940 (CAE)
- Headquarters: Toledo, Ohio
- Products: Small turbine engines
- Parent: Teledyne Technologies
- Website: www.teledyne.com/what-we-do/engineered-systems

Teledyne Turbine Engines (TTE) is a turbine engine manufacturer located in Toledo, Ohio. A division of Teledyne Technologies Inc., TTE is the successor to the former Teledyne CAE.

== History ==
In 1940, Continental Motors Corporation formed Continental Aviation and Engineering (CAE) to develop and produce aircraft engines of over 500 hp. It begins development of turbine engines during the 1940s, but none entered production.

From the 1950s-1970s, CAE built a licensed version of the Turbomeca Marboré as the Teledyne CAE J69.

In 1969, Teledyne Incorporated acquired Continental Motors Corporation, which became Teledyne Continental Motors (TCM). CAE was renamed Teledyne CAE, headquartered in Toledo, Ohio.

After the 1999 sale of Teledyne Ryan Aeronautical to Northrop Grumman, and the subsequent spin-off of Teledyne Technologies Inc. by Allegheny Teledyne in November that year, Teledyne CAE was renamed Teledyne Turbine Engines. In the next decade, it was placed under Teledyne Continental Motors as its TCM Turbine Engines division.

== Products ==
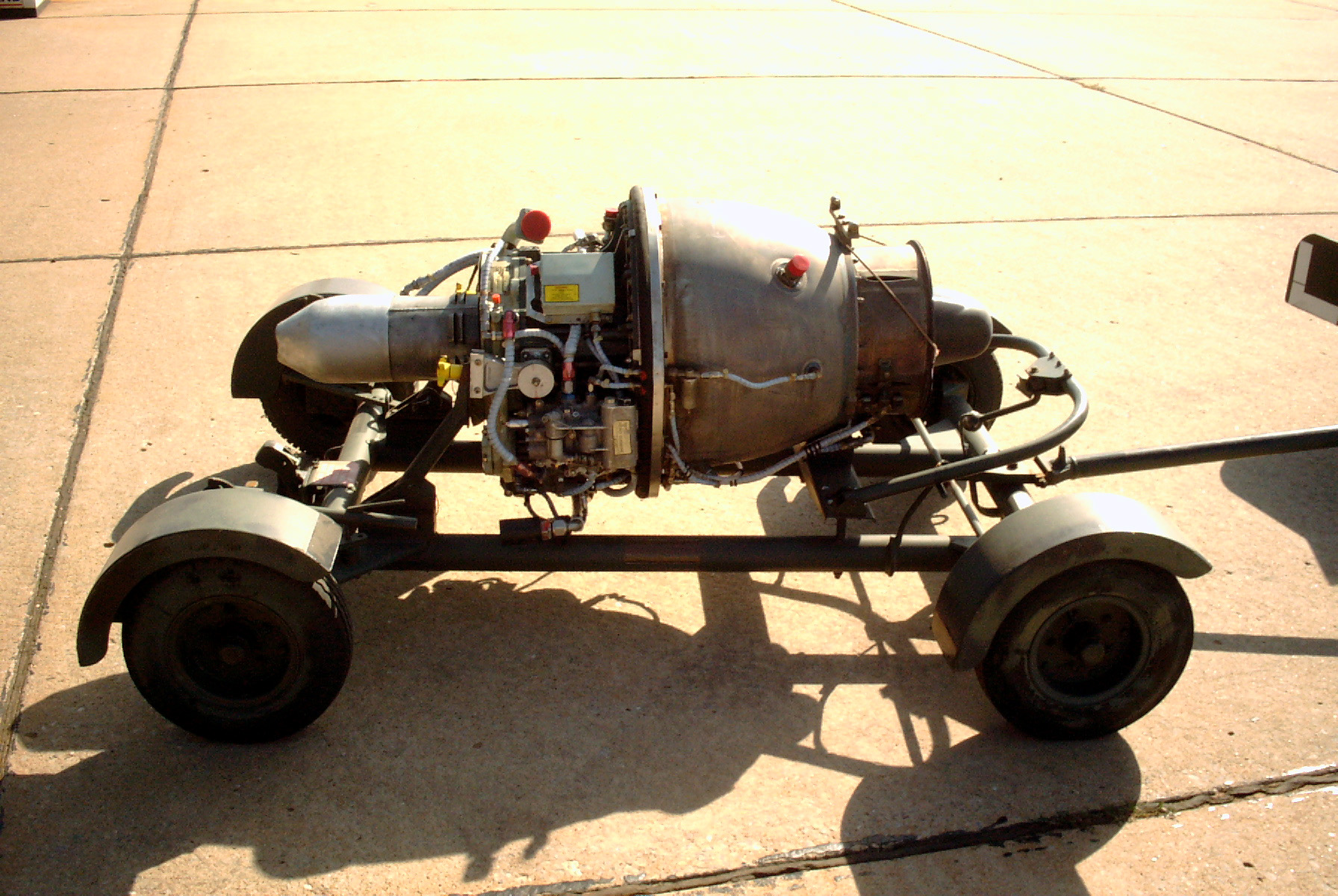
J69 turbojet, a licensed version of the Turbomeca Marboré II

=== Turbojet ===
Model name	Configuration	Power
Teledyne CAE J69	Turbojet	880 lbf
Teledyne CAE J100	Turbojet	2,800 lbf
Teledyne CAE J402	Turbojet	660 lbf
Teledyne CAE J700	Turbojet	
Continental Model 320	Turbojet	220 lbf

=== Turbofans ===
Model name	Configuration	Power
Teledyne CAE F106	Turbofan	
Teledyne Model 444	Turbofan	

=== Turboprop/turboshafts ===
Model name	Configuration	Power
Continental T51	Turboshaft	280 shp
Teledyne CAE T67	Turboshaft	1,540 shp
Teledyne CAE T72	Turboshaft	600 shp

=== Ramjets ===
Model name	Configuration	Power
Continental RJ35	Ramjet	
Continental RJ45	Ramjet	
Continental RJ49	Ramjet	
