= Bell H-13 Sioux =

Single-engine single-rotor light military helicopter

H-13 Sioux
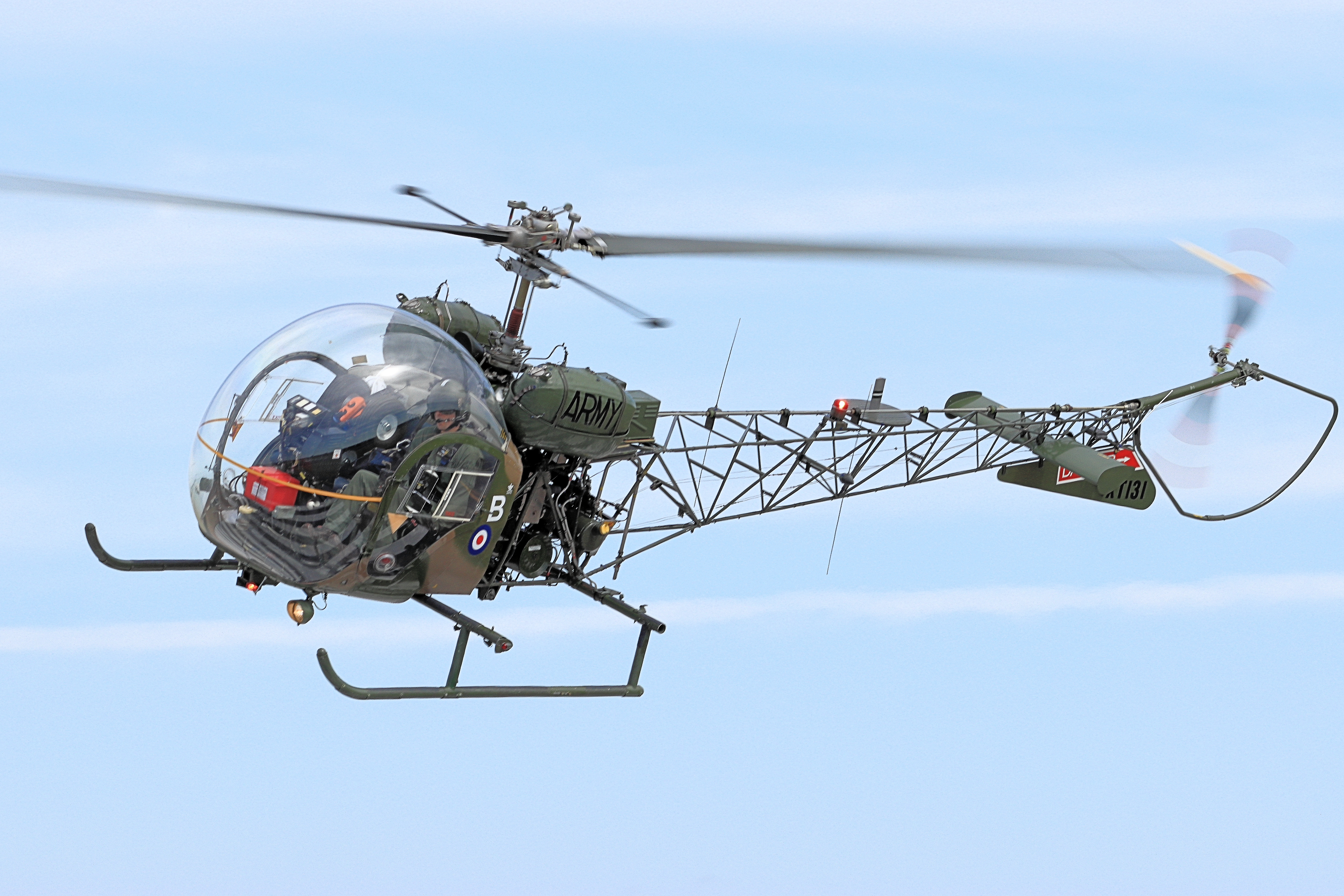
- An OH-13 over RIAT, 2022

General information
- Type: Light observation helicopter
- National origin: United States
- Manufacturer: Bell Aircraft; Bell Helicopter
- Status: Retired
- Primary users: United States Army United States Air Force; United States Navy; British Army
- Number built: At least 2,407

History
- First flight: 8 December 1945 (Bell 47 prototype)
- Developed from: Bell 47
- Variant: Bell 201
- Developed into: Bell 207 Sioux Scout

The Bell H-13 Sioux is an American single-engine light helicopter built and produced by Bell Helicopter for the military and licence-produced by Westland Aircraft for the British military as the Sioux AH.1 and HT.2. It was the first helicopter to be certified for civil use. The H-13 Sioux is named after the eponymous Native American ethnic group.

== Development ==
In 1947, the United States Army Air Forces (later the United States Air Force) ordered the improved Bell Model 47A. Most were designated YR-13 and three winterized versions were designated YR-13A. The United States Army first ordered Bell 47s in 1948 under the designation H-13. These would later receive the name Sioux.

Initially, the United States Navy procured several Bell 47s, designated HTL-1, between 1947 and 1958. The United States Coast Guard evaluated this model and procured two HTL-1s for multi-mission support in the New York Harbor. The most common U.S. Navy version of the 47 was designated the HTL-4, and dispensed with the fabric covering on the tail boom. The U.S. Coast Guard procured three HTL-5s in 1952 (similar to the HTL-4 but powered by a Franklin O-335-5 engine) and used these until 1960. The Coast Guard procured two of Bell's Model 47G and designated them HUL-1G in 1959.

The H-13 was one of the principal helicopters used by the U.S. Army during the Korean War, with the H-13D variant being the most prevalent. During the war it was used in a wide variety of roles including observation, reconnaissance, and medevac. From its role in medevac flights, it gained the nickname "Angel of Mercy". It was also used as an observation helicopter early in the Vietnam War, before being replaced by the Hughes OH-6 Cayuse in 1966.

The Bell 47 was ordered by the British Army as the Sioux to meet specification H.240, with licensed production by Westland Helicopters. In order to comply with the terms of its licence agreement with Sikorsky Aircraft, which prevented it building a U.S. competitor's aircraft, Westland licensed the Model 47 from Agusta, who had purchased a license from Bell. the first contract was for 200 helicopters. The first 50 helicopters of the contract were built by Agusta at Gallarate in Italy followed by 150 built by Westland at Yeovil. The first Westland Sioux made its maiden flight on 9 March 1965.

== Design ==
The Sioux is a single-engine, single-rotor, three-seat observation and basic training helicopter. In 1953, the Bell 47G design was introduced. It can be recognized by the full "soap bubble" canopy (as its designer Arthur M. Young termed it), exposed welded-tube tail boom, saddle fuel tanks and skid landing gear. In its UH-13J version, based on the Bell 47J, it had a metal-clad tail boom and fuselage and an enclosed cockpit and cabin.

The H-13 and its military variants were often equipped with medical evacuation panniers, one to each skid, with an acrylic glass shield to protect the patient from wind.

The development of the Sioux was helped greatly by Bell's implementation of a short weighted gyro-stabilizer bar beneath and perpendicular to the main rotor. It had streamlined counterweights at both tips and was linked so it determined which plane the rotor was in and kept it horizontal. The stabilizer, which was connected to the cyclic pitch control, acted as a hinged flywheel using gyroscopic inertia to keep the rotor blades in plane and independent of fuselage movement due to wind. It ensured that the system had enough inertia due to flight as well, so autorotation would function in case of engine failure.

A single 260 hp Lycoming VO-435 piston engine was fitted to the 47G variant. Fuel was fed from two high-mounted external tanks. A single two-bladed rotor with short inertial stabilizing minor blades was used on the Sioux.

== Variants ==
=== Military ===
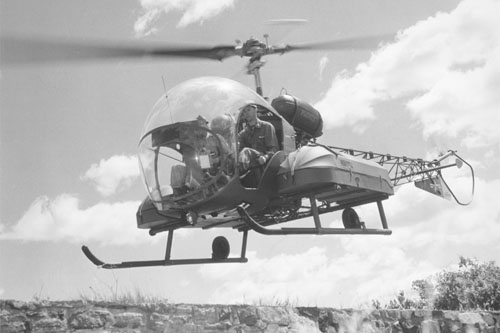
An H-13 with med-evac panniers

YR-13
(Note: In the military of the United States, the Bell 47 carried several designations prior to 1962. R-13 was the first designation by the United States Army Air Forces, while the Navy designated their training version as HTL. In 1948, the United States Air Force changed the designation to H-13 which was also adopted by the Army, adding the name Sioux. The Navy and Coast Guard designated utility models as HUL. In 1962, under a joint designation system created by the Department of Defense, the designations for all of the helicopters were changed to a mission symbol followed by the vehicle type designator creating a two-letter prefix (OH, UH, XH, etc.), but the Bell 47 retained its original series number, 13 and the Army's popular name. To denote different models, a letter suffix was appended to the designation.) 28 Bell 47A helicopters procured by the United States Army Air Forces for evaluation. The YR-13 was powered by a 175 hp (130 kW) Franklin O-335-1 piston engine. 10 of the aircraft were transferred to the U.S. Navy for evaluation as the HTL-1, with two HTL-1s later transferred to US Coast Guard.
YR-13A
3 YR-13 aircraft winterized for cold-weather testing in Alaska. Redesignated YH-13A in 1948.
HTL-2
US Navy equivalent of the commercial Model 47D. 12 built.
HTL-3
US Navy equivalent of the commercial Model 47E, powered by a 200 hp (149 kW) Franklin 6V4-200-C32 engine. Nine built.
H-13B
65 aircraft ordered in 1948 by the U.S. Army. All Army versions were later named Sioux.

A wounded soldier being loaded onto a Bell H-13 Sioux helicopter

YH-13C
One H-13B used as engineering testbed. Fitted with skid undercarriage and open, uncovered tailboom.
H-13C
16 H-13B aircraft converted to carry external stretchers in 1952, with skid landing gear and open tail boom of YH-13C.
H-13D
Army two-seat version based on commercial model 47D-1, with skid landing gear, stretcher carriers, and Franklin O-335-5 engine. 87 built.
OH-13E
H-13D configuration with three-seat aircraft with dual controls. 490 built.
XH-13F/Bell 201
Modified Bell 47G powered by a Continental XT51-T-3 (Turbomeca Artouste) turboshaft. The first Bell helicopter powered by a turbine engine.
OH-13G
Three-seater based on commercial model 47-G. Introduced a small elevator on the tailboom. 265 delivered to US Army.
OH-13H/UH-13H
Based on 47G-2. Equipped with a 250 hp (186 kW) Lycoming VO-435 engine. At least 453 acquired by US Army. UH-13Hs were used by the U.S. Air Force.
UH-13J
Two Bell 47J-1 Rangers acquired by the U.S. Air Force for VIP transport of the U.S. President. Originally designated H-13J.
OH-13K
Two converted H-13Hs with a larger diameter rotor and a 225 hp (168 kW) Franklin 6VS-335 engine for test evaluation.
TH-13L
Originally designated as the Navy HTL-4.
HTL-5
Utilized a Franklin O-335-5 engine.
TH-13M
Incorporated a small movable elevator. Originally designated as the Navy HTL-6.
HH-13Q
Originally the HUL-1G, it was used by the U.S. Coast Guard for search and rescue.
UH-13R
Powered by an Allison YT63-A-3 turboshaft engine. Original US Navy designation HUL-1M.
OH-13S
Three-seat observation helicopter based on 47G-3B to replace the OH-13H. 265 received by US Army.
TH-13T
Two-seat instrument trainer for the U.S. Army based on the 47G-3B-1, powered by 270 hp (201 kW) Lycoming TVO-435-D1B. 411 purchased.
Sioux AH.1
General purpose helicopter for the British Army, 50 built by Agusta (Agusta-Bell 47G-3B1) and 250 built by Westland (Westland-Agusta-Bell 47G-3B1). A small number also used by 3 Commando Brigade Air Squadron of the Royal Marines.
Sioux HT.2
Training helicopter for the Royal Air Force, 15 built by Westland.
H.7
(Thai: ฮ.๗) Royal Thai Armed Forces designation for the OH-13H.

=== Civil ===
Texas Helicopter M74 Wasp
Texas Helicopter Corporation single-seat conversion of OH-13E helicopters for agricultural use, powered by 200 hp (150 kW) Lycoming TVO-435-A1E engines. Certified 1976.
Texas Helicopter M74A
Texas Helicopter Corporation single-seat conversion of OH-13H helicopters for agricultural use, powered by Lycoming TVO-435 engine rated at 240 hp (180 kW) for 2 minutes. Certified 1977.
Texas Helicopter M79S Wasp II
Texas Helicopter Corporation conversion for agricultural use, with tandem seating and stub wing fuel tanks. Powered by Lycoming TVO-435 engine rated at 270 hp (200 kW) for 5 minutes.
Texas Helicopter M79T Jet Wasp II
Texas Helicopter Corporation conversion of Bell 47G helicopters for agricultural use, powered by 420 hp (310 kW) Soloy-Allison 250-C20S engines.

== Operators ==
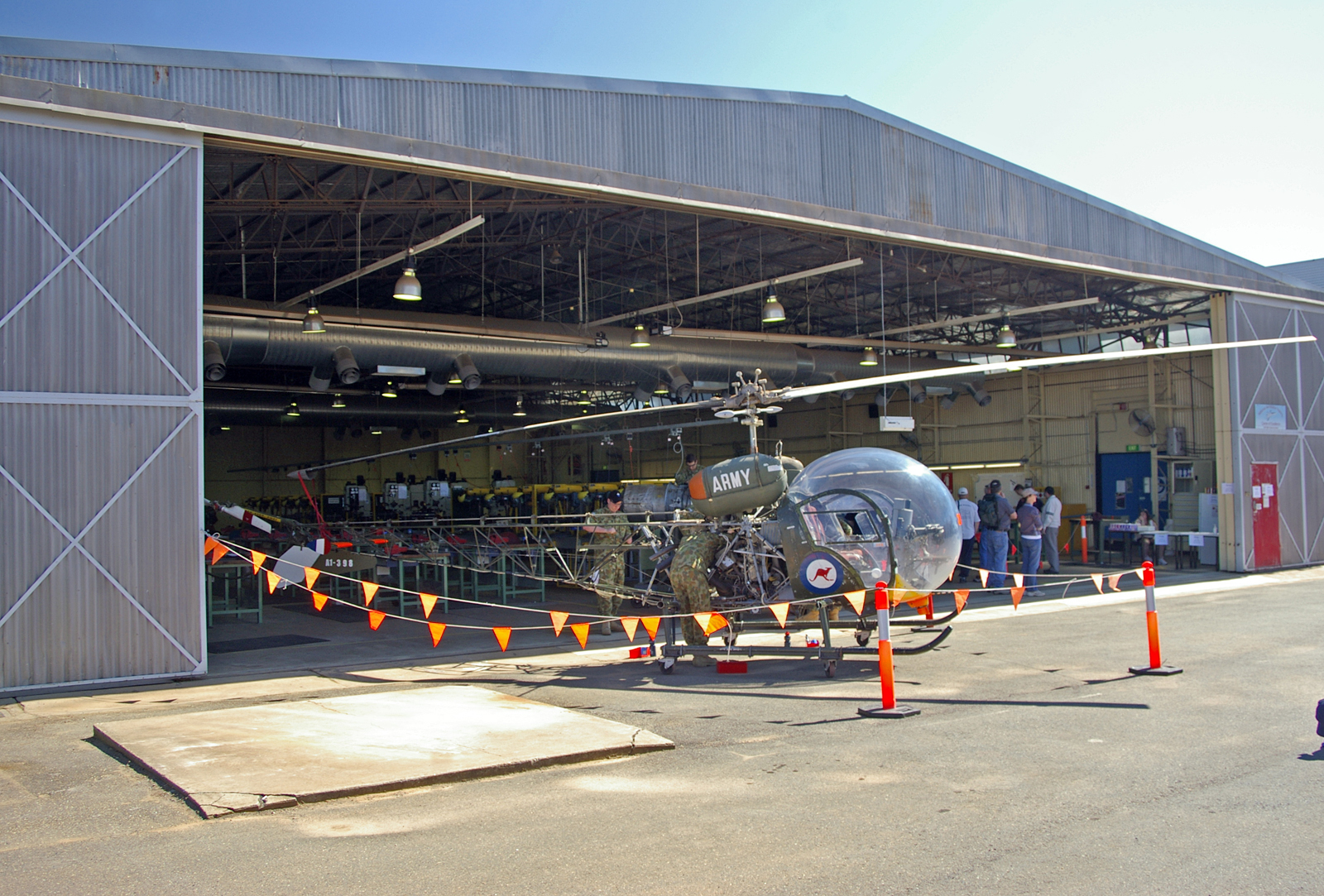
Australian Army A1 Bell 47G Sioux (A1-398) used for training at RAAF Base Wagga.

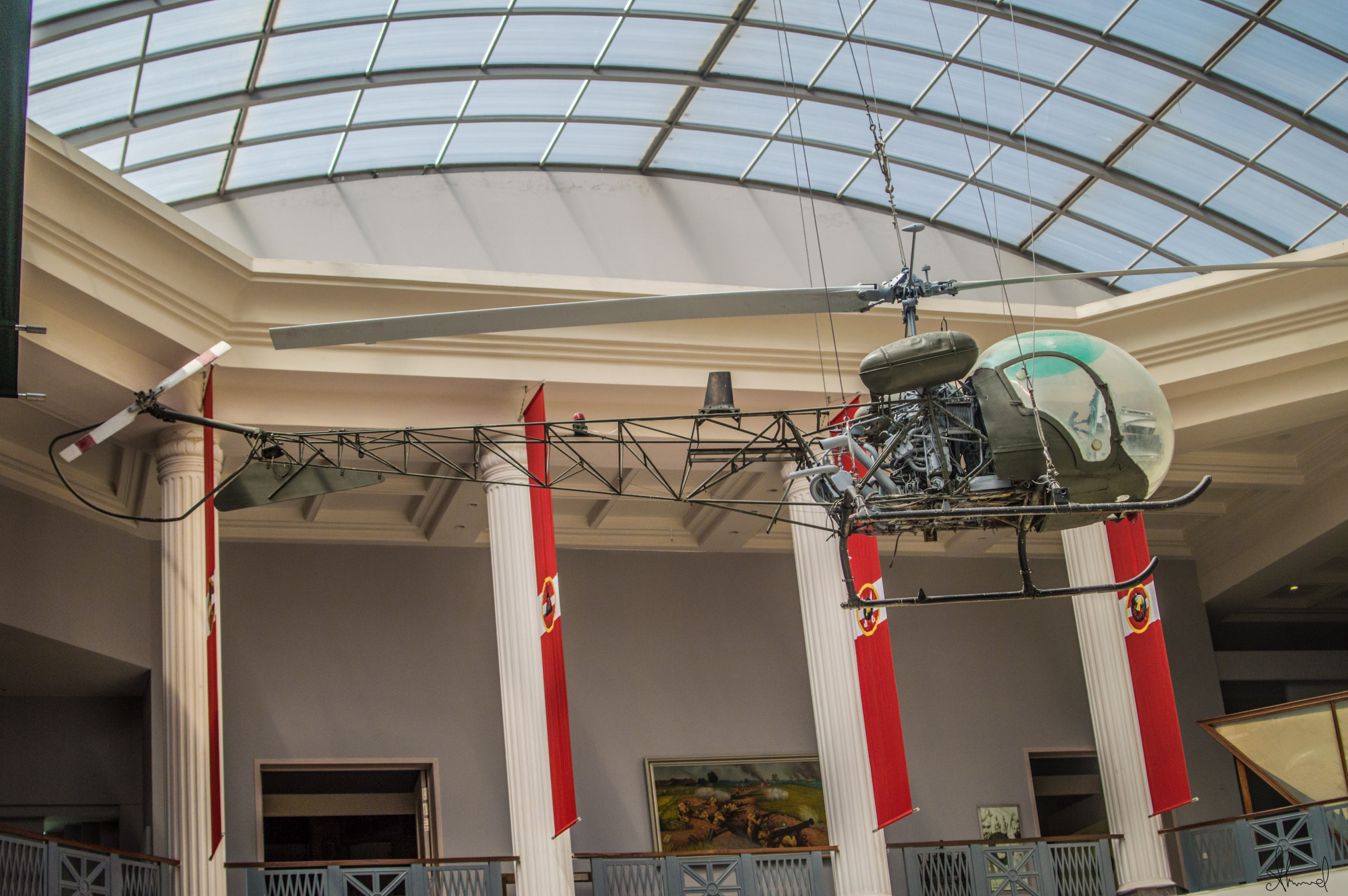
A hanging OH-13 at Pakistan Army Museum.

Argentina

- Argentine Army
- Argentine Navy
- Argentine Naval Prefecture

Australia

- Australian Army

Austria

- Austrian Air Force

Brazil

- Brazilian Air Force

Canada

- Royal Canadian Navy
  - VX-10 Squadron

Chile

- Chilean Navy

Colombia

- Colombian Air Force

Cuba

- Air Defense Force

Ecuador

- Ecuadorian Air Force

France

- French Air Force
- National Gendarmerie

Germany

- Bundesgrenzschutz
- German Army
- German Air Force

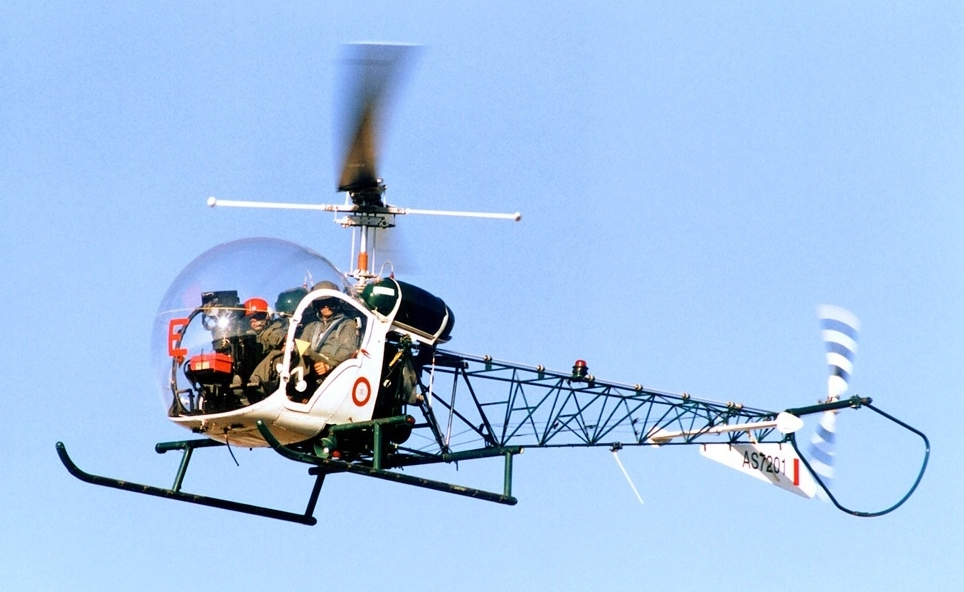
A Maltese Air Wing H-13

Greece

- Hellenic Air Force

Honduras

- Honduran Air Force

Iceland

- Icelandic Coast Guard

Indonesia

- Indonesian Air Force

India

- Indian Air Force

Italy

- Italian Air Force
- Italian Army
- Italian Navy

Jamaica

- Jamaica Defence Force

Japan

- Japan Ground Self Defence Force
- Japan Maritime Self Defence Force

Malaysia

- Royal Malaysian Air Force

Malta

- Maltese Air Wing Retired as of 2026.

Mexico

- Mexican Air Force
- Mexican Navy

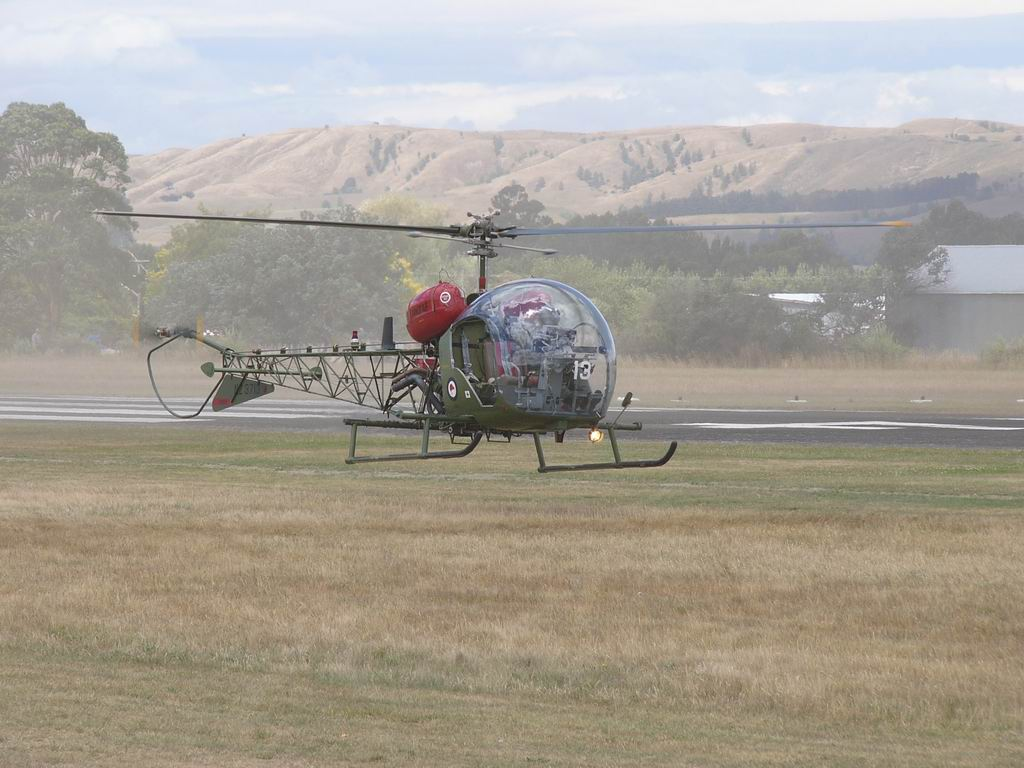
A RNZAF Sioux in 2009

New Zealand

- Royal New Zealand Air Force

Norway

- Royal Norwegian Air Force

Paraguay

- Paraguayan Air Force

Pakistan

- Pakistan Army Aviation Corps

Peru

- Peruvian Air Force
- Peruvian Navy

Philippines

- Philippine Air Force

Senegal

- Senegalese Air Force

South Vietnam

- South Vietnam Air Force operated several helicopters since April 1956.
  - 1st Helicopter Squadron
  - 2nd Helicopter Squadron

South Yemen

- People's Republic of Yemen Air Force

Spain

- Spanish Air Force
- Spanish Army
- Spanish Navy

Sri Lanka

- Sri Lanka Air Force
  - No.5 Squadron

Taiwan

- Republic of China Army

Thailand

- Royal Thai Air Force

Turkey

- Turkish Air Force

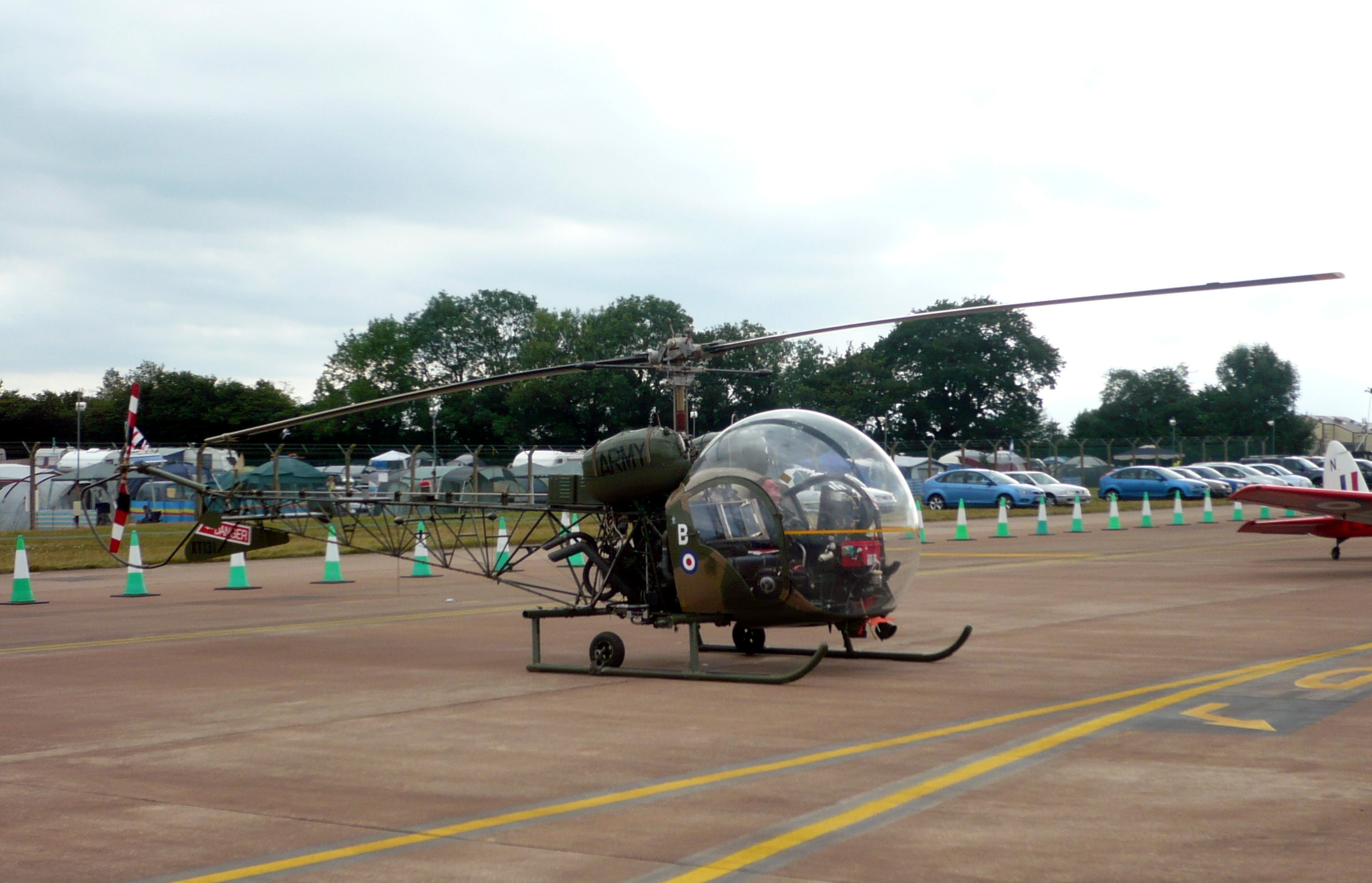
Agusta Sioux AH.1 of the British - Historic Army Aircraft Flight.

United Kingdom

- British Army Army Air Corps

United States

- United States Air Force
- United States Army
- United States Navy
- United States Coast Guard

Uruguay

- Uruguayan Air Force
- Uruguayan Naval Aviation

Venezuela

- Venezuelan Air Force

Zambia

- Zambian Air Force

== Surviving aircraft ==
=== Canada ===
- RCN 1387 – HTL-6 on static display at the Canada Aviation and Space Museum in Ottawa, Ontario.

=== Germany ===
- 58-5348 – OH-13H on static display at the Hubschraubermuseum Bückeburg in Bückeburg, Lower Saxony.
- XT548 – Sioux AH.1 on static display at the Flugausstellung Hermeskeil in Hermeskeil, Rhineland-Palatinate.

=== New Zealand ===
- H-13 Sioux (Bell 47-G3) registration NZ3705 Sioux on display at the Royal New Zealand Air Force Museum at Wigram. The aircraft is displayed in its RNZAF colour scheme when it was retired from service in 2012. NZ3705

=== Pakistan ===
- OH-13 on static display at the Pakistan Army Museum in Rawalpindi, Punjab.

=== South Africa ===
- XT562 – Bell 47 on static display at Port Elizabeth Branch of the South African Air Force Museum in Port Elizabeth, Eastern Cape.

=== South Korea ===
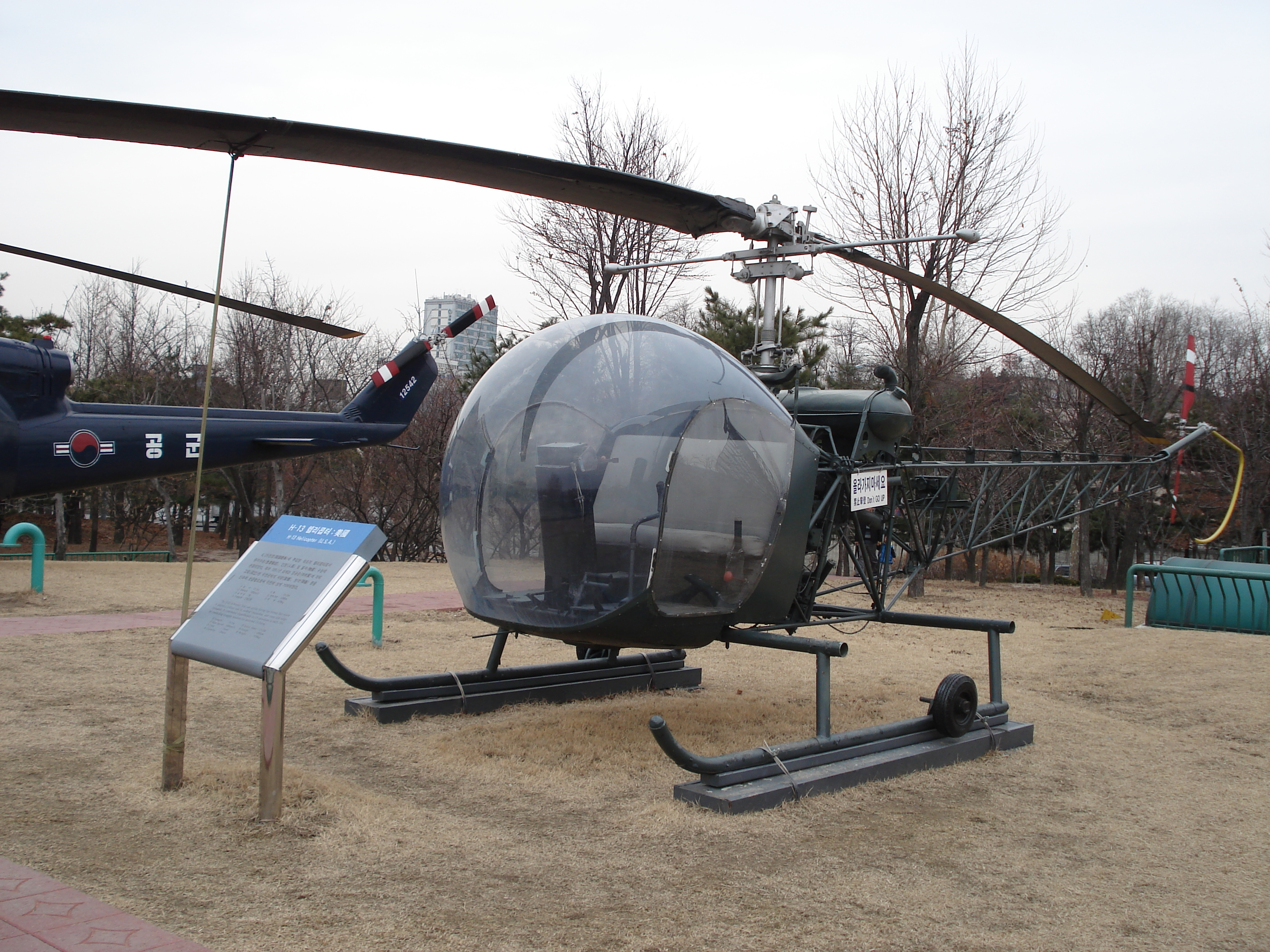
An H-13 on display at the War Memorial of Korea in Seoul.

- H-13 on static display at the War Memorial of Korea in Seoul.

=== Spain ===
- OH-13H on static display at the Aeronautical Laboratory of the School of Industrial and Aeronautical Engineering of the Polytechnic University of Catalonia in Terrassa, Barcelona.

=== Taiwan ===
- 1101 – OH-13H on display at Aviation Education Exhibition Hall, a subsidiary of the Republic of China Air Force Academy.
- 2110 – OH-13H on display at Longtan Sports Park at Taoyuan City, Taiwan.

=== Thailand ===
- 56-2182/H7-9/15 – OH-13H on display at the Royal Thai Air Force Museum in Bangkok, Thailand.

=== United Kingdom ===
Airworthy

- XT131 (G-CICN) - Sioux AH.1 airworthy with the Historic Army Aircraft Flight based at AAC Middle Wallop.

On display

- XT148 – Sioux AH.1 under restoration at the North East Land, Sea and Air Museums in Sunderland, Tyne and Wear.
- XT190 – Sioux AH.1 on static display at The Helicopter Museum in Weston-super-Mare, Somerset.
- XT200 – Sioux AH.1 on static display at the Newark Air Museum in Newark, Nottinghamshire.

=== United States ===
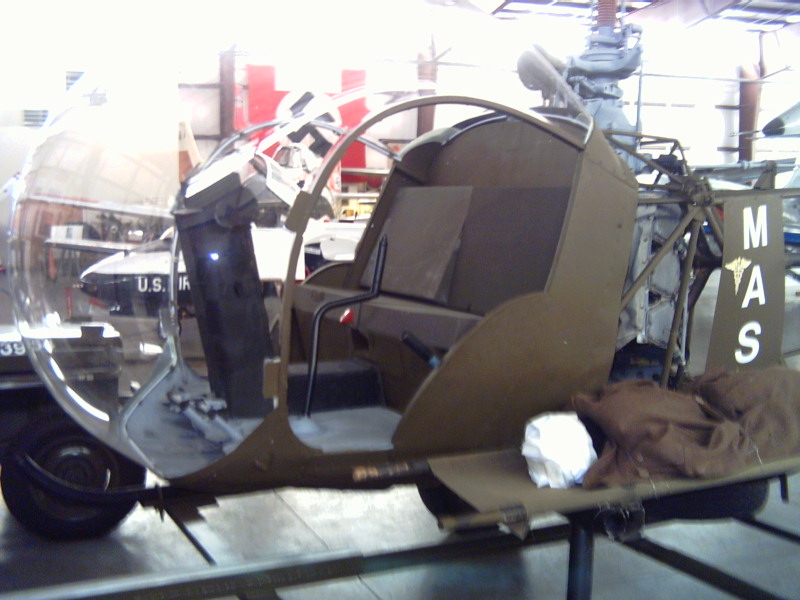
An H-13 in M*A*S*H paint scheme at Pueblo Museum.

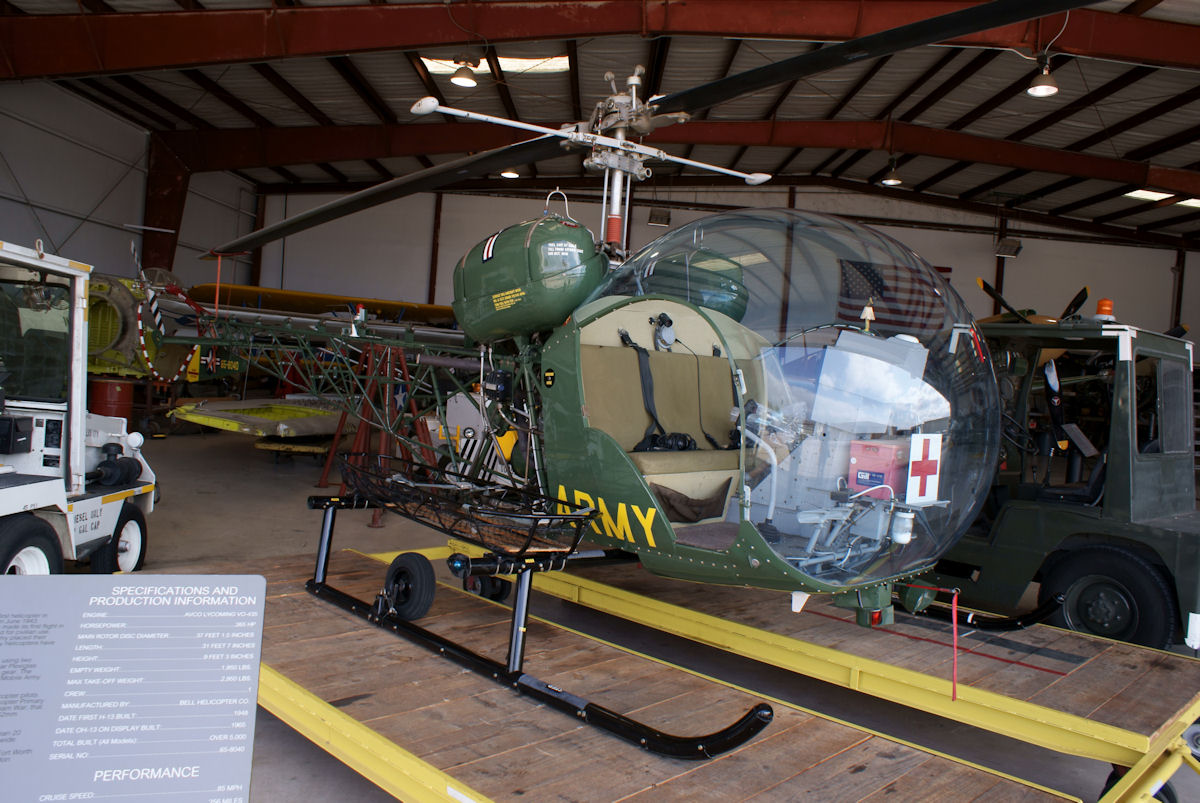
OH-13 at the Cavanaugh Flight Museum

Airworthy

OH-13H

- 58-1528 – operated by Ocean Air Inc. of Eugene, Oregon.

TH-13T

- 65-8040 – based at the Cavanaugh Flight Museum in Addison, Texas. It is painted as a H-13D. Removed from public display when the museum indefinitely closed on 1 January 2024. To be moved to North Texas Regional Airport in Denison, Texas.

On display

H-13B

- 48-0796 – South Carolina Military Museum in Columbia, South Carolina. It is the first H-13B airframe, serial number 101, and came off the production line in mid-July 1948.

H-13D

- 48-0845 – United States Army Aviation Museum in Enterprise, Alabama.

OH-13D

- 51-2456 - United States Army Medical Department Museum located on base at Fort Sam Houston, in San Antonio, Texas.

OH-13E

- 51-13934 – Evergreen Aviation & Space Museum in McMinnville, Oregon.
- 51-14010 – U.S. Army Transportation Museum at Joint Base Langley–Eustis near Newport News, Virginia.
- 51-14062 or 51-14077 – Aviation Hall of Fame and Museum of New Jersey in Teterboro, New Jersey.
- 51-14175 – Yanks Air Museum in Chino, California.
- 51-14193 – United States Army Aviation Museum in Enterprise, Alabama.
- 51-14218 – United States Army Aviation Museum in Enterprise, Alabama.

OH-13G

- 52-7833 – Wings of Freedom Aviation Museum in Horsham, Pennsylvania.

H-13H

- 58-1520 – South Dakota Air and Space Museum in Box Elder, South Dakota.

OH-13H

- 59-4949 - in use as instructional airframe at Portland Community College in Portland, Oregon.

UH-13H

- 56-2217 – Castle Air Museum in Atwater, California.

OH-13S

- 63-9085 – Texas Air & Space Museum in Amarillo, Texas. It wears a "M*A*S*H" paint scheme and is on loan from Amarillo College.
- 64-15338 – Flying Leatherneck Aviation Museum in San Diego, California.
- 64-15393 – Intrepid Sea, Air & Space Museum in New York, New York.

TH-13T

- 67-15963 – Pueblo Weisbrod Aircraft Museum in Pueblo, Colorado. It has a "M*A*S*H" paint scheme.
- 67-17053 – Hill Aerospace Museum in Ogden, Utah.

HTL-2

- 122952 – Pima Air & Space Museum in Tucson, Arizona.

HTL-4

- 128911 – National Museum of Naval Aviation in Pensacola, Florida.

HTL-6

- 142377 – National Museum of Naval Aviation in Pensacola, Florida.
- 142394 – Flying Leatherneck Aviation Museum in San Diego, California.

HTL-7

- 145842 – Pima Air & Space Museum in Tucson, Arizona.

Unknown

- Fantasy of Flight in Polk City, Florida has an airworthy XH-13F.
- U.S. Veterans Memorial Museum, Huntsville, Alabama has an H-13D on display.

== Specifications (Sioux AH.1) ==
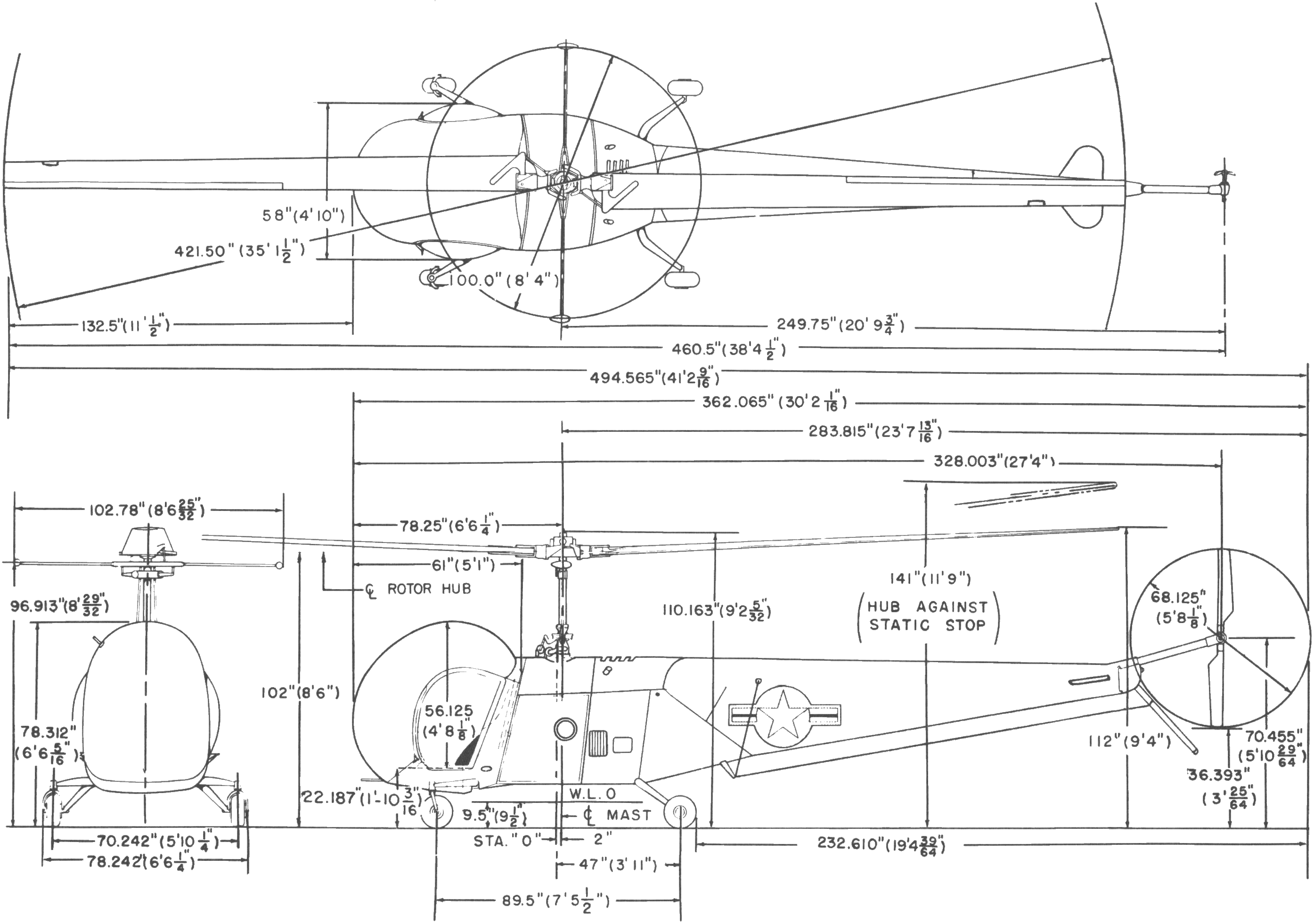
3-view line drawing of the Bell YR-13

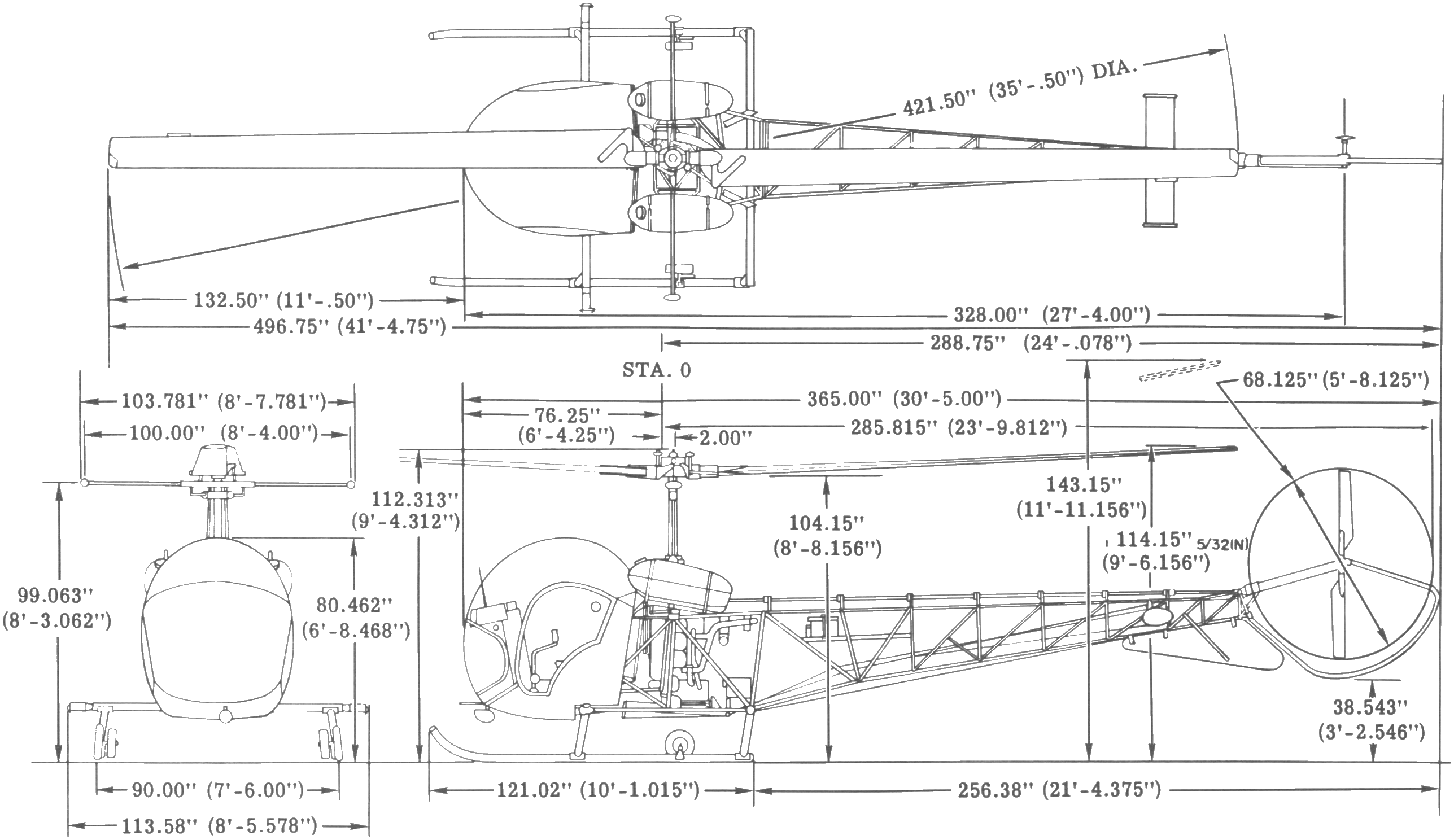
3-view line drawing of the Bell H-13G Sioux

Data from Newark Air Museum, Britains Small Wars.

General characteristics

- Crew: 1
- Capacity: 3
- Length: 31 ft 7 in (9.63 m)
- Height: 9 ft 8 in (2.95 m)
- Gross weight: 2,952 lb (1,339 kg)
- Powerplant: 1 × Lycoming TVO-435-A1A six-cylinder, horizontally opposed piston, 260 hp (190 kW)
- Main rotor diameter: 37 ft 0 in (11.28 m)

Performance

- Maximum speed: 105 mph (169 km/h, 91 kn)
- Cruise speed: 84 mph (135 km/h, 73 kn)
- Range: 273 mi (439 km, 237 nmi)
- Service ceiling: 16,100 ft (4,900 m)

Armament
Twin .30 in (7.62 mm) Machine guns (Note: The OH-1 was capable of carrying twin M37C .30 caliber machine guns, or twin M60 machine guns. They rarely did so however, because according to a Military Channel documentary on the AH-1 attack helicopter ("World's Deadliest Aircraft" series), the guns' recoil was too great a strain on the engines.)

== Popular culture ==
The H-13 has appeared, and played key roles, in many film and television productions. It has been associated with both the M*A*S*H TV series (1972–1983) and the film of the same name (1970), prominently featuring the H-13 in its opening credits, and played a central role in the series finale, which still holds the record as the highest rated single episode broadcast in America. The series helped popularize the H-13 as the helicopter most people now associate with the Korean War. The H-13 also played a key role in the Whirlybirds TV series (1957–1959).

== See also ==
Related development

- Agusta A.115
- Continental Copters El Tomcat
- H-13J Sioux
- Bell 207 Sioux Scout
- Kawasaki KH-4
- Meridionali/Agusta EMA 124

Aircraft of comparable role, configuration, and era

- Hiller OH-23 Raven
- Hughes TH-55 Osage
- Sikorsky S-300

Related lists

- List of most-produced rotorcraft
