= Kawasaki KH-4 =

Japanese light utility helicopter

KH-4
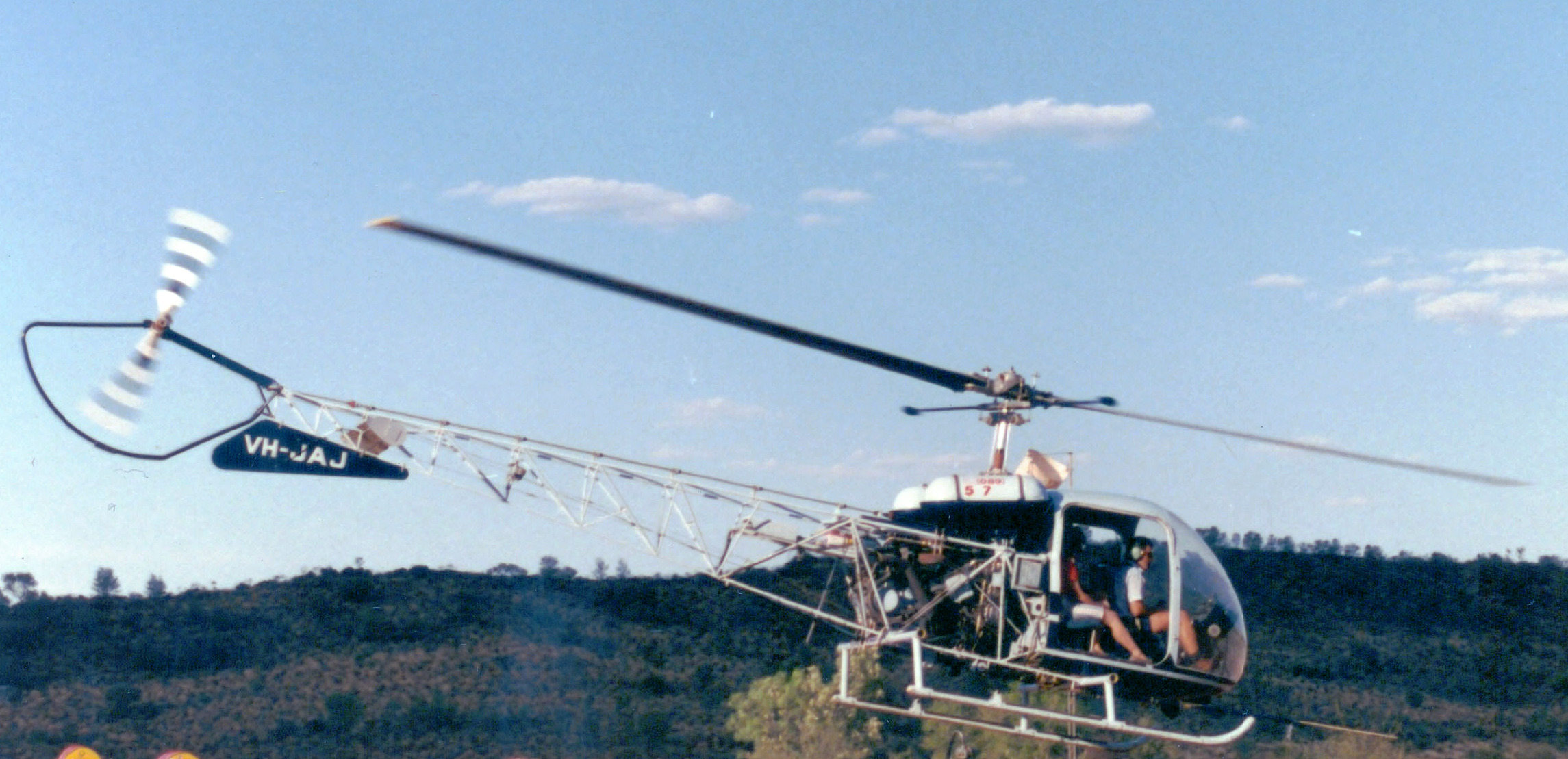
- A KH-4 at Glen Helen NT Australia.

General information
- Type: Utility helicopter
- National origin: Japan
- Manufacturer: Kawasaki
- Number built: 211

History
- First flight: August 1962
- Developed from: Bell 47

The Kawasaki KH-4 was a light utility helicopter produced in Japan in the 1960s as a development of the Bell 47 that Kawasaki had been building under licence since 1952. The most visible difference between the KH-4 and its forerunner was its new and enlarged cabin. This was fully enclosed, (although the side doors were removable), and provided seating for three passengers, side-by-side on a bench seat behind the pilot's seat. The helicopter was provided with a new control system, revised instrumentation, and larger fuel tank.

A total of 211 KH-4s were built, including four that were modified from existing Bell 47Gs. The vast majority of these were bought by civil operators, although some were purchased by the military forces of Japan and Thailand.

== Operators ==
Japan

- Japan Ground Self-Defense Force - 14
- Japan Maritime Self-Defense Force
- Maritime Safety Agency - 6

Thailand

- Royal Thai Air Force

== Specifications ==
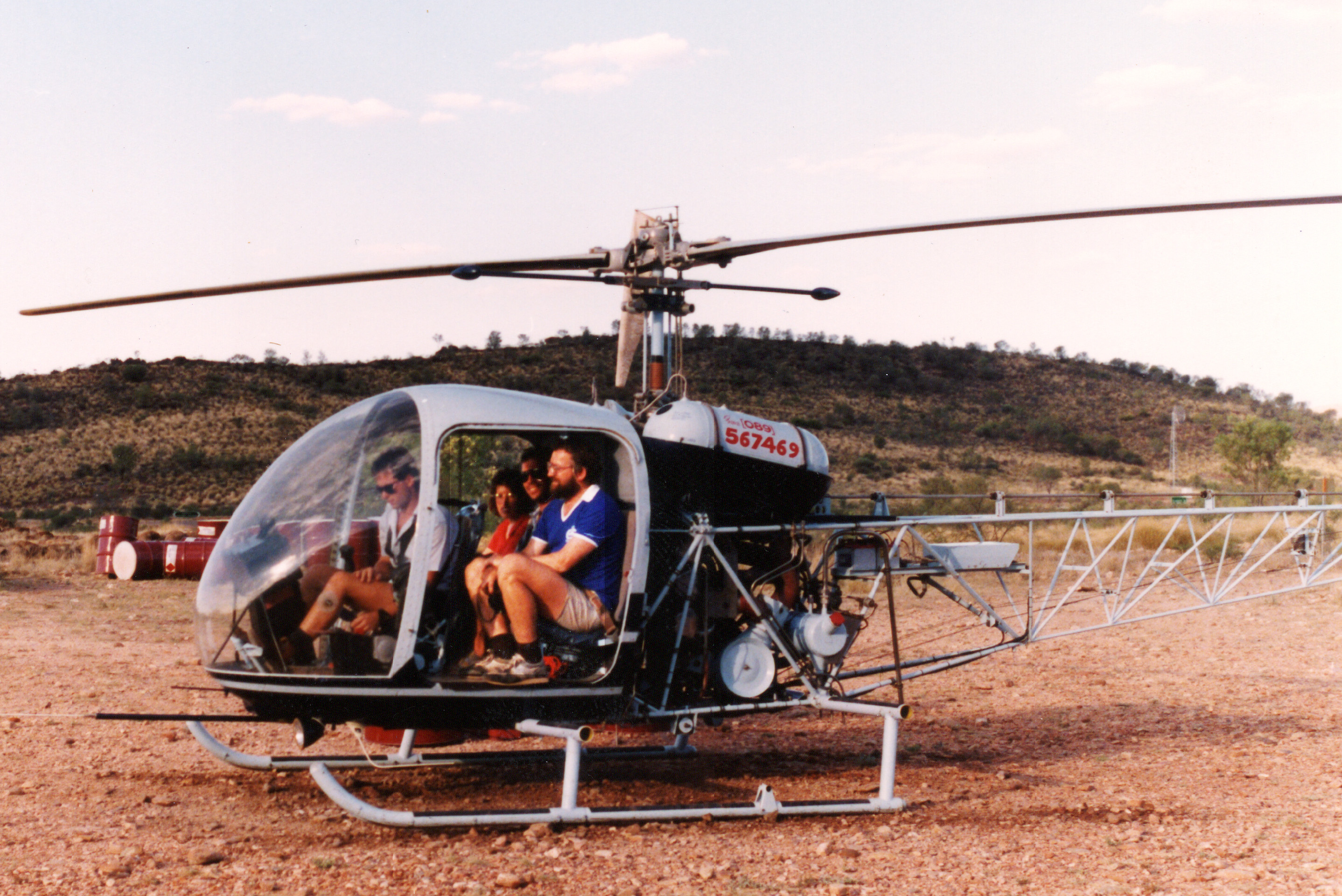
An Australian registered KH-4 in 2010.

Data from Jane's All The World's Aircraft 1966–67

General characteristics

- Crew: 1
- Capacity: 3 passengers
- Length: 13.30 m (43 ft 8 in) (overall length), 9.93 m (32 ft 7 in) (fuselage length)
- Height: 2.84 m (9 ft 4 in)
- Empty weight: 816 kg (1,799 lb)
- Max takeoff weight: 1,293 kg (2,851 lb)
- Powerplant: 1 × Lycoming TVO-435-B1A air-cooled six-cylinder horizontally-opposed engine, 200 kW (270 hp)
- Main rotor diameter: 11.32 m (37 ft 2 in)
- Main rotor area: 100.6 m^{2} (1,083 sq ft)

Performance

- Maximum speed: 169 km/h (105 mph, 91 kn)
- Cruise speed: 140 km/h (87 mph, 76 kn)
- Range: 400 km (250 mi, 220 nmi)
- Endurance: 4 hr 6 min
- Service ceiling: 5,640 m (18,500 ft)
- Rate of climb: 4.3 m/s (850 ft/min)

== See also ==
Related development

- Agusta A.115
- Bell 47
- Bell 47J Ranger
- Meridionali/Agusta EMA 124

Aircraft of comparable role, configuration, and era

- Canadian Home Rotors Safari
- Hiller OH-23 Raven
- Hughes TH-55 Osage
- Sikorsky S-300
