= Bell 47 =

1945 utility helicopter family by Bell

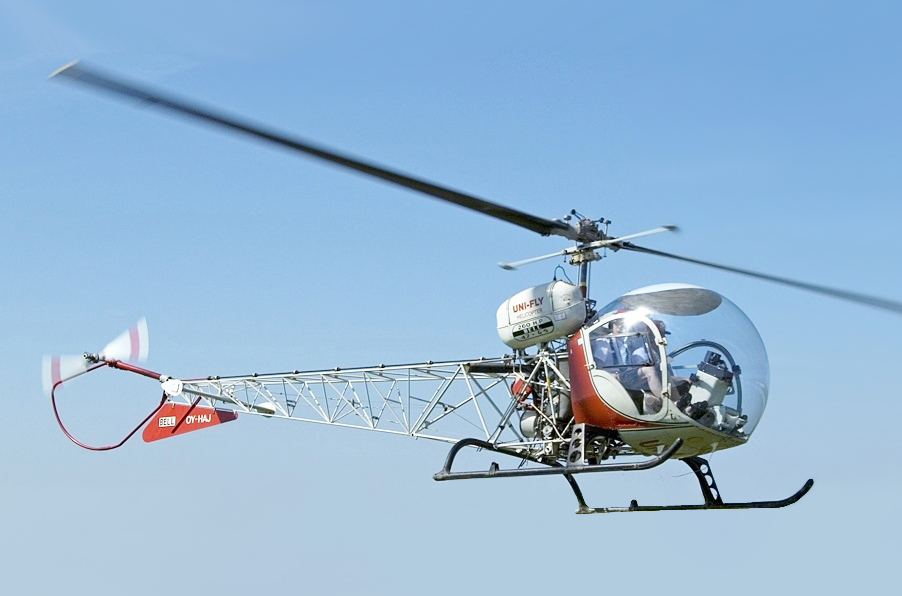
- Bell 47G

General information
- Type: Multipurpose light helicopter
- National origin: United States
- Manufacturer: Bell Aircraft; Bell Helicopter
- Designer: Arthur M. Young
- Primary users: United States Army British Army
- Number built: 5,600

History
- Manufactured: 1946–1974
- Introduction date: 1946
- First flight: December 8, 1945
- Developed from: Bell 30
- Variants: Bell H-13 Sioux; Bell 47J Ranger; Kawasaki KH-4

The Bell 47 is a single-rotor single-engine light helicopter manufactured by Bell Helicopter. It was based on the third Bell 30 prototype, which was the company's first helicopter designed by Arthur M. Young. The 47 became the first helicopter certified for civilian use on 8 March 1946. The first civilian delivery was made on 31 December 1946 to Helicopter Air Transport. More than 5,600 Bell 47s were produced, including those under license by Agusta in Italy, Kawasaki Heavy Industries in Japan, and Westland Aircraft in the United Kingdom. The Bell 47J Ranger is a modified version with a fully enclosed cabin and tail boom.

== Design and development ==
Early models varied in appearance, with open cockpits or sheet metal cabins, fabric covered or open structures, some with four-wheel landing gear. Later model D and Korean War H-13D and E types settled on a more utilitarian style. The most common model, the 47G introduced in 1953, can be recognized by the full "soap bubble" canopy, exposed welded-tube tail boom, saddle fuel tanks and skid landing gear. The 47G was released as a number of sub-variants and some sub-variants were available in a narrow bubble (55 inches wide) and wide bubble (60 or 63 inches wide).

The later three-seat 47H had an enclosed cabin with full cowling and monocoque tail boom. It was an attempt to market a "luxury" version of the basic 47G. Relatively few were produced.

Engines were Franklin or Lycoming vertically mounted piston engines of 175 to 305 HP (130 to 227 kW). Seating varied from two (early 47s and the later G-5) to four (the J and KH-4).

In April 2011 there were 1068 registered with the Federal Aviation Administration in the United States and 15 in the United Kingdom.

Bell 47s were produced in Japan by a Bell and Kawasaki venture; this led to the Kawasaki KH-4 variant, a four-seat version of the Model 47 with a cabin similar to the Bell 47J. It differed from the "J" in having a standard uncovered tail boom and fuel tanks like the G series. It was sold throughout Asia, and some were used in Australia.

In February 2010, the Bell 47 type certificates were transferred to Scott's Helicopter Services. The sister company that was formed, Scott's – Bell 47, was in the process of starting production of a turboshaft powered version of the Bell 47, the 47GT-6, using a Rolls-Royce RR300 engine and with composite rotor blades, with deliveries planned from 2016. However, development appears to have stalled, and as of 2025, no production models have appeared, and the company's website has made no mention of it since 2013.

== Operational history ==
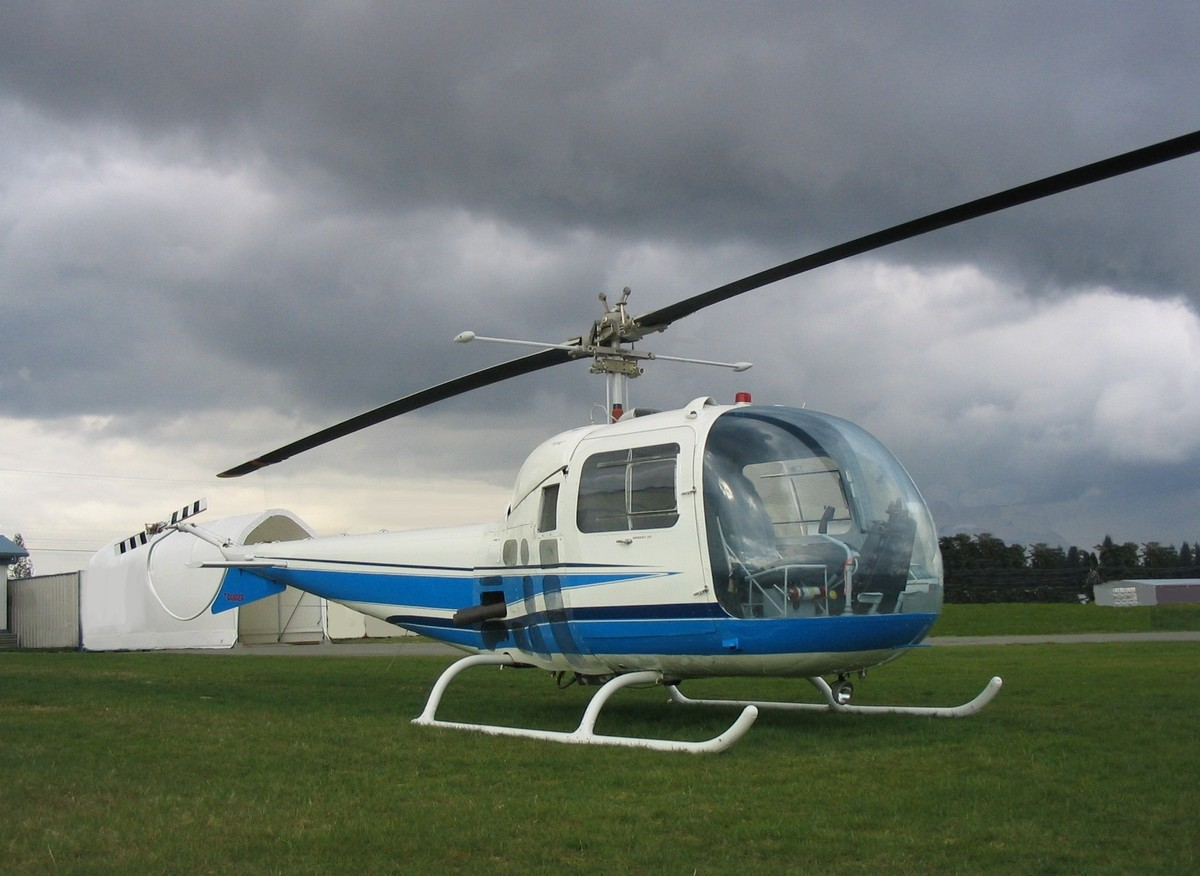
Bell 47J Ranger

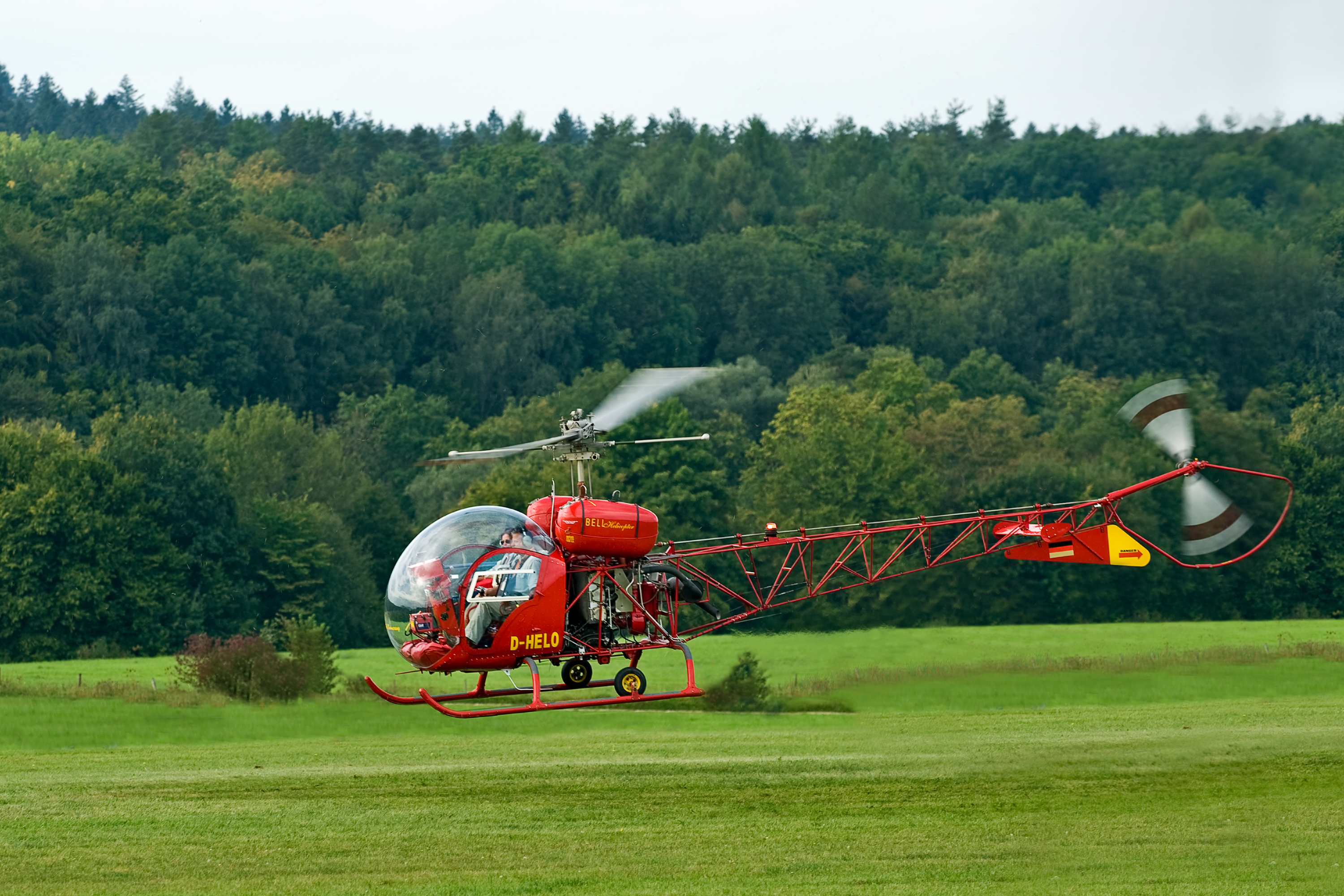
Bell 47 in Germany, 2011

The Bell 47 entered US military service in late 1946, and operated in a variety of versions and under different designations for three decades. It was designated H-13 Sioux by the US Army, and during the Korean War, it served a variety of roles, including reconnaissance and scouting, search and rescue, and medevac.

The "Telecopter" was a Bell 47 rented by television station KTLA in Los Angeles, California. It was outfitted with a television camera and it made the world's first flight by a television news helicopter on July 3, 1958, with its inventor, John D. Silva, aboard. When the television station reported it was receiving no video, Silva exited the helicopter's cockpit to climb onto its landing skid while it hovered at 1,500 feet (457 m) so he could investigate the microwave transmitter bolted to its side, where he discovered a vacuum tube had failed due to vibration and hot weather. After Silva fixed the problem overnight, the Telecopter made the world's first successful television news flight on July 4, 1958.

The National Aeronautics and Space Administration (NASA) had a number of Bell 47s during the Apollo program, used by astronauts as trainers for the lunar lander. Apollo 17 commander Gene Cernan had a nearly disastrous crash into the Indian River in Florida in 1971, before his flight to the Moon. The 47 has also served as the helicopter of choice for basic helicopter flight instruction in many countries.

=== Records ===
- 13 May 1949, a Bell 47 set an altitude record of 18,550 feet (5,650 m).
- 21 September 1950, first helicopter to fly over the Alps.
- 17 September 1952, Bell pilot Elton J. Smith set a world distance record for piston helicopters of 1,217 miles (1,959 km) by flying nonstop from Hurst, Texas, to Buffalo, New York. As of 2018, this record still stands.

== Variants ==
Section source: Complete Encyclopedia

=== Civilian ===
47
Pre-production version, powered by a 178 hp (133 kW) Franklin piston engine. Ten pre-production examples built, which varied in appearance.
47A
Improved version of the Bell 47, powered by a 175 hp (130 kW) Franklin O-335-1 piston engine.

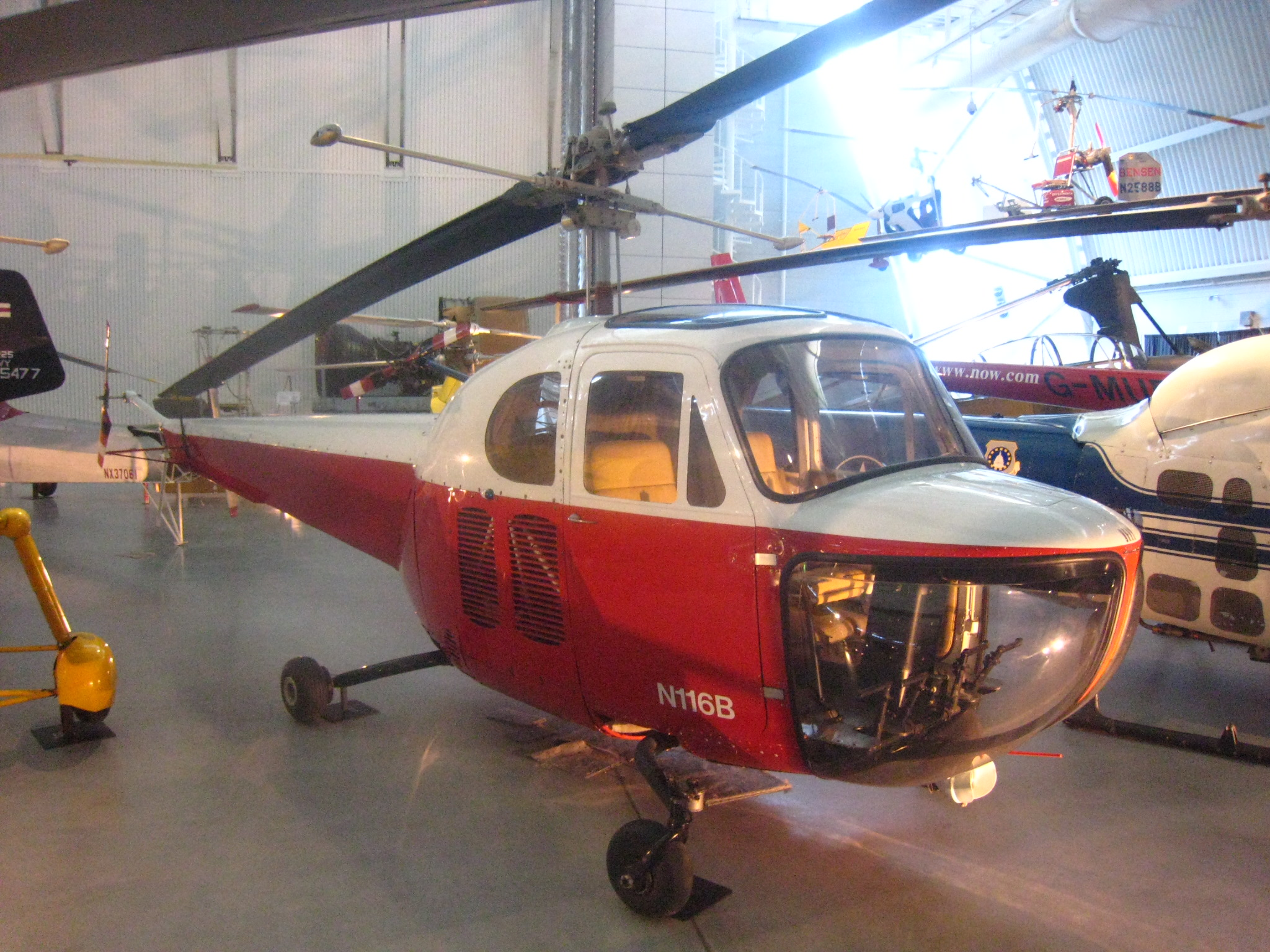
A 47B on display at the Steven F. Udvar-Hazy Center, 2011

47B
Equivalent to the military YR-13/HTL-1, powered by the 175 hp (130 kW) Franklin O-335-1.

47B-3
Agricultural/utility version with open crew positions. Also, offered in a version to the US Postal Service as the Bell Airmailer.

47C
47D
First to appear with a molded "soap bubble" canopy.

47D-1
Introduced in 1949, it had an open tubework tail boom reminiscent of the Bell Model 30 and three seats.

47E
Powered by a 200 hp (150 kW) Franklin 6V4-200-C32 engine.
47F

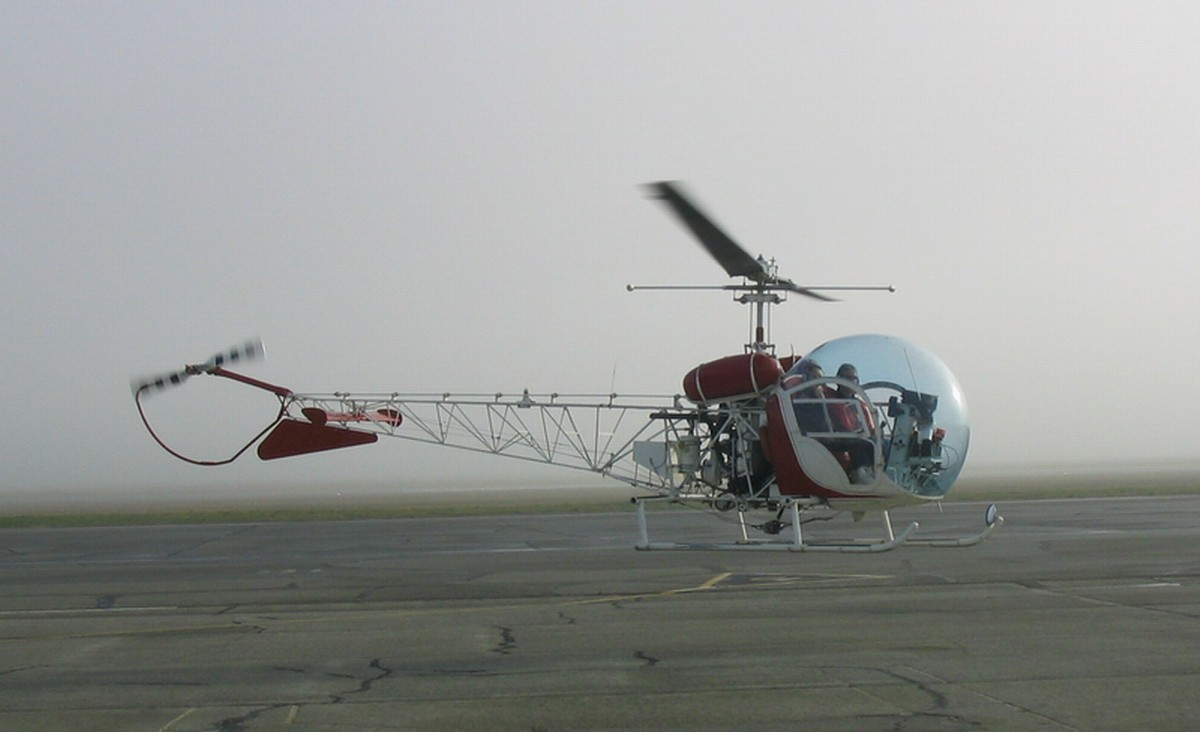
Bell 47G

47G
Combines a 200 hp (149 kW) Franklin engine with the three-seat configuration of the 47D-1 and introduced the twin saddle-bag fuel tank configuration.

47G-2
Powered by the Lycoming VO-435 engine. Produced under license by Westland Aircraft as the Sioux for the UK military.
47G-2A
Powered by a 240 hp (179 kW) VO-435.
47G-2A-1
Wider cabin, improved rotor blades and increased fuel capacity. Also licence built in Italy by Agusta.
47G-2A-1 Wing Ding
An experimental compound helicopter, developed by Bell in 1963.
47G-3
Powered by a supercharged 225 hp (168 kW) Franklin 6VS-335-A.
47G-3B
Powered by a turbocharged 280 hp (209 kW) Lycoming TVO-435.
47G-4
Three-seat helicopter powered by an Avco Lycoming VO-540 engine.
47G-5
A three-seat utility version. A two-seat agricultural version was later known as the Ag-5. The 47G-5 remained in production even after H & J production had ended.

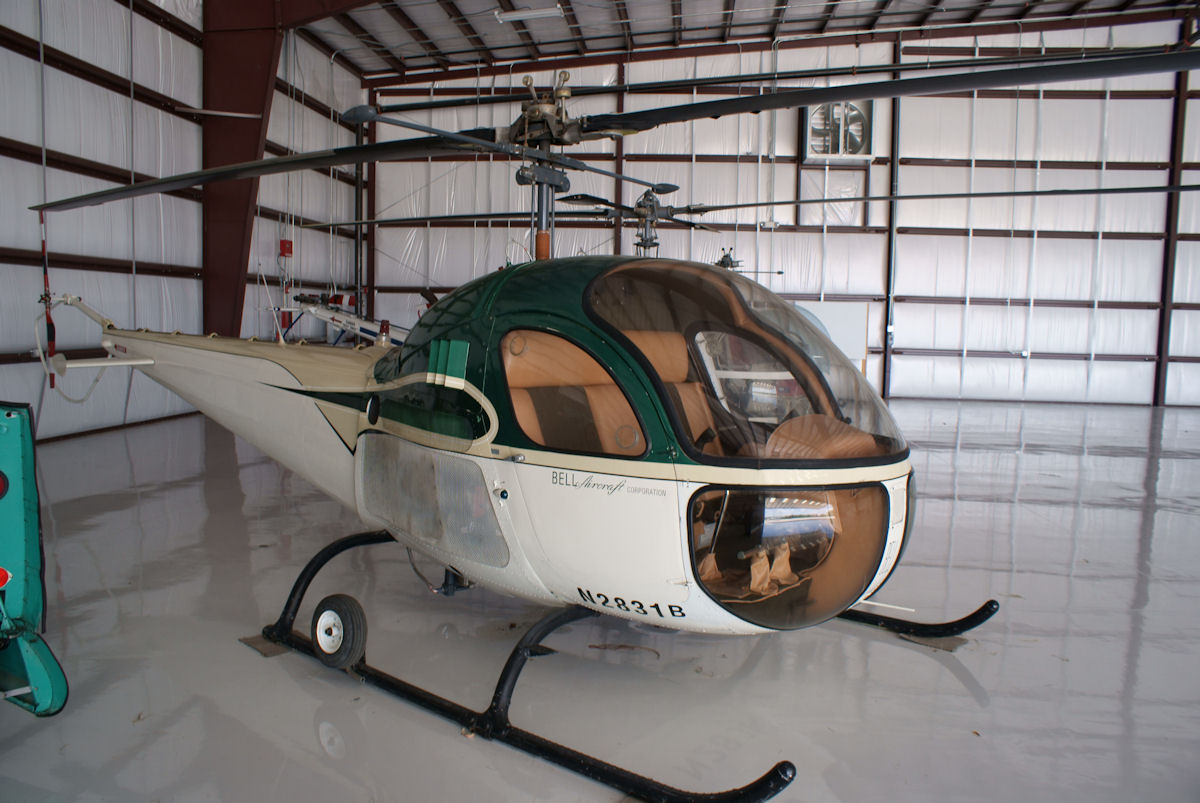
A Bell 47H-1

Bell 47H-1
A three-seat version with an enclosed cabin and fuselage.
47J Ranger
A four-seat version powered by a VO-435 engine.
47K
Military two-seat training variant of the 47J.

=== Military ===
See H-13 Sioux

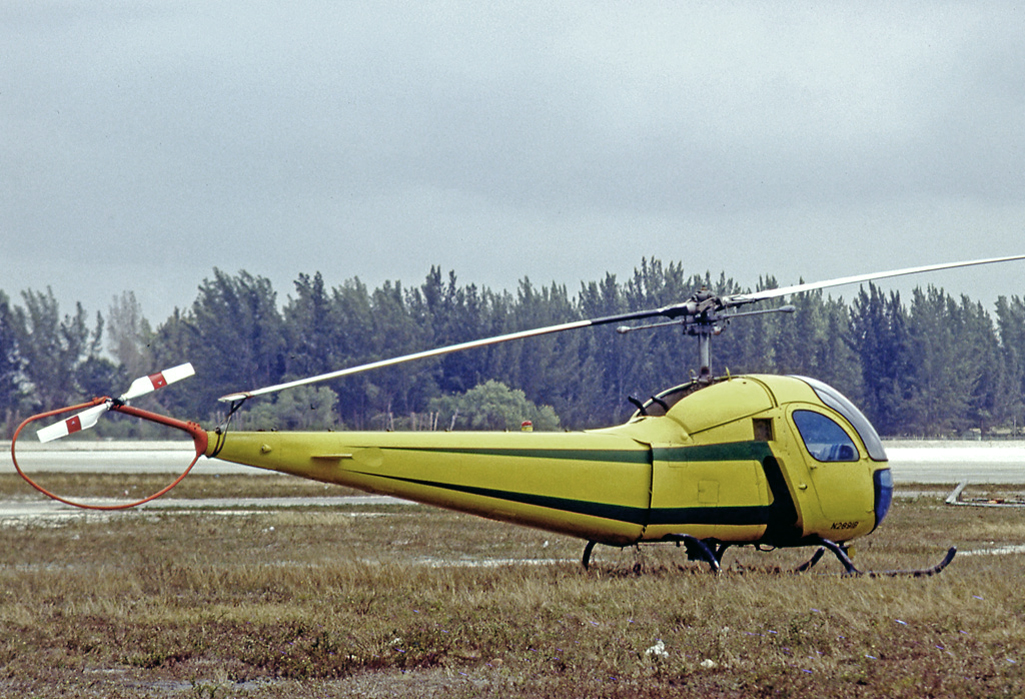
1957 47H-1

IH-1
Brazilian Navy designation of the Model 47G.
IH-1A
Brazilian Navy designation of the Model 47D-1.
H.PhT.2
(Thai: ฮ.ผฑ.๒) Royal Thai Armed Forces designation for the Kawasaki-built Model 47G-3B-114.

=== Licensed versions ===
Agusta A.115 1971 Italian prototype of a Bell 47J with an unclad, tubular tail boom, and powered by a Turbomeca Astazou II turboshaft engine Meridionali/Agusta EMA 124 Italian prototype with redesigned forward fuselage. Not produced.

Kawasaki KH-4 Japanese production version with redesigned, lengthened cabin, and redesigned control system

=== Conversions ===
Carson Super C-4 El Tomcat Mk.II Bell 47G-2 modified extensively for agricultural spraying by Continental Copters Inc. First flew in April 1959, followed by further improved versions.

== Operators ==
=== Military operators ===
For all military operators, regardless of the actual model, see Bell H-13 Sioux operators

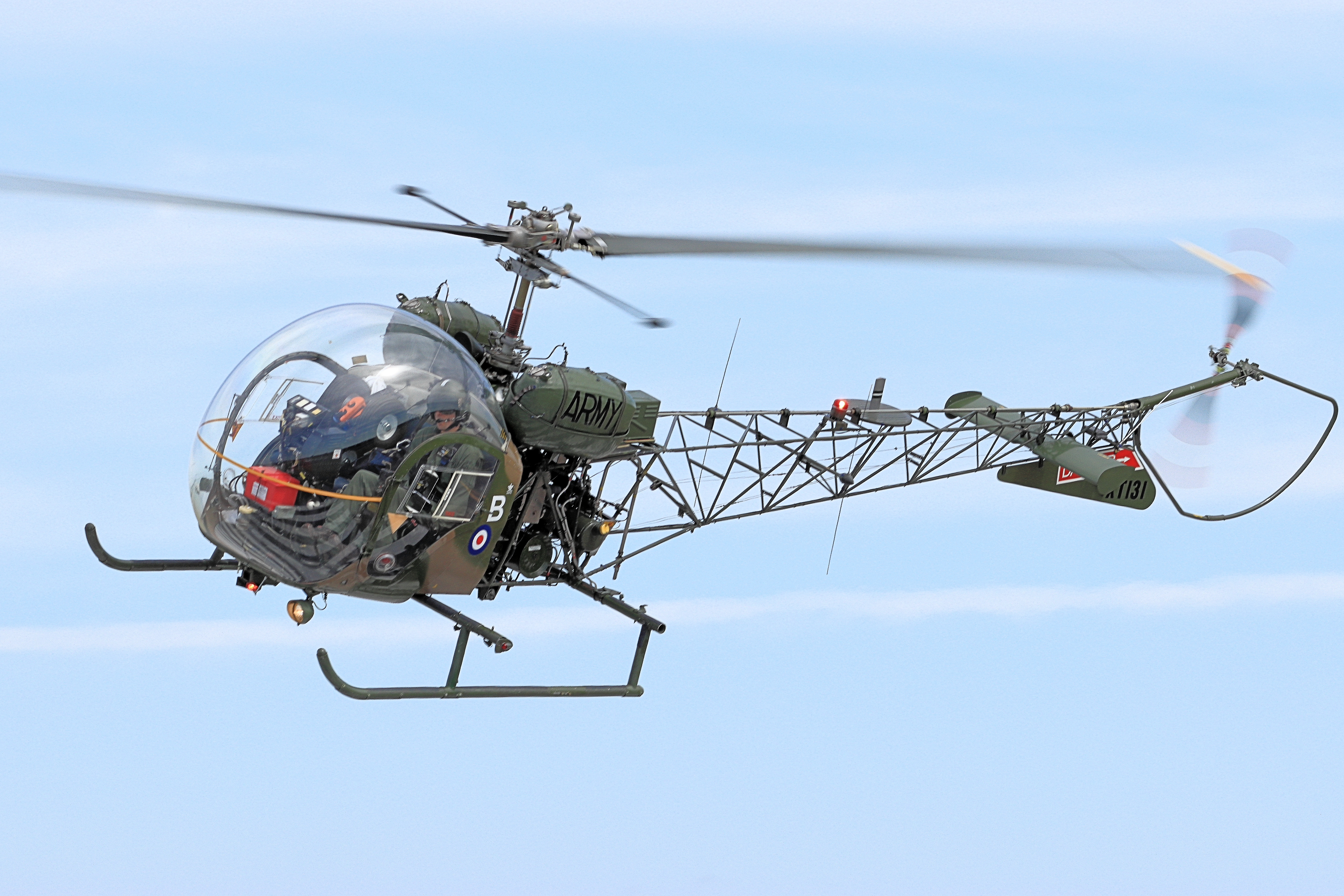
Bell 47 in Army livery, 2022

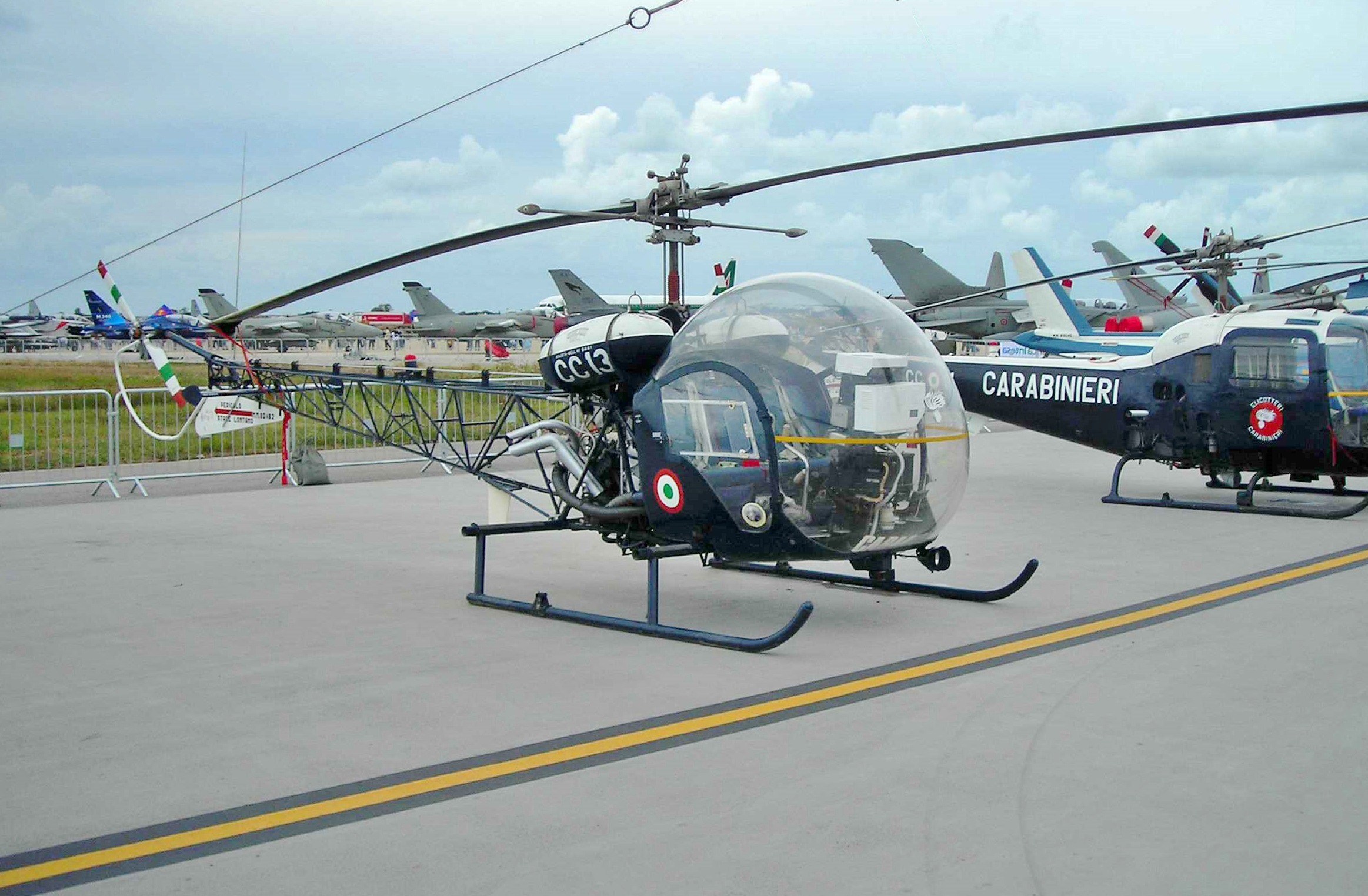
An Agusta-Bell 47G of the Italian Carabinieri

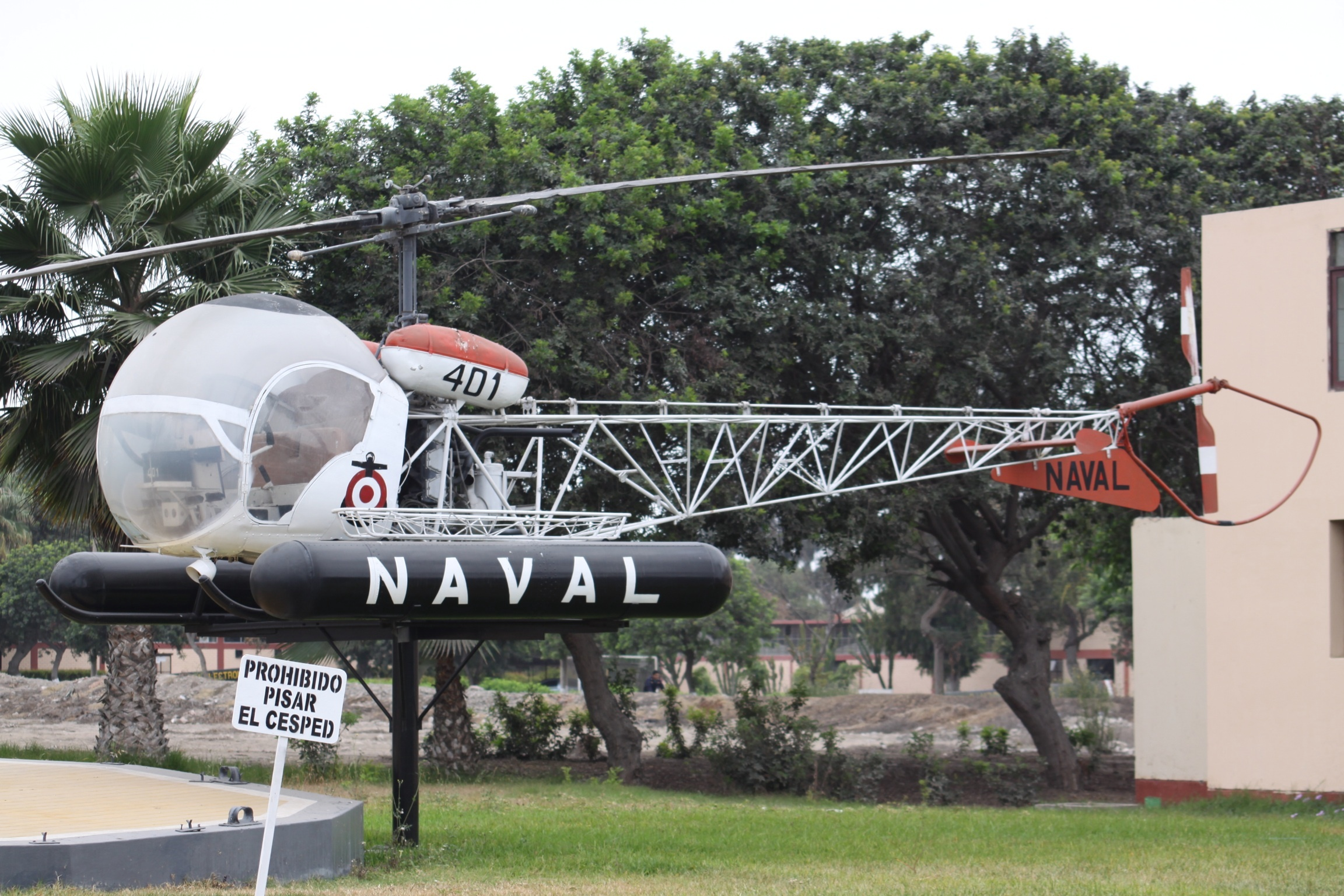
A retired Bell 47 of the Peruvian Navy, now on display

=== Government operators ===
Canada

- Ontario Lands and Forests

Italy

- Carabinieri
- Guardia di Finanza
- Vigili del Fuoco

United States

- Los Angeles City Fire Department
- Los Angeles Police Department
- New York City Police Department

== Aircraft on display ==
Argentina

- Unknown ID – Bell 47D, restored as registration 2-HE-3, on static display at the Naval Aviation Museum in Bahía Blanca, Buenos Aires.

Canada

- CF-ODM – Bell 47D-1 on static display at the Canadian Bushplane Heritage Centre in Sault Ste. Marie, Ontario.
- Unknown ID – Bell 47G on static display at the Alberta Aviation Museum in Edmonton, Alberta. It was assembled from parts and represents a Bell 47D.
- CF-NHH – Bell 47G on static display at The Hangar Flight Museum in Calgary, Alberta. It was built by college students from parts and has never flown.
- CF-GWD – Bell 47D-1 on display at the Canadian Museum of History, Gatineau, Quebec.
- CF-FZX – Bell 47G-4 on display at the British Columbia Aviation Museum.
- C-FIVE – Bell 47J-2 on display at the Canadian Museum of Flight, Langley, British Columbia.

Chile

- H-03 (Chilean Air Force) – Bell 47D-1 on static display at the Museo Nacional Aeronáutico y del Espacio in Santiago.

France

- 710 (French Air Force) – Bell 47G on static display at the Musée de l’air et de l’espace in Le Bourget, Île-de-France.

Germany

- AS+058 (German Army) – Agusta-Bell 47G-2 on static display at the Deutsches Museum in Munich, Bavaria.

Japan

- JA7008 – Kawasaki-Bell 47D-1 (one of first two aircraft of All Nippon Airways) on static display at ANA Safety Education Center, nearby Haneda Airport. It was once displayed at Transportation Museum of Japan until its closure in 2006.

Malta

- AS7201 – Bell 47G-2 on static display at the Malta Aviation Museum in Ta'Qali. It was the first aircraft of the Armed Forces of Malta and was donated to the museum on 31 May 2008.

New Zealand

- NZ3705 – Bell 47G-3B-1 on static display at the Air Force Museum of New Zealand in Wigram, Canterbury.

Norway

- LN-ORW – Bell 47D-1 on static display at the Norwegian Aviation Museum in Bodø, Nordland.

Spain

- HE.7B-31 – AB-47G-3B1 on static display at the Museo Aeronáutico de Málaga in Málaga, Andalusia.

Sweden

- Unknown ID – Bell 47G on static display at the ABBA: The Museum in Stockholm. It had previously been featured on the cover for ABBA's 1976 album Arrival.

Switzerland

- HB-XAE – Bell 47G-2 on static display at the Swiss Museum of Transport in Lucerne.

United Kingdom

- G-AZYB (painted in former SABENA markings as OO-SHW) – Bell 47H on static display at the Helicopter Museum in Weston-super-Mare, Somerset. It supported a scientific expedition in Antarctica.

United States

- N5H – Bell 47B on static display at the American Helicopter Museum & Education Center in West Chester, Pennsylvania.
- N3H – Bell 47 on static display at the Niagara Aerospace Museum in Niagara Falls, New York.
- N116B – Bell 47B on static display at the Steven F. Udvar-Hazy Center of the National Air and Space Museum in Chantilly, Virginia.
- N39KH – Bell 47D on static display at the Hiller Aviation Museum in San Carlos, California.
- LV-AEE – Bell 47B-3 on static display at the Classic Rotors Museum in Ramona, California.
- LV-AEF – Bell 47B-3 on static display at the Niagara Aerospace Museum in Niagara Falls, New York.
- 82 – Bell 47D1 on static display at the Tellus Science Museum in Cartersville, Georgia.
- N996B – Bell 47H-1 on static display at the Niagara Aerospace Museum in Niagara Falls, New York.
- N8010E – Bell 47H on static display at the American Helicopter Museum & Education Center in West Chester, Pennsylvania.
- Unknown ID – On static display at the American Helicopter Museum & Education Center in West Chester, Pennsylvania. It is a Bell 47D-1 that has converted to an H-13 and painted in MASH configuration.
- Unknown ID – Bell 47D-1 on static display at the Museum of Modern Art in New York, New York.
- Unknown ID – Bell 47 on static display at the Lawrence D. Bell Aircraft Museum in Mentone, Indiana.
- Unknown ID – Bell 47 on static, climbable display at the Omaha's Henry Doorly Zoo and Aquarium in Omaha, Nebraska.

== Surviving aircraft ==
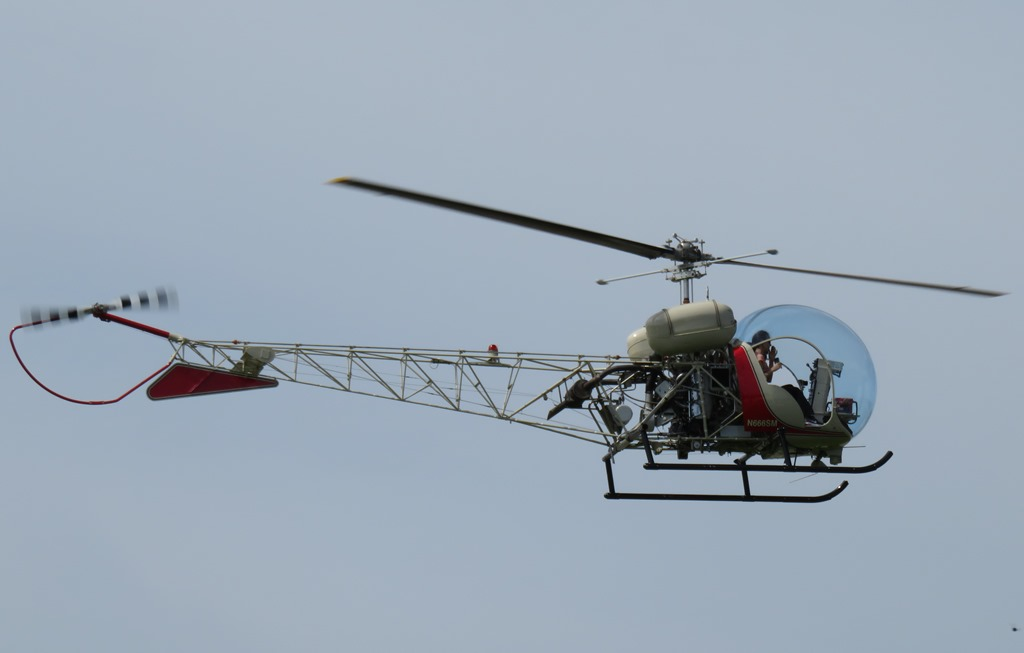
Bell 47 owned by the Experimental Aircraft Association

Austria

- OE-XDM – Bell 47 G-3B-1T (a former United States Army TH-13T) airworthy with The Flying Bulls in Salzburg.

Australia

- A1-402 - Bell 47 G former Australian Army 161 Independent Recce Flight on static display at HARS Parkes Aviation Museum
- VH-ANG - Bell 47 G3b1 currently in flying condition and under private ownership in Far North Queensland.

United States

- N2490B – Bell 47G-2 airworthy at the EAA AirVenture Museum in Oshkosh, Wisconsin.
- N7576 – Bell 47G-2A airworthy at the Classic Rotors Museum in Ramona, California.
- N6356X – Continental Copters Bell 47G airworthy at the Mid America Flight Museum in Mount Pleasant, Texas.

== Specifications (Bell 47G-3B) ==
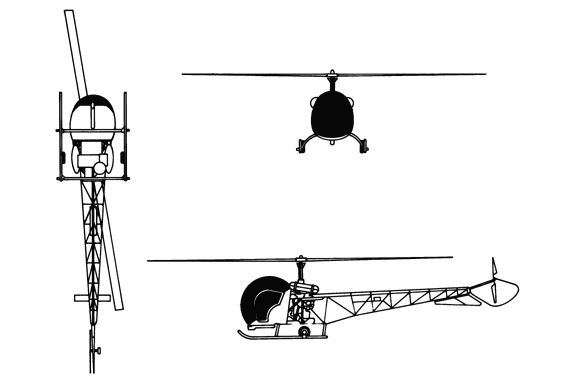
3-view line drawing of the Bell 47

Data from International Directory of Civil Aircraft

General characteristics

- Crew: 1 or 2
- Capacity: 1 passenger or 2 litters (1,057 lb (479 kg) payload)
- Length: 31 ft 7 in (9.63 m)
- Height: 9 ft 3 in (2.82 m)
- Empty weight: 1,893 lb (859 kg)
- Max takeoff weight: 2,950 lb (1,338 kg)
- Powerplant: 1 × Lycoming TVO-435-F1A six-cylinder vertically mounted horizontally-opposed air-cooled piston engine, 280 hp (210 kW)
- Main rotor diameter: 37 ft 2 in (11.33 m)
- Main rotor area: 1,085 sq ft (100.8 m^{2})

Performance

- Maximum speed: 91 kn (105 mph, 169 km/h)
- Cruise speed: 73 kn (84 mph, 135 km/h)
- Range: 214 nmi (246 mi, 396 km)
- Rate of climb: 860 ft/min (4.4 m/s)

== See also ==
Related development

- Agusta A.115
- Bell 47J Ranger
- Bell 201/XH-13F
- Bell 207 Sioux Scout
- Bell H-13 Sioux
- Continental Copters El Tomcat
- Kawasaki KH-4
- Meridionali/Agusta EMA 124

Aircraft of comparable role, configuration, and era

- Canadian Home Rotors Safari
- Hiller OH-23 Raven
- Hughes TH-55 Osage
- Sikorsky S-300
- Enstrom F-28
- Kamov Ka-15

Related lists

- List of military aircraft of the United States
- List of most-produced rotorcraft
