= Bell 207 Sioux Scout =

Experimental attack helicopter in the US

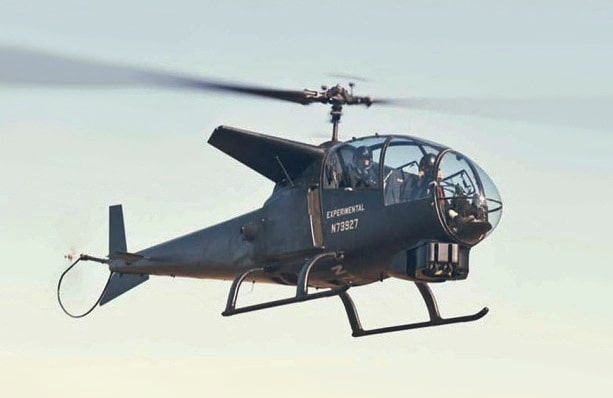
- Bell 207 prototype during flight testing

General information
- Type: Experimental attack helicopter
- National origin: United States
- Manufacturer: Bell Helicopter
- Number built: 1

History
- First flight: 27 June 1963
- Developed from: Bell 47

The Bell 207 Sioux Scout is a modified Bell 47 helicopter, developed by Bell Helicopter under contract from the United States Army, as a proof-of-concept demonstrator for the Bell D-255 helicopter gunship design, featuring a tandem cockpit, stub wings, and a chin-mounted gun turret. The Bell 207 Sioux Scout is named after the Native American Sioux ethnic group.

== Design and development ==
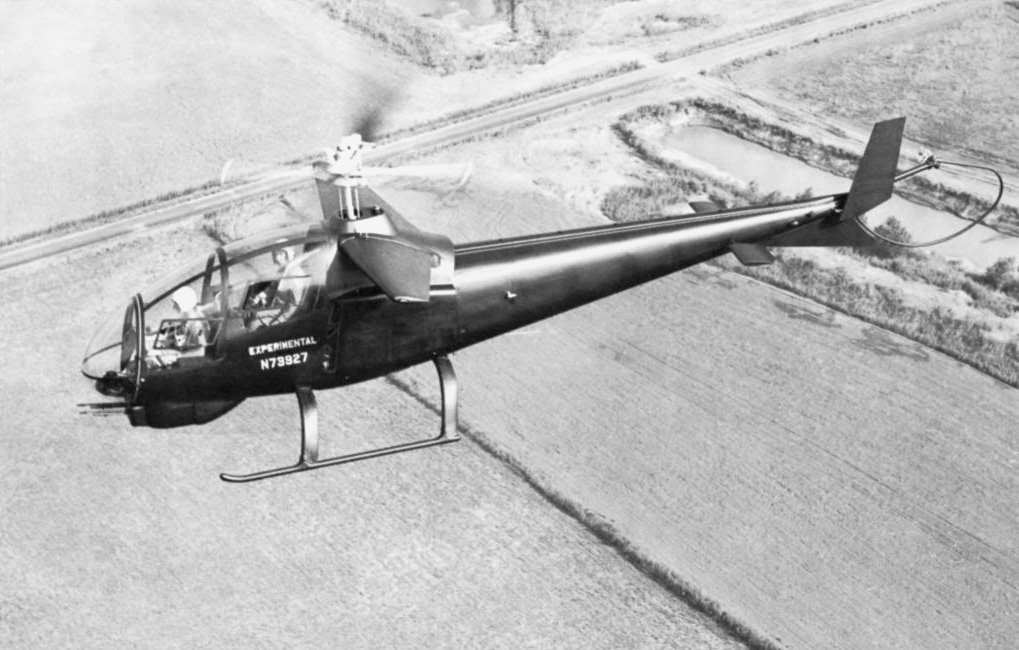
The 207 prototype (N73927) in flight

After several years of development, Bell displayed the mockup of its D-255 "Iroquois Warrior" to Army officials in June 1962, hoping to solicit funding for further development. The D-255 was planned to be a purpose-built attack helicopter based on the UH-1B airframe and dynamic components with a new, slender airframe and a two-seat, tandem cockpit, featuring a grenade launcher in a ball turret on the nose, a 20 mm belly-mounted gun pod, and stub wings for mounting rockets or SS.10 anti-tank missiles.

A proof-of-concept contract was awarded to Bell in December 1962 for the Model 207 Sioux Scout, which was, in essence, a new forward fuselage and Bell 47G-3 dynamic parts fitted to a Bell 47J center and rear fuselage. The Sioux Scout included all the key features of a modern helicopter gunship – a tandem cockpit, stub wings for weapons, and a chin-mounted gun turret. The tandem cockpit placed the gunner in the lower front seat with the pilot in the rear, with both crew positions featuring flight controls. The gunner's position featured a gunsight and turret controls located in the center, so the flying controls were moved to the side of the front cockpit. The gunner controlled a chin-mounted gun turret with twin 7.62 mm (.308 in) M60 machine guns. The stub wings held external fuel tanks.

First flown on 27 June 1963, the Bell 207 demonstrated improved manoeuvrability over the Bell 47/OH-13, derived from the stub wings. A variety of different wings, cowlings and tail surfaces were tested on the 207 before it was turned over to the Army pilots at Fort Benning, Georgia, for further testing at the end of 1963. After evaluating the Sioux Scout in early 1964, the Army was impressed, but also felt the Sioux Scout was undersized, underpowered, and generally not suited for practical use.

Later in 1964, the Army requested proposals for its Advanced Aerial Fire Support System (AAFSS). Bell proposed the D-262, a smaller version of the D-255, making better use of the T53 engine from the UH-1. However, the Bell D-262 was not selected as a finalist in the competition, which was won by the abortive Lockheed AH-56 Cheyenne.

== Specifications ==
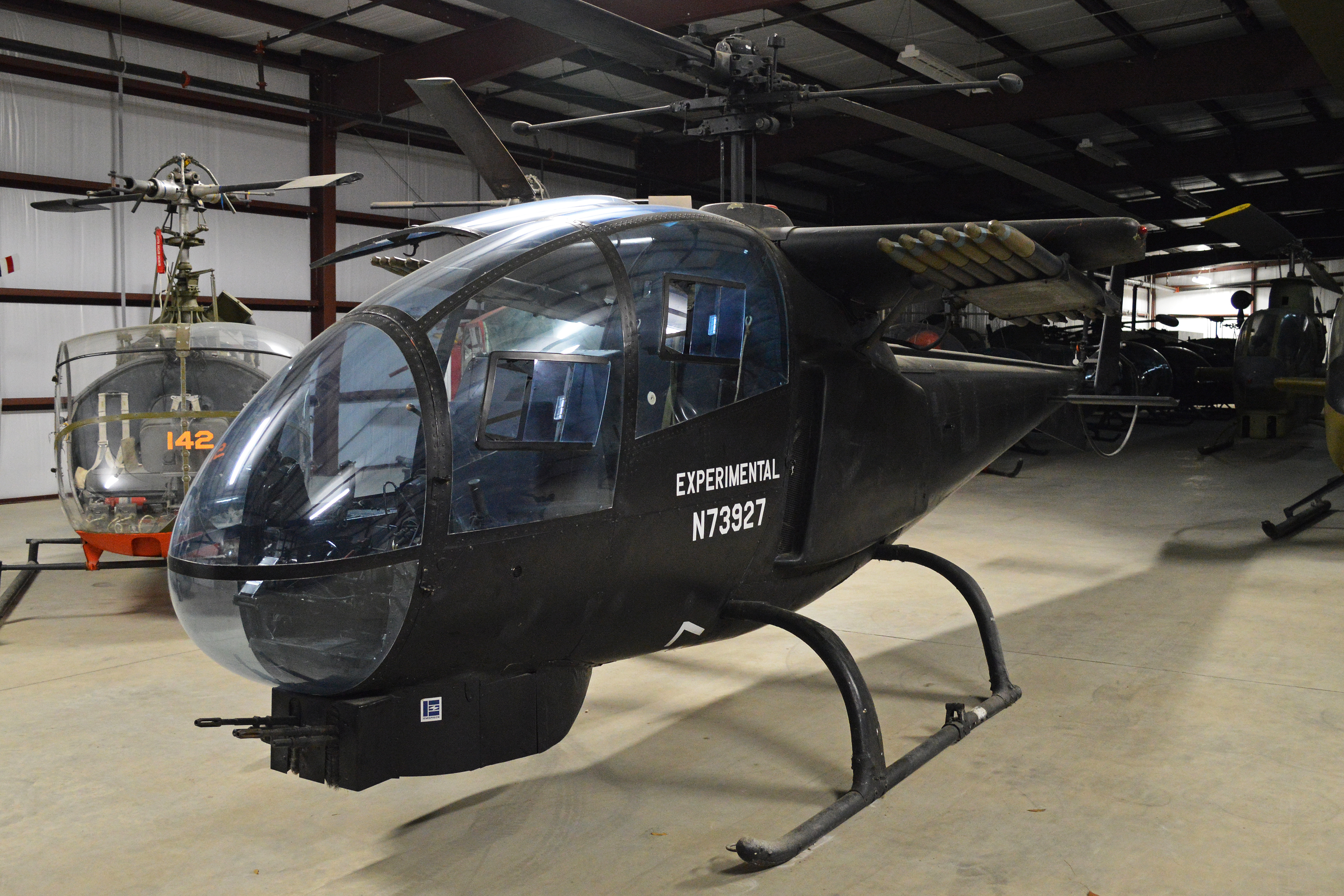
Bell 207 Sioux Scout in the United States Army Aviation Museum

Data from

General characteristics

- Crew: Two in tandem cockpits
- Powerplant: 1 × Lycoming TVO-435-A1A 6-cyl. air-cooled horizontally-opposed piston engine, 260 hp (190 kW)

Performance Armament

- Guns: Two 7.62 mm (.308 in) machine guns in Emerson Electric TAT-101 chin-turret

== See also ==
Related development

- Bell 47
- Bell 47J Ranger
- Bell AH-1 Cobra

Aircraft of comparable role, configuration, and era

- Atlas XH-1 Alpha
- Cicaré CH-14 Aguilucho
- IAR 317 Airfox
- HESA Shahed 285

Related lists

- List of military aircraft of the United States
