= Bell 47J Ranger =

American single-engine single-rotor light helicopter

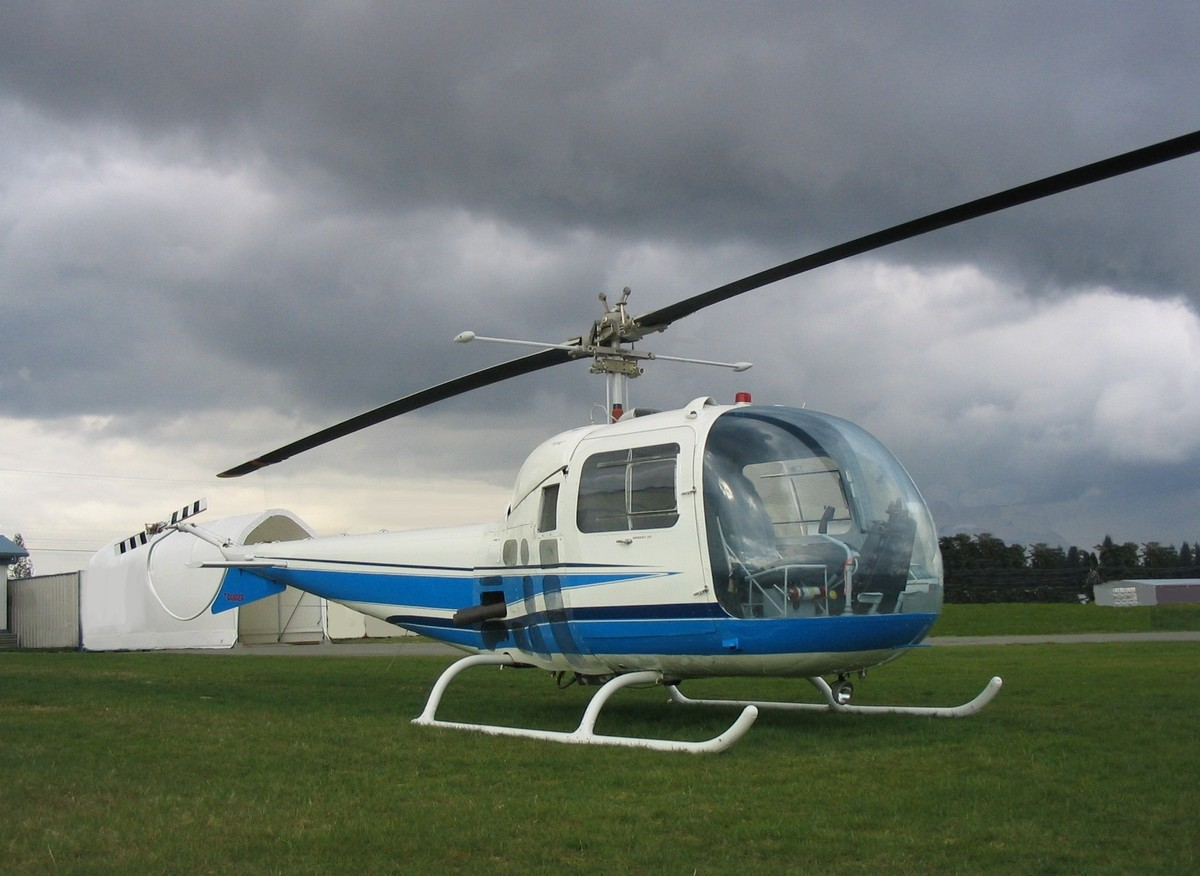
- Bell 47J Ranger

General information
- Type: Utility helicopter
- National origin: United States
- Manufacturer: Bell Helicopter
- Status: Retired
- Number built: 361

History
- Introduction date: 1956
- Retired: July 1967 (UH-13J)
- Developed from: Bell 47
- Developed into: Agusta A.115

The Bell 47J Ranger is an American single-engine single-rotor light helicopter manufactured by Bell Helicopter. It was an executive variant of the highly successful Bell 47 and was the first helicopter to carry a United States president.

== Design and development ==
The 47J was a four-seat variant of the earlier three-seat Bell 47H. The 47H was a deluxe variant of the 47G with a fully clad fuselage and an enclosed cabin. The 47H proved to be too small, so Bell developed the 47J. The 47J was a single pilot aircraft with the pilot seat and controls centered in the front of the cabin, and positioned close to the 180° view unobstructed Lexan "bubble" windscreen. A single bench seat at the rear of the cabin spanned its entire width and allowed for a passenger capacity limited by weight to typically 3 or 4 adults.

== Operational history ==
In March 1957 two Bell 47Js were bought by the United States Air Force as presidential transport and designated H-13J. On 13 July 1957 a H-13J was the first helicopter used by a United States president when it carried Dwight D. Eisenhower from the White House. In March 1962 the two helicopters were moved from presidential duties but were used as VIP transports for the next five years until retired in July 1967.

== Variants ==
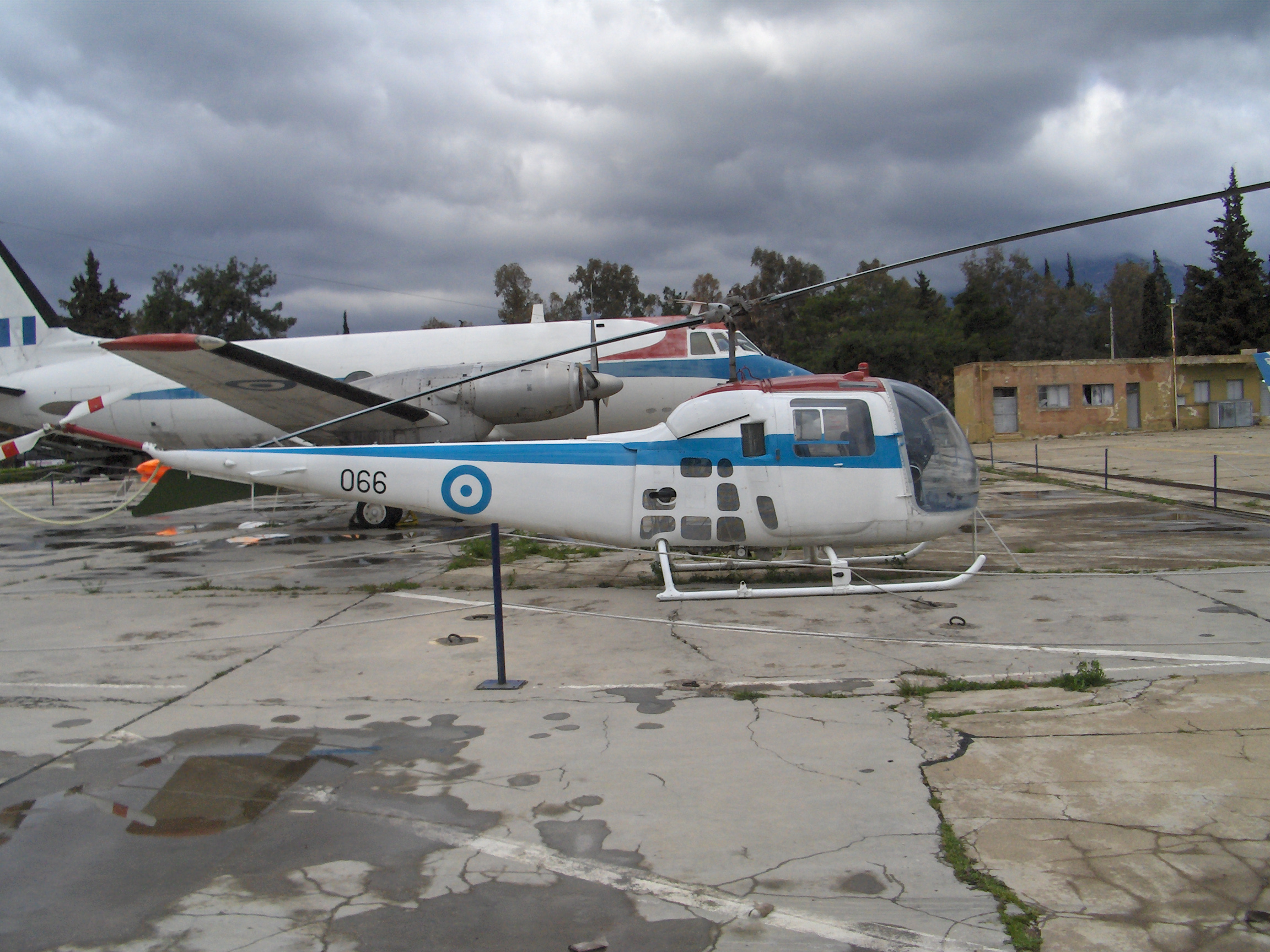
Agusta-Bell 47J Ranger at the Hellenic Air Force Museum at Dekelia (Tatoi), Athens, Greece

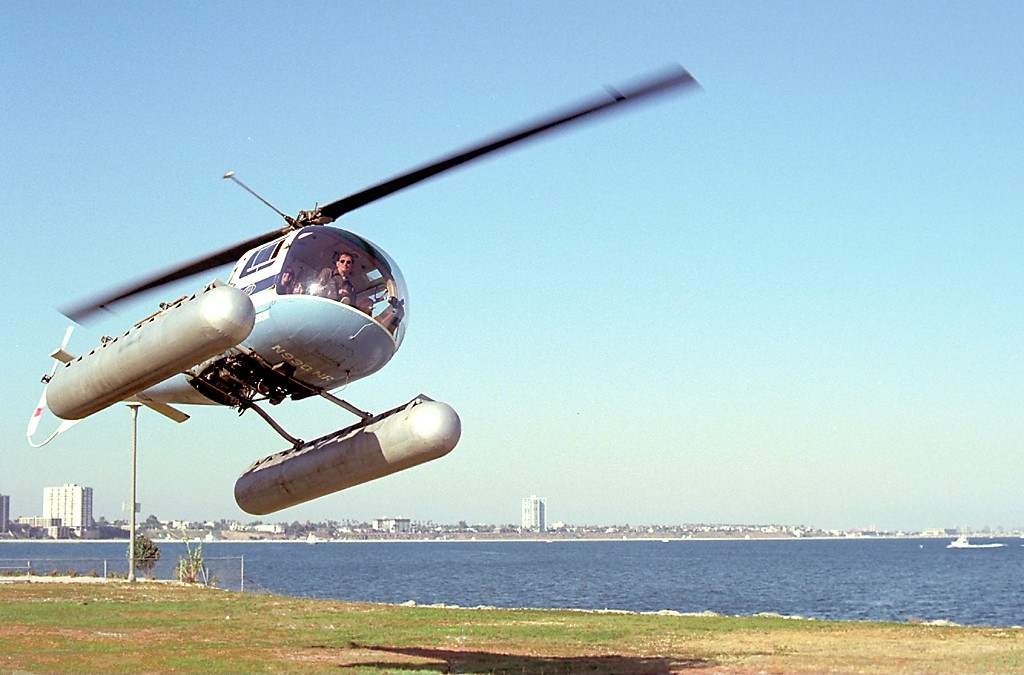
A Bell 47J-2 Ranger, with floats. (California, 1978)

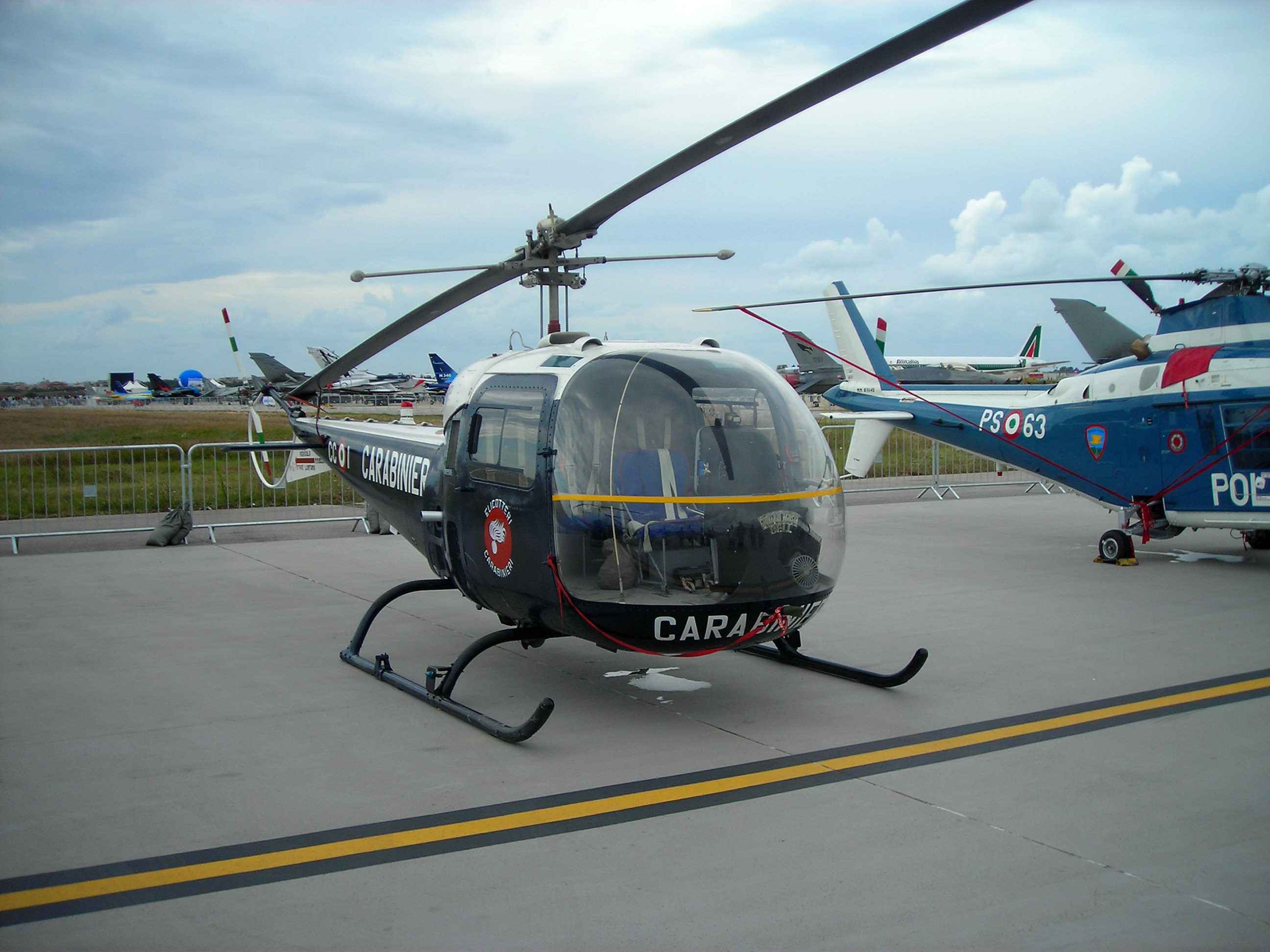
Agusta-Bell AB.47J3 Ranger in Italian Carabinieri markings at Pratica di Mare AFB, Italy in 2006

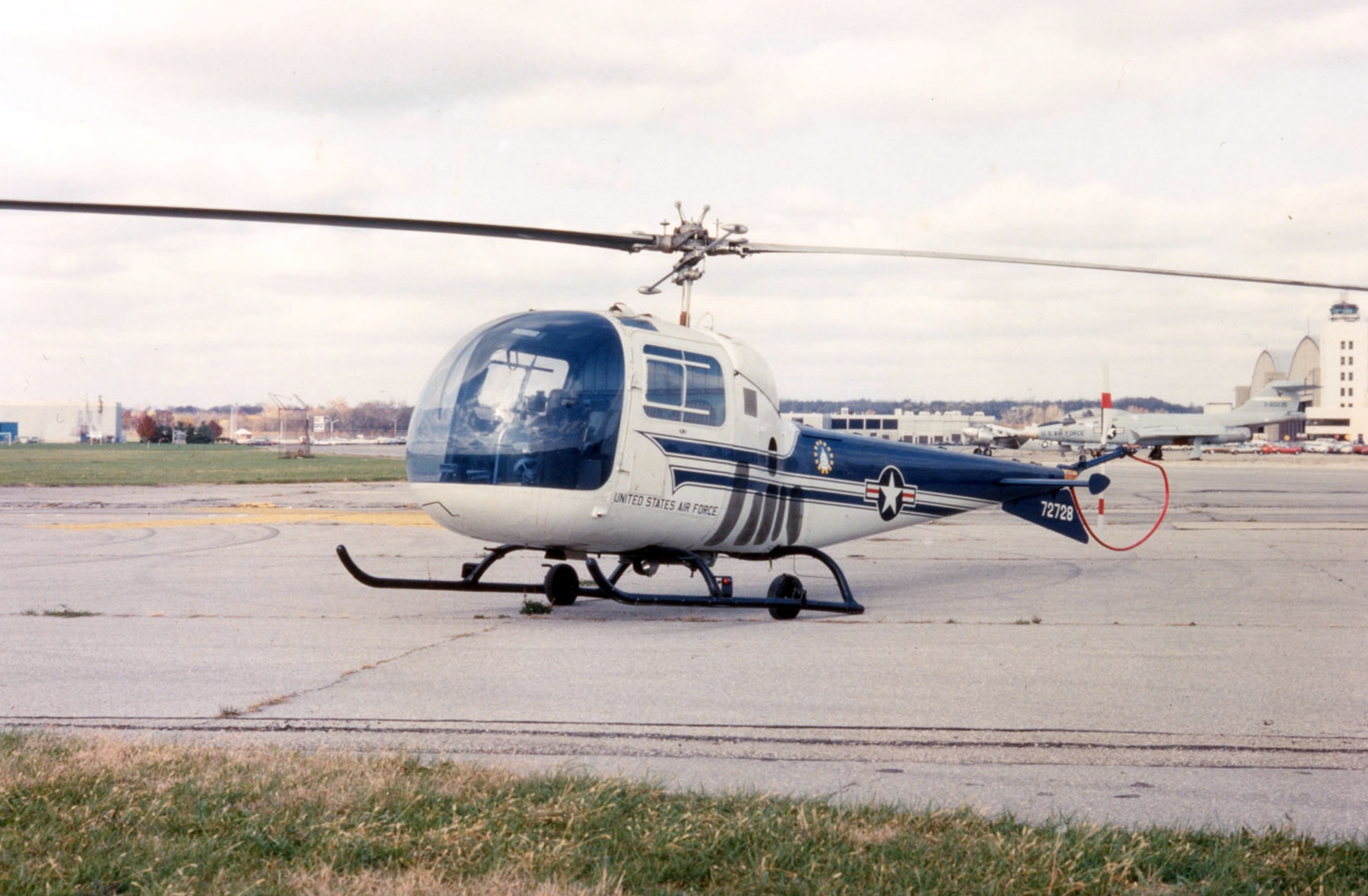
Bell UH-13J Sioux at the National Museum of the United States Air Force

47J Ranger
Production variant powered by a 220hp Lycoming VO-435-A1B engine., 135 built.
47J-1 Ranger
Military VIP variant as the H-13J, two built.
47J-2 Ranger
Production variant with a 240hp Lycoming VO-540-B1B engine, powered controls and metal blades., 104 built.
47J-2A Ranger
Production variant with a 260hp Lycoming VO-540-B1B3 engine and a collective boost system, 75 built.
47J-3
Italian built variant by Agusta-Bell.
47J-3B1
High-altitude variant of the 47J-3
47K
Training variant for the United States Navy, see HTL-7.
HUL-1
United States Navy variant with a 260hp VO-435-B1B, 28 built became UH-13P in 1962.
HUL-1G
Two HUL-1s used by the United States Coast Guard, became UH-13Q in 1962.
HUL-1M
Variant of the HUL-1 with a 250shp YT-62-A-3 turboshaft engine, two built became UH-13R in 1962.
HUL-2
Proposed turboshaft-powered variant, not built.
HTL-7
Model 47K training version of the HUL-1 with a modified two-seat cockpit and a 240hp Lycoming O-435-6 engine, 18 built, later designated TH-13N in 1962.
UH-13J
Two Bell 47J-1 Ranger aircraft utilizing the 179 kW Lycoming VO-435-21 engine acquired for VIP transport of the U.S. President by the U.S. Air Force. Originally designated as H-13J until 1962.
UH-13P
United States Navy variant for use aboard ice-breaking ships, Originally designated as the Navy HUL-1.
TH-13N
The HTL-7 re-designated in 1962.
HH-13Q
The HUL-1G re-designated in 1962.
UH-13R
The HUL-1M re-designated in 1962.
HU-3
Brazilian Navy designation of the 47J.

== Operators ==
Argentina

- Argentine Air Force
- Argentine Coast Guard

Chile

- Chilean Navy

Colombia

- Colombian Air Force

Cuba

- Cuban Air Force

Greece

- Hellenic Air Force

Iceland

- Icelandic Coast Guard

Indonesia

- Indonesian Air Force

Italy

- Italian Air Force
- Italian Army
- Carabinieri
- Italian Navy

Mexico

- Mexican Navy

Spain

- Spanish Air Force

United States

- United States Air Force
- United States Coast Guard
- United States Navy

Venezuela

- Venezuelan Air Force

== Aircraft on display ==
Brazil

- FAB 8510 – Bell 47J on static display at the Museu Aeroespacial in Rio de Janeiro.

Canada

- 1827 – Bell 47J-2 on static display at the Atlantic Canada Aviation Museum in Goffs, Nova Scotia.

Italy

- M.M.80113 – Bell 47J on static display at the Italian Air Force Museum, located on the former Vigna di Valle Air Base in Bracciano near Rome.

Slovenia

- Agusta Bell-47J-2A (reg. YU-HAK) on static display at Slovenian Alpine Museum in Mojstrana, Ljubljana. It was operated by the police aviation unit from 1967 to 1984 and was the first helicopter in Slovenia used for mountain rescue operations.

United States

- 57-2728 – UH-13J on static display at the National Museum of the United States Air Force at Wright-Patterson Air Force Base in Dayton, Ohio.
- 57-2729 – UH-13J on static display at the Steven F. Udvar-Hazy Center of the National Air and Space Museum in Chantilly, Virginia. It was the first helicopter to carry a U.S. president.

== Specifications (Bell 47J-2A) ==
Data from Jane's All The World's Aircraft 1965–66

General characteristics

- Crew: 1
- Capacity: 3 passengers
- Length: 32 ft 5 in (9.87 m)
- Height: 9 ft 3 in (2.83 m)
- Empty weight: 1,833 lb (831 kg)
- Max takeoff weight: 2,950 lb (1,338 kg)
- Fuel capacity: 48 US gal (40 imp gal; 180 L)
- Powerplant: 1 × Lycoming VO-540-B1B vertically mounted air-cooled flat-six, 260 hp (190 kW)
- Main rotor diameter: 37 ft 2 in (11.33 m)
- Main rotor area: 1,085 sq ft (100.8 m^{2})

Performance

- Maximum speed: 105 mph (169 km/h, 91 kn) at sea level
- Cruise speed: 91 mph (146 km/h, 79 kn)
- Range: 258 mi (415 km, 224 nmi) (no reserves)
- Service ceiling: 11,000 ft (3,400 m)
- Rate of climb: 870 ft/min (4.4 m/s)

== See also ==
Related development

- Agusta A.115
- Bell 47
- Bell 201/XH-13F
- Bell 206 JetRanger
- Bell 207 Sioux Scout
- Bell YOH-4

Aircraft of comparable role, configuration, and era

- Aérospatiale Alouette II
- Hiller OH-23 Raven
- TH-55 Osage/Hughes 269
- Hughes/Schweizer 300
- PZL SM-4 Łątka

Related lists

- List of military aircraft of the United States
- List of rotorcraft

== Bibliography ==
- Andrade, John (1979). U.S.Military Aircraft Designations and Serials since 1909. Midland Counties Publications. ISBN 0-904597-22-9.
- Donald, David (1997). The Complete Encyclopedia of World Aircraft. NY, NY: Barnes & Noble. ISBN 0-7607-0592-5.
- Elliott, Bryn (January–February 1999). "On the Beat: The First 60 Years of Britain's Air Police". Air Enthusiast (79): 68–75. ISSN 0143-5450.
- Frawley, Gerard (2003). The International Directory of Civil Aircraft, 2003–2004. Fyshwick, ACT, Australia: Aerospace Publications Pty Ltd. ISBN 1-875671-58-7.
- Taylor, John W. R. (1965). Jane's All The World's Aircraft 1965–66. London: Sampson Low, Marston & Company.
- Wheeler, Barry C. (1 August 1981). "World's Air Forces 1981". Flight International. Vol. 120, no. 3769. pp. 323–384.
- "World Helicopter Market". Flight International. Vol. 94, no. 3096. 11 July 1968. pp. 48–60.
