= Meridionali/Agusta EMA 124 =

EMA 124

General information
- Type: Utility helicopter
- National origin: Italy
- Manufacturer: Elicotteri Meridionali/Agusta
- Number built: 1

History
- First flight: 28 May 1970
- Developed from: Bell 47

The Meridionali/Agusta EMA 124 was a light utility helicopter flown in prototype form in Italy in 1970. The design was undertaken by Agusta for production in a joint venture with Elicotteri Meridionali, based on the Bell 47 that Agusta was building under licence at the time.

The EMA 124 retained the Bell 47's dynamic components, tubular tail, and undercarriage, but was fitted with a new, more aerodynamic forward fuselage with a cabin to seat three. The fuel tank and engine installation were also "cleaned up", and the rotor omitted the stabiliser bars fitted to the Bell 47's rotor.

A single prototype was flown in 1970 (registration I-EMAF), but nothing further came of the project.

== Specifications ==
Data from Stevens 1972, 184

General characteristics

- Crew: One pilot
- Capacity: 2 passengers
- Empty weight: 700 kg (1,540 lb)
- Gross weight: 1,150 kg (2,540 lb)
- Powerplant: 1 × Lycoming VO-540-B1B3 , 186 kW (250 hp)
- Main rotor diameter: 9.50 m (31 ft 2 in)

Performance

- Maximum speed: 170 km/h (110 mph, 96 kn)
- Range: 420 km (260 mi, 230 nmi)
- Service ceiling: 4,300 m (14,100 ft)
- Rate of climb: 4.2 m/s (827 ft/min)
