= Agusta A.115 =

1961 Italian light helicopter prototype

A.115
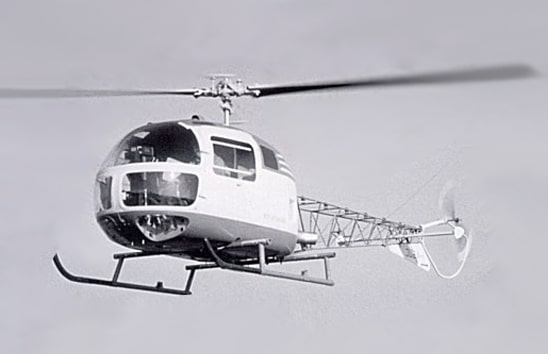

General information
- Type: Light helicopter
- Manufacturer: Agusta
- Status: Cancelled
- Number built: 1

History
- First flight: 1961
- Developed from: Bell 47J Ranger

The Agusta A.115 (registration I-AGUC) was a prototype helicopter flown in 1961 in Italy. It was essentially a Bell 47J-3 with an unclad, tubular tail boom, and powered by a Turbomeca Astazou II turboshaft engine. No production ensued.

== Specifications ==
Data from Jane's All The World's Aircraft 1961–62

General characteristics

- Crew: 1
- Capacity: 3 passengers or three stretchers and medical attendant
- Length: 9.91 m (32 ft 6 in)
- Height: 2.94 m (9 ft 8 in)
- Empty weight: 730 kg (1,609 lb)
- Gross weight: 1,350 kg (2,976 lb)
- Powerplant: 1 × Turbomeca Astazou II turboshaft, 360 kW (480 hp)
- Main rotor diameter: 11.33 m (37 ft 2 in)
- Main rotor area: 101 m^{2} (1,090 sq ft)

Performance

- Maximum speed: 170 km/h (110 mph, 92 kn)
- Cruise speed: 150 km/h (93 mph, 81 kn)
- Range: 260 km (160 mi, 140 nmi)
- Service ceiling: 4,750 m (15,580 ft)

== See also ==
Related development

- Bell 47
- Bell 47J Ranger
