= René Mouille =

French engineer (1924–2019)

René Mouille (30 October 1924 – 10 January 2019) was a French engineer, and designer of many of France's most well-known and important helicopters, widely flown by many air forces around the world.

== Education ==
Mouille studied at the École spéciale des travaux aéronautiques (ESTAé) in Orsay, which closed in 1988; the college has been superseded by the Arts et Métiers ParisTech.

== Career ==
=== Sud Aviation ===
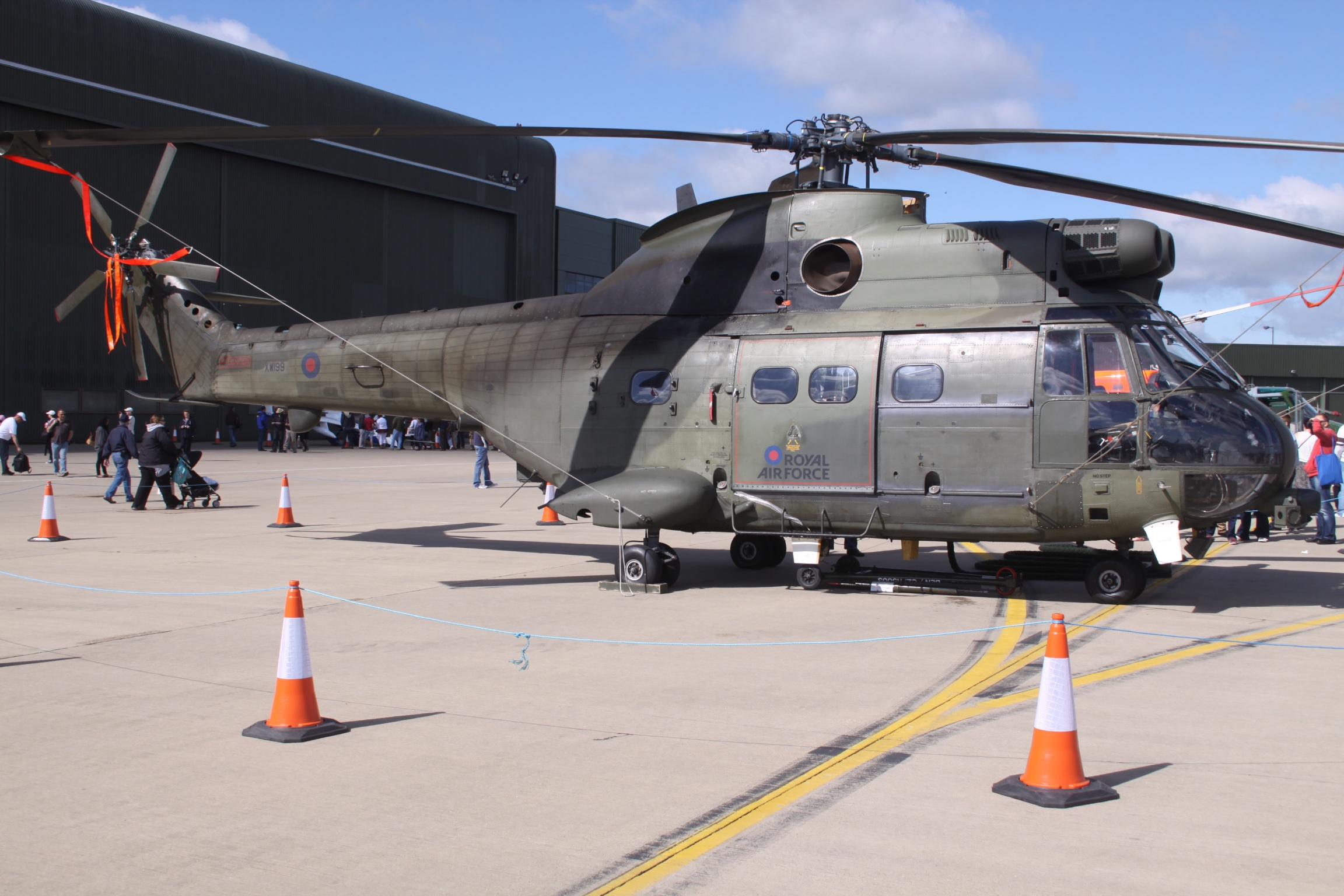
XW199 RAF Puma at RAF Waddington in July 2012; the Puma first flew on 15 April 1965; 44 Pumas fly with the RAF and have recently had new avionics and engines, but will be replaced by the FMH in the early 2020s, which may be the EC725, itself developed from the Puma

He joined SNCASE. The first helicopter that he designed was the SNCASE SE.3110, the first French helicopter, flown by Jacques Lecarme in June 1950.

The SNCASE SE.3120 Alouette first flew in July 1951, flown by Jean Boulet. His next helicopter was the Sud Aviation SE 3130 known as the Aérospatiale Alouette II, working with the engineer Charles Marchetti (1916–1991), and manufactured between 1956 and 1975. The Aérospatiale Alouette III first flew in 1959, of which over 2000 were made.

The SNCASE SE.3200 Frelon first flew in June 1959; The Aérospatiale SA 321 Super Frelon first flew in December 1962, being first made by Sud Aviation.

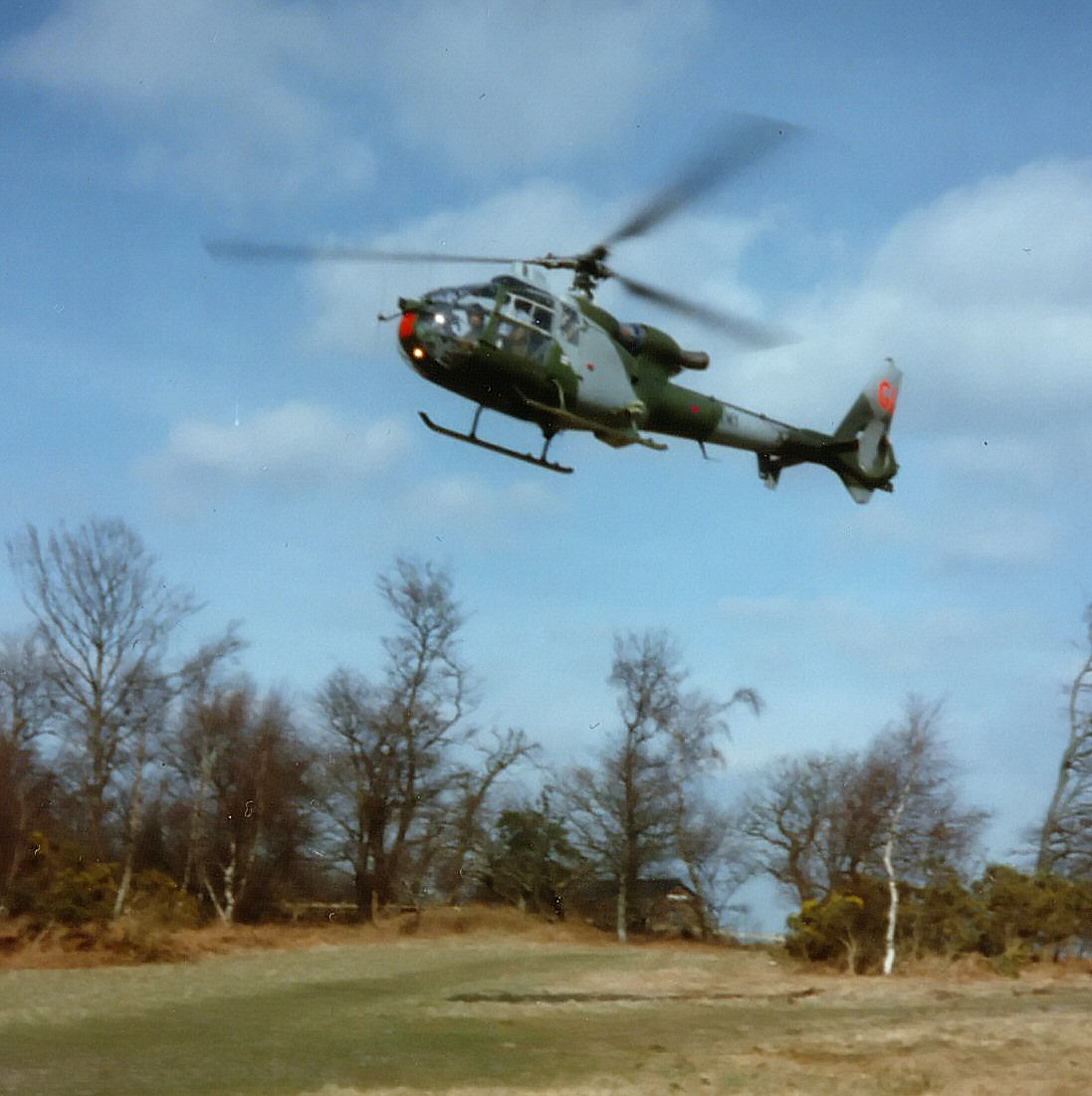
Gazelle with No. 16 Flight AAC in 2006; the Gazelle first flew on 7 April 1967; the AAC's 22 Gazelles were retired in 2012, with the UK flying 119 in its armed forces; the Puma and Gazelle were jointly developed with Westland Helicopters of Somerset

In the later 1960s, he developed the fenestron design for a helicopter's rear tail rotor, with Paul Fabre, the aerodynamicist of Sud Aviation. He invented the Starflex and Spheriflex rotorhead designs. He became chief designer of Sud Aviation helicopter division in 1960.

Sud Aviation had their main helicopter factory at La Courneuve but later moved to Marignane in south-east France, in the Provence-Alpes-Côte d'Azur region. Airbus Helicopters (former Eurocopter Group from 1992 to 2014) has its main factory here.

=== Aérospatiale ===
He was chief designer of the Aérospatiale helicopter division until 1988.

=== Awards ===
The American Helicopter Society (now the Vertical Flight Society) recognized him with all three of its highest honors:

- 1975 Honorary Fellow — granted to Society members whose career-based leadership, vision or other meritorious contribution has advanced significantly the interests of Vertical Flight Society and the vertical flight community. Mouille's citation was: "For the design of the Fenestron fan-in-fin tail rotor system and his continued efforts to improve the technology of our industry."
- 1979 Alexander Klemin Award — given for notable achievement in advancement of vertical flight aeronautics
- 1990 Alexander A. Nikolsky Honorary Lecturer — given to an individual who has a highly distinguished career in vertical flight aircraft research and development and is skilled at communicating their technical knowledge and experience. Mouille's lecture was entitled, "Technological Evolution of French Helicopters."

In December 1977, he won the Bregeut Trophy from the Royal Aero Club.

== See also ==
- Revue Aerospatiale

Business positions
Preceded by Charles Marchetti	Chief Designer of Sud Aviation helicopter division 1960-1970	Succeeded by Company defunct
Preceded by New company	Chief Designer of Aérospatiale helicopter division 1970-1988	Succeeded by
