= Aérospatiale Alouette III =

Light helicopter family by Sud Aviation, later Aerospatiale

SA 316/SA 319 Alouette III
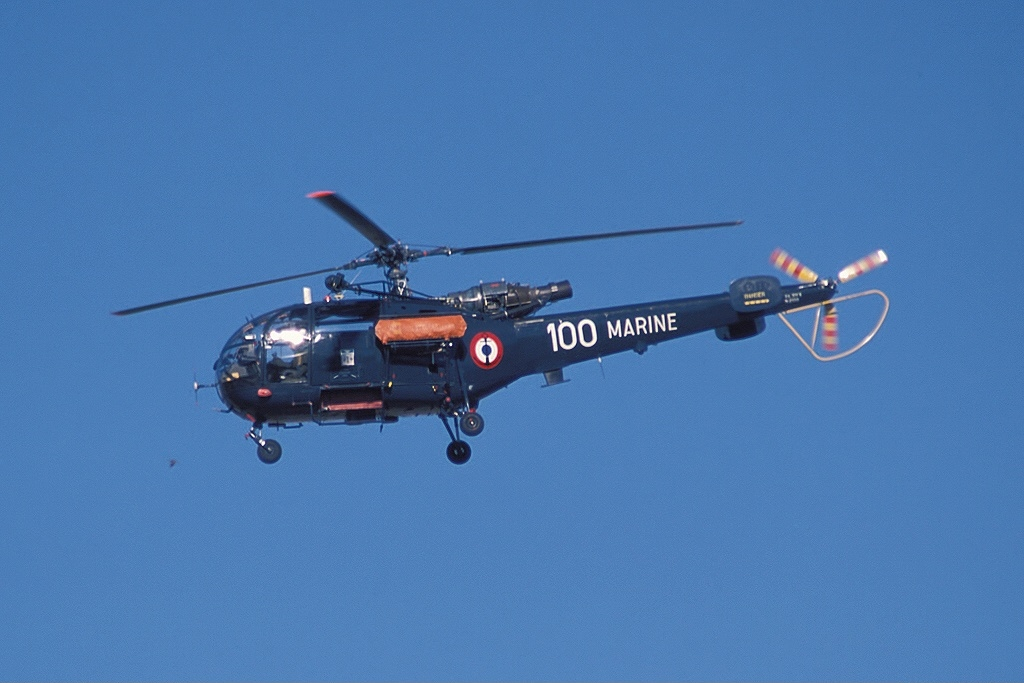
- A French Navy SA 316B Alouette III in 2003

General information
- Type: Light utility helicopter
- National origin: France
- Manufacturer: Sud Aviation; Aérospatiale
- Built by: Hindustan Aeronautics Limited (HAL); Industria Aeronautică Română (IAR)
- Status: In service
- Primary users: French Armed Forces Indian Armed Forces; Portuguese Air Force; Rhodesian Air Force
- Number built: 2,000+

History
- Manufactured: Sud: 1961–1970; Aérospatiale: 1970–1985; HAL:1965–2021; IAR:1971–1987
- Introduction date: 1960
- First flight: 28 February 1959
- Developed from: Aérospatiale Alouette II
- Variant: IAR 316
- Developed into: Aérospatiale Gazelle; Atlas XH-1 Alpha

The Aérospatiale Alouette III (French pronunciation: [alwɛt], Lark; company designations SA 316 and SA 319) is a single-engine, light utility helicopter developed by French aircraft company Sud Aviation. Introduced in the early 1960s, more than 2,000 units were built during its production run that extended for six decades.

The Alouette III was developed as an enlarged derivative of the earlier successful Alouette II. It shared many design elements with its predecessor while offering an extra pair of seats and other refinements. It quickly became a commercial success and was operated by a range of civil and military customers. Further variants were also developed; amongst these was a high-altitude derivative, designated as the SA 315B Lama, which entered operational service during July 1971. The Alouette III was principally manufactured by Aérospatiale, after its take over of Sud Aviation in 1970. The type was also built by various licensed manufacturers such as Hindustan Aeronautics Limited in India (as HAL Chetak), by Industria Aeronautică Română in Romania (as IAR 316), and by Eidgenössisches Flugzeugwerk in Switzerland (as F+W Emmen).

Similar to the Alouette II, in military service, it was used to perform missions such as aerial observation and photography, air-sea rescue, communication liaison, transport, and training. It could also be armed with anti-tank missiles, anti-ship torpedoes, and a fixed cannon. In a civilian capacity, the helicopter was commonly used for casualty evacuation (often fitted with a pair of external stretcher panniers), crop spraying, personnel transportation, and for carrying other external loads.

By the 2010s, many operators were in the process of drawing down their fleets and replacing them with more modern types; the French Armed Forces intended to replace their Alouette IIIs with the newly developed Airbus Helicopters H160 and the Indian Armed Forces with the HAL Dhruvs.

== Development ==
=== Origins ===
The Alouette III has its origins with an earlier helicopter design by French aircraft manufacturer Sud-Est, the SE 3120 Alouette, which, while breaking several helicopter speed and distance records in July 1953, was deemed to have been too complex to be realistic commercial product. Having received financial backing from the French government, which had taken an official interest in the venture, the earlier design was used as a starting point for a new rotorcraft that would harness the newly developed turboshaft engine; only a few years prior, Joseph Szydlowski, the founder of Turbomeca, had successfully managed to develop the Artouste, a 260 hp (190 kW) single shaft turbine engine derived from his Orédon turbine engine. An improved version of this engine was combined with the revised design to quickly produce a new helicopter, initially known as the SE 3130 Alouette II.

During April 1956, the first production Alouette II was completed, becoming the first production turbine-powered helicopter in the world. The innovative light helicopter soon broke several world records and became a commercial success. As a result of the huge demand for the Alouette II, manufacturer Sud Aviation took a great interest in the development of derivatives, as well as the more general ambition of embarking on further advancement in the field of rotorcraft.

In accordance with these goals, the company decided to commit itself to a new development programme with the aim of developing a more powerful helicopter that would be capable of accommodating up to 7 seats or a pair of stretchers. The design team was managed by French aerospace engineer René Mouille. The design produced, designated as the "SE 3160", featured several improvements over the Alouette II; efforts were made to provide for a higher level of external visibility for the pilot as well as for greater aerodynamic efficiency via the adoption of a highly streamlined exterior.

=== Into flight and production ===
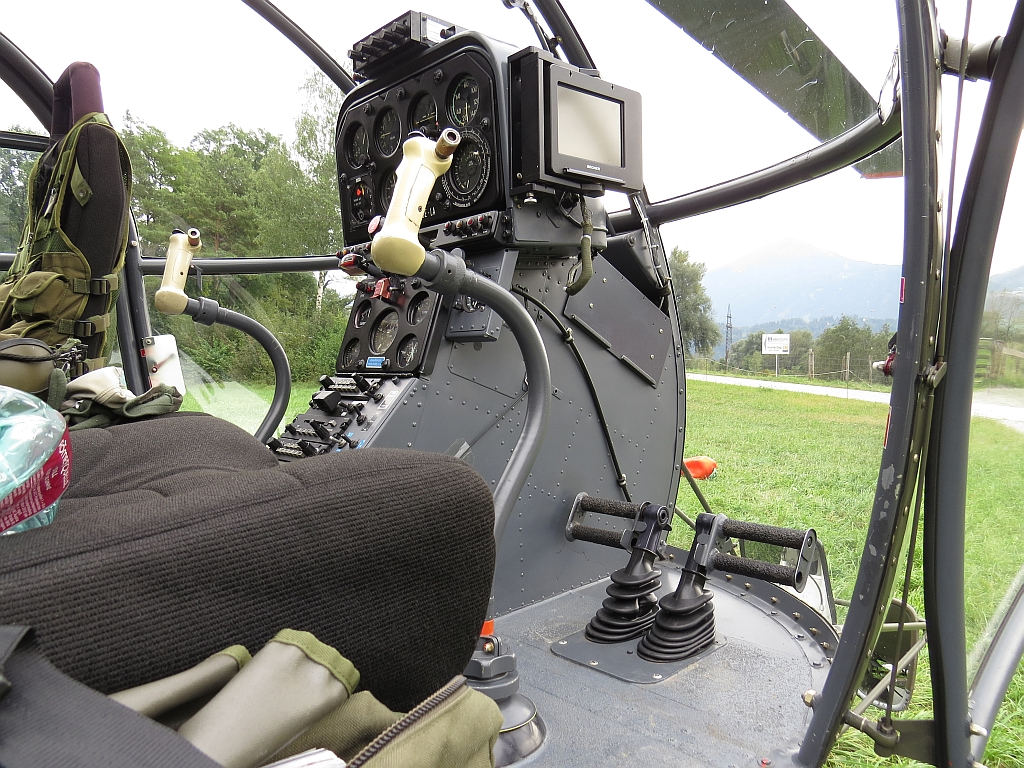
Cockpit and flying controls of an Alouette III

On 28 February 1959, the first prototype SE 3160 performed its maiden flight, piloted by French aviator Jean Boulet. Shortly thereafter, the SE 3160 would become more commonly known as the Alouette III. During its flight test programme, the prototype demonstrated its high altitude capabilities on several occasions; in June 1959, it landed at an altitude of over 4,000 metres in the Mont Blanc mountain range and, during October 1960, it was able to achieve the same feat at an altitude more than 6,000 metres in the Himalayas. During these attempts, it was flown by Jean Boulet, who was accompanied by a pair of passengers and 250 kg of equipment.

During 1961, the initial SE 3160 model of the type entered serial production. On 15 December 1961, the Alouette III received its airworthiness certificate, clearing it to enter operational service. Despite an order placed by the French Army for an initial batch of 50 Alouette IIIs during June 1961, the first two customers of the rotorcraft were in fact export sales, having been sold outside of France. The Alouette III was specifically designed to fly at high altitudes, as such, it quickly earned a reputation for its favourable characteristics during rescue operations. According to its manufacturer, it was the first helicopter to present an effective multi-mission capability and performance to match with its diverse mission range in both civil or military circles.

The SE 3160 model continued to be produced until 1968, when it was replaced by the refined "SA 316B" model. (After its production ended, the SE 3160 has sometimes been retroactively redesignated "SA 316A", but its original SE 3160 designation is more commonly used, especially in older sources.) Both the SE 3160 and the SA 316B were powered by a more powerful version of the Artouste engine, the Artouste IIIB, whose turbine was rated to produce 858 horsepower (640 kW), though because of the limits of the engine's reduction gearbox, the Artouste IIIB was de-rated to generate 563 horsepower (420 kW) in service. The later "SA 319B" variant adopted the more fuel-efficient Turbomeca Astazou XIVB engine, extending its range and endurance; on 10 July 1967, the Astazou-powered Alouette III performed its first flight. During 1979, the 1,437th Alouette III departed from the company's assembly line in Marignane, France, after which the main production line was closed down as a consequence of diminishing demand for the type. During 1985, the final French-produced Alouette III was delivered. It had been produced from 1961 to 1985 in France, however, license production continued.

==== Overseas production ====
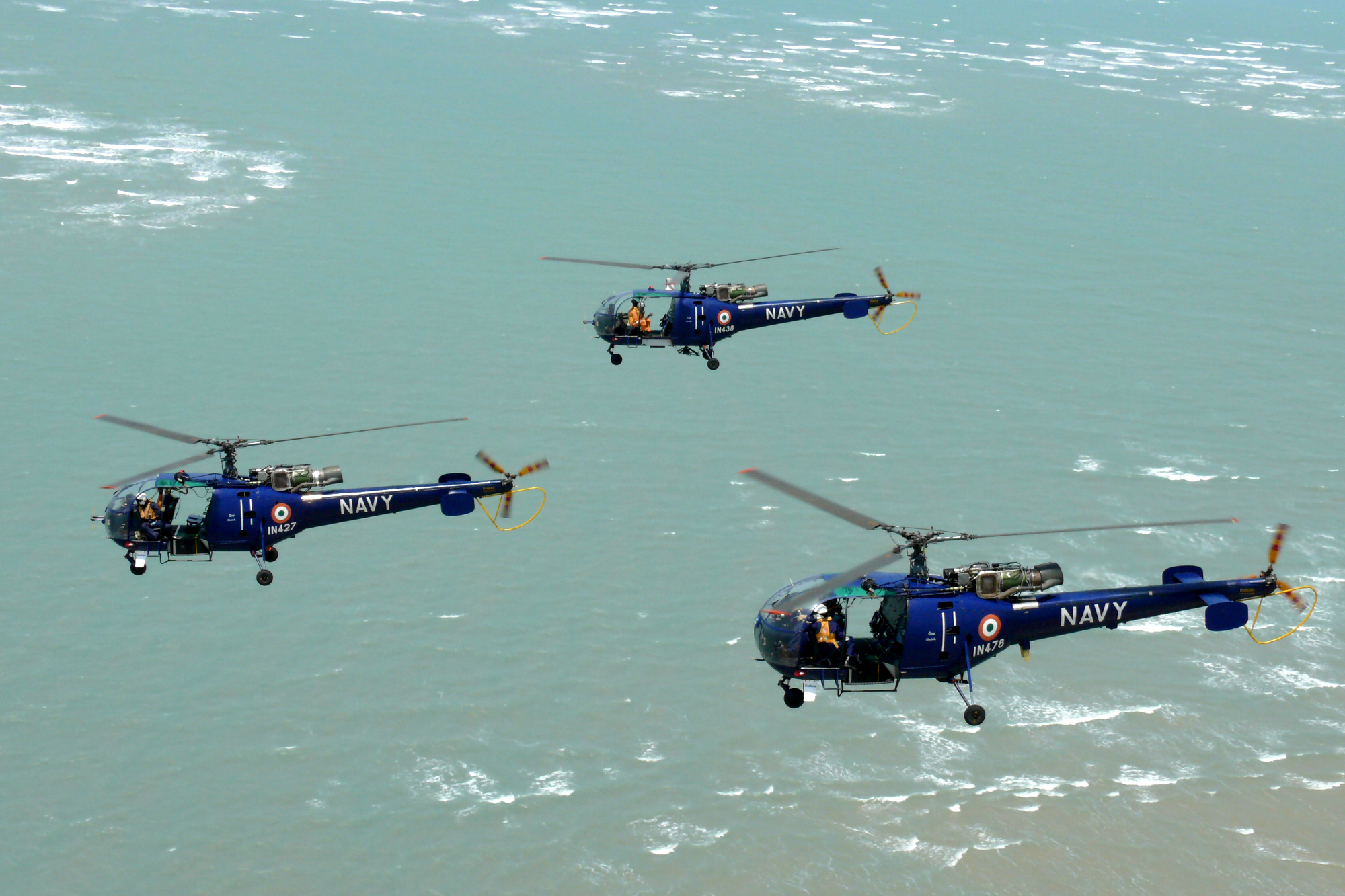
The HAL Chetak (Alouette III) remained in production to 2021, and in 2022 marked six decades of service in India

Despite the closure of Aérospatiale 's own production line, the event was not the end of the type's manufacturing activity. Over 500 Alouette IIIs are recorded as having been manufactured under licence abroad in several countries, such as Romania, India, and Switzerland. Various versions of the Alouette III were also either licence-built or otherwise assembled by IAR in Romania (as the IAR 316), F+W Emmen (de) in Switzerland, by Fokker and Lichtwerk in the Netherlands, and in India as the HAL Chetak. The Romanian IAR 316, was an Aérospatiale SA 316B Alouette III license produced from 1971 to 1987, with 250 made with about half for Romania and half for export. Additionally, Romania also developed the IAR 317 Airfox, an attack helicopter version of the IAR 316;at least one prototype was made and was debuted at the 1985 Paris Air Show.

Hindustan Aeronautics Limited (HAL) obtained a licence to construct the Alouette III, which was known locally as the Chetak, at their own production facilities in India. More than 300 units were built by HAL; the company has continued to independently update and indigenise the helicopter over the decades. A modernised variant of the Chetak has remained in production, though at a diminished volume, into the 21st century. The latest HAL Chetak was delivered in 2021, and also included updated avionics. Over 350 Chetak had been produced the 2020s.

== Operational history ==
=== Argentina ===
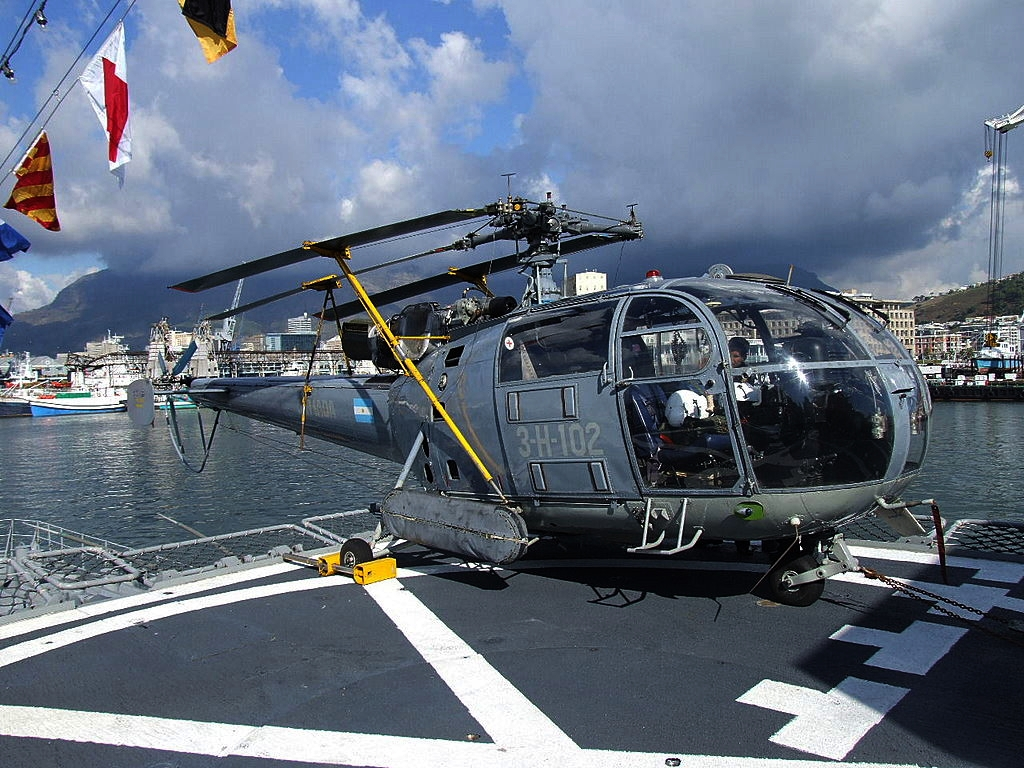
Argentine Navy Alouette III onboard corvette ARA Rosales

The Argentine Naval Aviation operated a total of 14 Alouette III helicopters. A single SA316B was on board the ARA General Belgrano when she was sunk by torpedoes fired by HMS Conqueror during the 1982 Falklands War with the United Kingdom. A second Alouette III played an important role during the Argentine Invasion of South Georgia. On 2 December 2010, the last example was retired at a ceremony held at BAN Comandante Espora, Bahía Blanca.

=== Australia ===
Between April 1964 and 1967, a small batch of Alouette IIIs were delivered from France in a disassembled state to Australia. Following their assembly, these were used by the Royal Australian Air Force (RAAF) at the Woomera Rocket Range for light passenger transport purpose and to assist in the recovery of missile parts in the aftermath of test launches conducted at the Range.

=== Austria ===
Between 1967 and 1969 Austria acquired 12 SE3160 Alouette IIIs, which were upgraded to version SE316B. They are used for liaison and transport purposes and still play a vital role in rescue missions in the high mountains of Austria with their side-mounted hook. They are stationed in Aigen im Ennstal, Klagenfurt and Schwaz in Tirol. Austria planned to decommission them beginning in 2023, and they were to be replaced by the Leonardo AW169M. In addition to the original order, three more used Alouette III were acquired from other forces to replace attrition.

=== Bangladesh ===
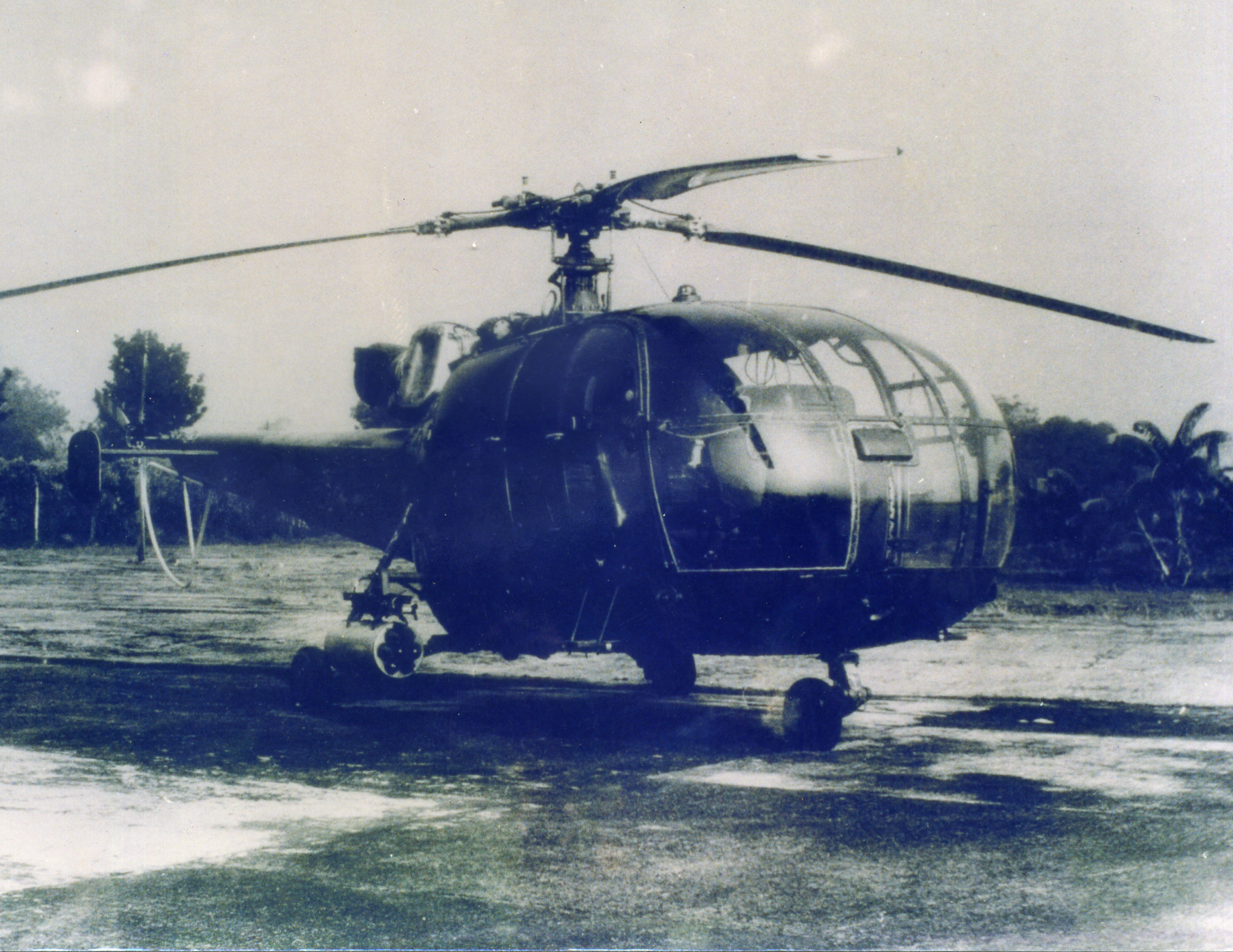
Alouette III was the first helicopter of the Bangladesh Air Force, during the Bangladesh Liberation War (1971)

Indian civilian authorities and the Indian Air Force donated a DC-3 Dakota, a Twin Otter, and a Alouette III helicopter to the Bangladesh Air Force, during the Bangladesh Liberation War in 1971. The aircraft were engaged to take advantage of the lack of night-fighting capability of the Pakistan Air Force, and to launch hit-and-run attacks on sensitive targets inside East Pakistan. The Alouette helicopter was extensively modified with a 1 in (25 mm) steel plate welded to its floor for extra protection, and fitted with 14 rockets from pylons attached to its side and .303 Browning machine guns. The helicopter was operated by a three member crew consisting of Squadron Leader Sultan Mahmood, Flight Lieutenant Bodiul Alam, and Captain Shahabuddin, all of whom were awarded he Bir Uttam gallantry award.

=== Chile ===
During 1977, the Chilean Navy ordered a batch of ten SA-319Bs. These rotorcraft, which were delivered by the middle of 1978, were only made operational just before the peak of the Beagle conflict between Chile and neighbouring Argentina. The Alouette III was the first real organic maritime ship borne tactical helicopter to be operated by Chile's naval forces; for this role, they were equipped with a radar and armed with rockets, guns, depth charges and a single light anti-submarine torpedo.

During the frantic training period in 1978 to meet wartime needs, a sole SA-319B was accidentally damaged, leading to it being placed in storage and subsequently repaired back to an airworthy condition years later. All ten Chilean Navy SA-319Bs were operational and in excellent conditions by the end of the 1980s, shortly after which they were replaced by larger SA532 Super Puma helicopters, and were bought by civilian operators.

=== Denmark ===
Between 1962 and 1967, a total of 8 Alouette IIIs were delivered to the Royal Danish Navy. They were primarily tasked with SAR and reconnaissance in support of the navy's Arctic patrol ships. During 1982, they were replaced by a batch of British Westland Lynx.

=== France ===
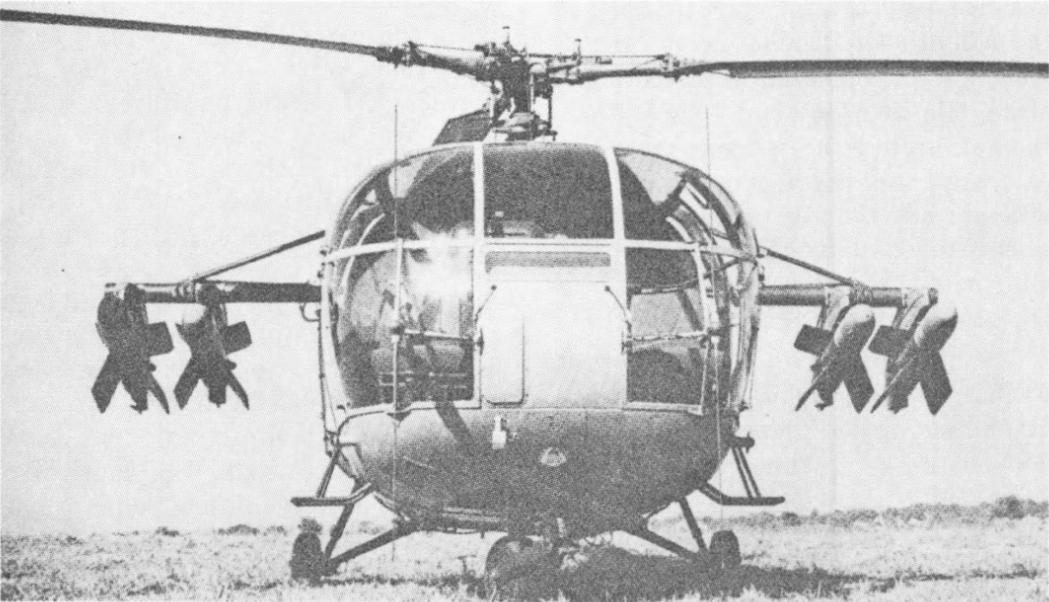
Alouette III with Nord AS.11 missiles

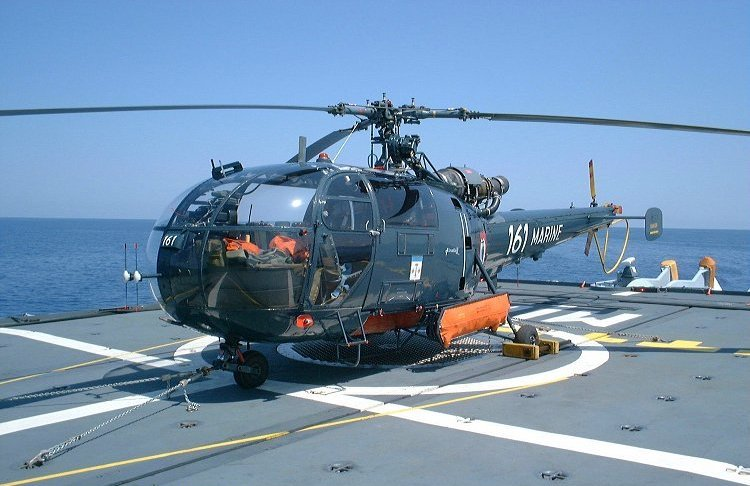
French Navy SA 319B Alouette III (with Astazou engine) on the frigate La Motte-Picquet

During early 1960, the Alouette III officially entered squadron service with the French armed forces. In June 1971, having been suitably impressed by the type's performance so far, the French Army elected to order a force of 50 Alouette IIIs for their own purposes. Amongst the most noteworthy uses that France applied the type to was the first use of helicopter-based anti-tank missiles in the form of the Nord AS.11 MCLOS wire-guided missile.

During June 1960, an Alouette III carrying seven people successfully performed both take-offs and landings on Mont Blanc in the French Alps at an altitude of 4,810 metres (15,780 feet), an unprecedented altitude for such activities by a helicopter at the time. The same helicopter again demonstrated the type's extraordinary performance in November 1960 by making take-offs and landings with a crew of two and a payload of 250 kg (551 lbs) in the Himalayas at an altitude of 6,004 metres (19,698 feet).

During June 2004, the Alouette III was retired from the French Air Force after 32 years of successful service, having been entirely replaced by the newer twin-engined Eurocopter EC 355 Ecureuil 2. The French Army also withdrew the last of their examples during 2013 in favour of more modern rotorcraft such as the Airbus Helicopters H160.

By 2017, the French Navy were still using the Alouette III in a reduced capacity, nonetheless being used to routinely conduct both search and rescue and logistics missions. Since the 1970s, the type has gradually been supplanted by the larger Eurocopter AS365 Dauphin, and later on, by the specialised Eurocopter AS565 Panther as an anti-submarine warfare platform. The use of twin-engined rotorcraft in the maritime environment has become somewhat of an expected standard, one which the single-engined Alouette III cannot satisfy, putting the type at an obvious disadvantage. During January 2018, it was announced that the French Navy would be replacing its remaining Alouette IIIs with rented Aérospatiale SA 330 Pumas as a stop-gap measure; this decision was reportedly taken due to its increasing unreliability, rapidly inflating operating costs, and the sheer age of the fleet. However, as of 2021 the Alouette III was still reported to be in service. The aircraft was finally withdrawn from French Navy service in June 2022. It had been in service for 60 years and was in active use right to the end, with the last three ending their service at the end of December. The aircraft was long known for ease of maintenance, which aided its use overseas, however and the end of its life it was requiring increasing maintenance hours and it was becoming hard to get spare parts which were no longer in production. The aircraft was still be used for training, interdiction missions, and shorter range mission.

=== Ireland ===
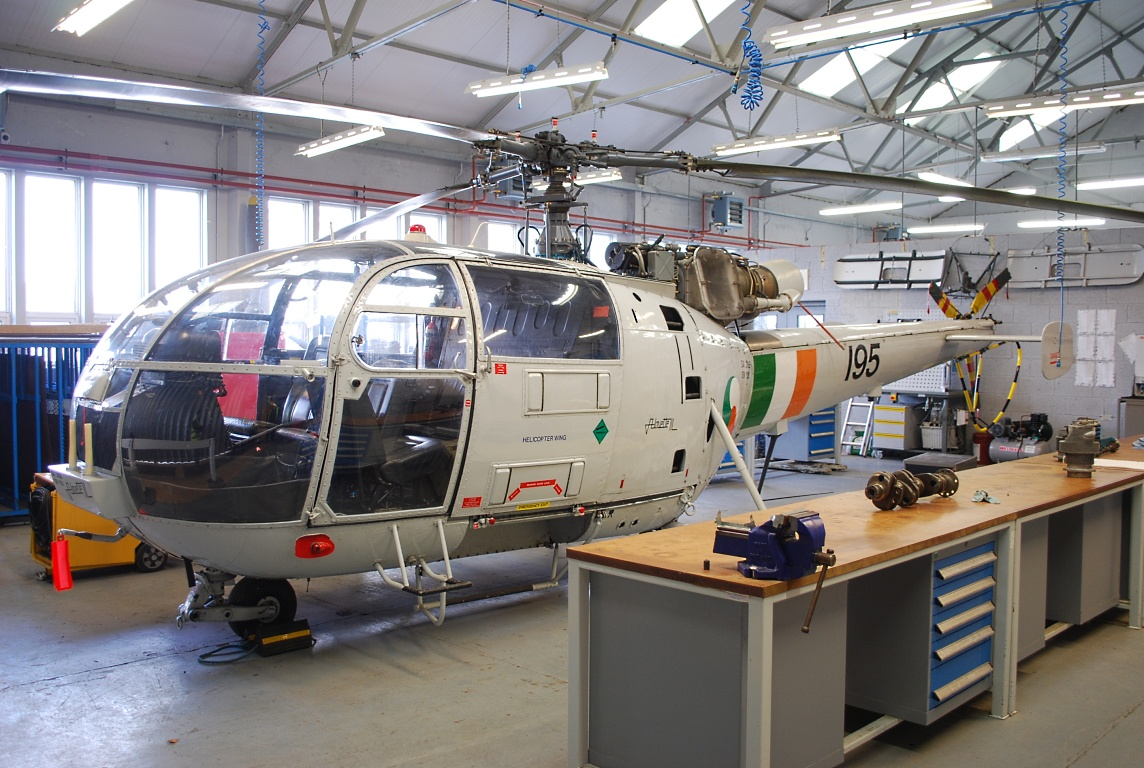
An Irish Air Corps SA 316B Alouette III, 2011

During 1963, the first pair of Alouette IIIs were delivered to the Irish Air Corps; a third rotorcraft arrived in 1964 and a batch of five further aircraft were delivered between 1972 and 1974. The service ultimately operated a total of eight Alouette IIIs between 1963 and 2007; throughout much of this period, they were the only helicopters operated by the Corps.

On 21 September 2007, the Alouette III was formally retired from the Irish Air Corps during a ceremony held at Baldonnel Aerodrome. During 44 years of successful service, the Irish Alouette III fleet amassed over 77,000 flying hours. As well as routine military missions, the aircraft undertook some 1,717 search-and-rescue missions, saving 542 lives and flew a further 2,882 air ambulance flights. The oldest of the Alouettes, 195, is kept in 'rotors running' condition for the Air Corps Museum.

=== India ===
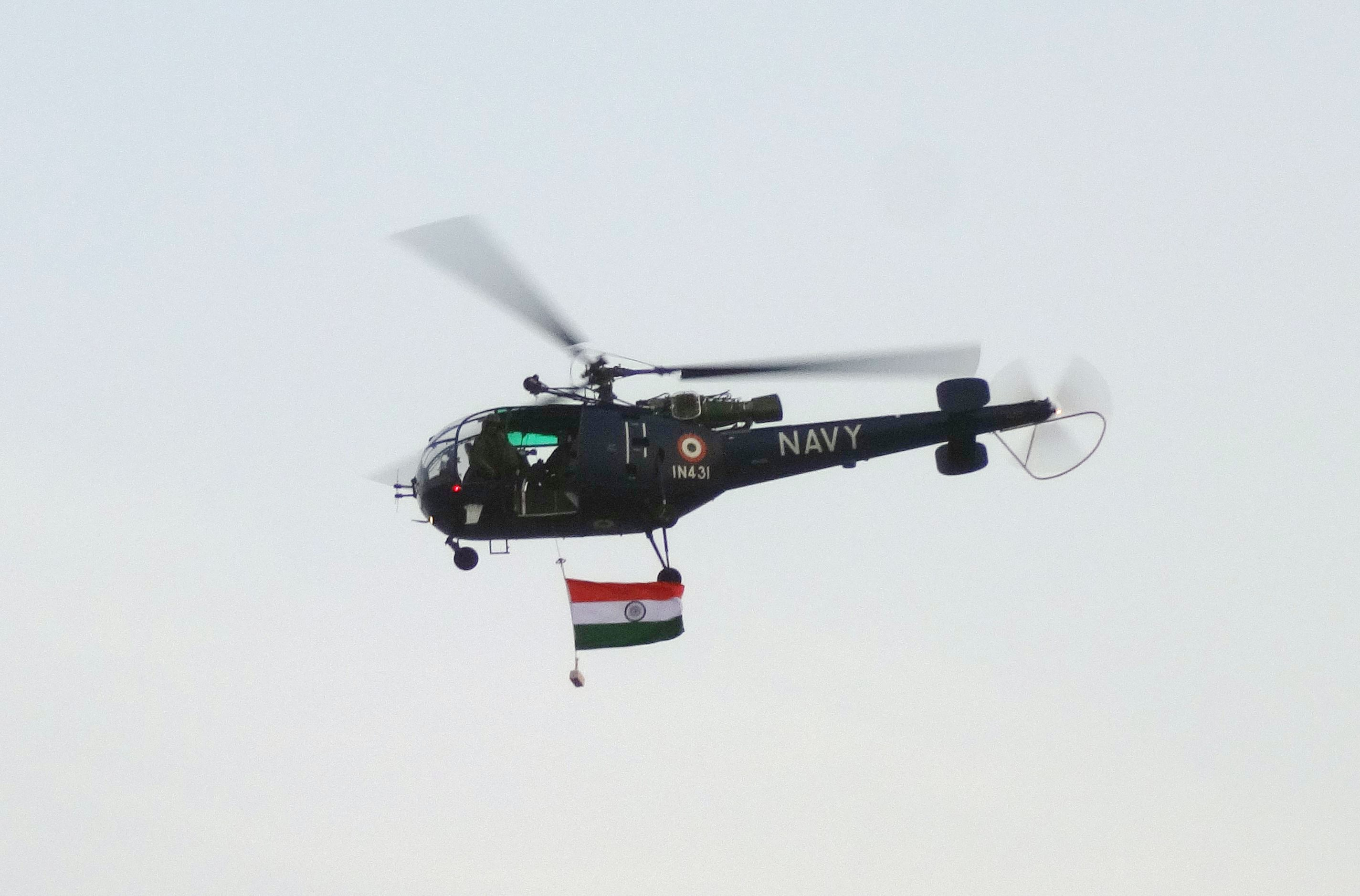
Chetak of the Indian Navy in 2016

Under a licensing arrangement between Aérospatiale and HAL, the Alouette III was built by HAL and was known as HAL Chetak. HAL manufactured more than 350 of these, the majority of these were acquired by the Indian Armed Forces. The helicopters were used to perform various mission roles, including training, transport, casualty evacuation, communications and liaison roles. After the Government of India constituted the Indian Army Aviation Corps in 1986, majority of the Chetaks previously operated by the Indian Air Force were transferred to the Indian Army on 1 November 1986. The Air Force continued to fly a limited number of armed Chetaks for evacuation and attack missions. The Chetaks were widely used in India's armed conflicts and multinational operations such as Operation Khukri in 2000.

During the 2010s, the Chetak was replaced by the HAL Dhruv in the armed forces, and the Chetaks were widely used for training, and light utility roles. In 2013, HAL unveiled a new variant, named as HAL Chetan, which included an upgraded HAL/Turbomecca TM 333-2M2 Shakti engine. In 2017, the Indian Navy initiated plans for procuring a replacement for the type. However, an additional contract for eight helicopters were signed in 2017, the last of which was delivered in 2021.

In the 1970s, Chetak helicopters were decorated with animal motifs and presented at the annual Republic day parades. The helicopters decorated like elephants have become iconic in India, and known as names such as "dancing elephant helicopters" and "flying elephants".

HAL also exported the Chetak helicopters to nations such as Namibia and Suriname. India also donated helicopters to other countries such as Bangladesh and Nepal.

=== Indonesia ===
The Indonesian Army Aviation received seven Alouette III in 1969, replacing their Mil Mi-4 which were grounded due to lack of spare parts. Their first combat operations was mopping up the Sarawak communist insurgents in Riam Sejawak, West Kalimantan Province. The Indonesian Army sent three Alouette III to participate in the Indonesian invasion of East Timor in 1975 and its subsequent counter-guerilla operations, performing combat search-and-rescue and reconnaissance roles. In 2003, the Indonesian Army still has a single operational Alouette III.

=== Netherlands ===
During the early 1960s the Alouette III replaced the Hiller OH-23 Raven of the Netherlands Armed Forces. Later it also replaced the Alouette IIs of the Royal Netherlands Air Force. A total of 77 Alouette IIIs were ordered in batches over the years, with 27 being built in license by NV Lichtwerk in Hoogeveen. The Alouette III served for 51 years in the Netherlands Armed Force before being retired in 2016.

=== Pakistan ===
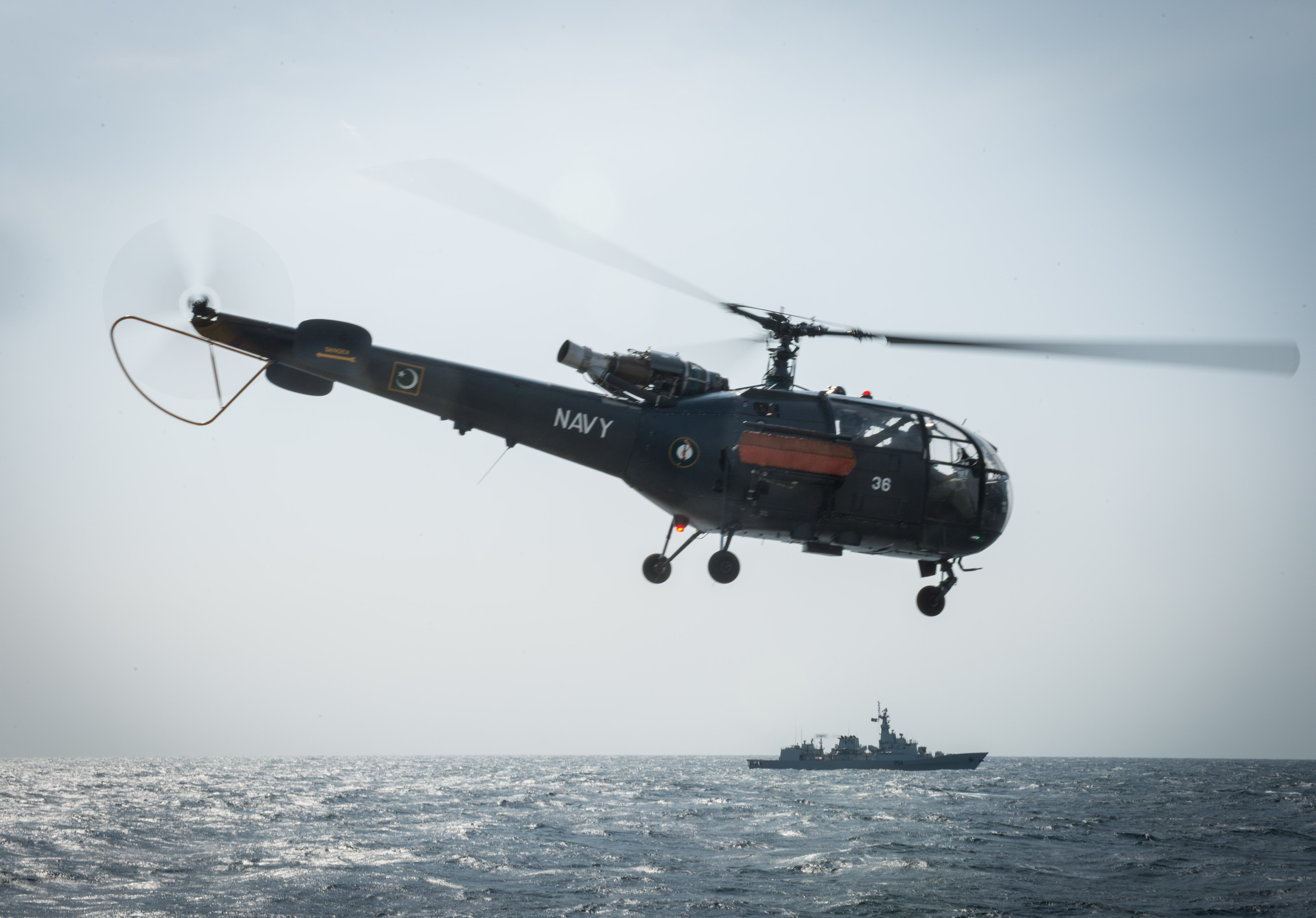
A Pakistan Navy Alouette III in 2014

During the 1960s, Pakistan purchased a fleet of 35 Alouette III helicopters to equip the Pakistan Air Force (PAF). These saw active combat during the Indo-Pakistani War of 1971, in which the type was mainly used for liaison and VIP-transport missions. In 2010, it was announced that Switzerland had come to an agreement with Pakistan for a number of ex-Swiss Alouette IIIs to be donated to the PAF; however, the terms of this agreement restricts their usage to performing search and rescue and disaster relief operations. Pakistan Navy started operating Alouette III helicopters in 1977. The helicopters are still in service and have a long history of flying laurels.

=== Portugal ===
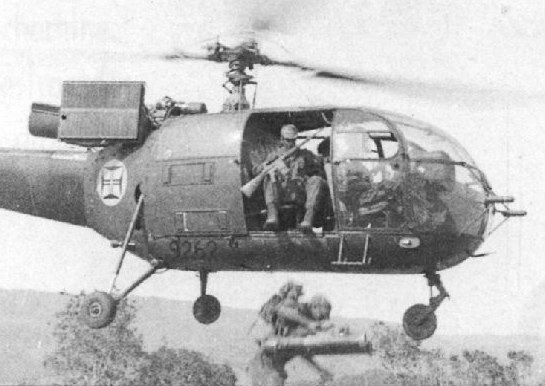
Portuguese paratroopers jump from an Alouette III in an air assault operation in Angola in the early 1960s.

Portugal was the first country to use the Alouette III in combat. In 1963, during the Overseas Wars in Angola, Mozambique and Portuguese Guinea, Portugal began using Alouette IIIs in combat, mainly in air assault and medevac operations, where it proved its qualities. Besides the basic transport version (code named canibal, plural canibais), Portugal used a special version of the Alouette III with a MG 151 20 mm autocannon mounted in the rear in order to fire from the left side door; it was designated helicanhão (heli-cannon) and code named lobo mau (big bad wolf).

In the Overseas Wars, the Portuguese usually launched air assaults with groups of six or seven Alouette III: five or six canibais – each usually carrying five paratroopers or commandos – and a lobo mau heli-cannon. The Portuguese practice was for the troops to jump from the canibais when the helicopters were hovering two-three metres above the ground – famous images of these disembarking troops became an iconic image of the war. The landing of the troops was covered by the lobo mau. While the troops performed the ground assault, the canibais moved away from the combat zone, while the lobo mau stayed to provide fire support, destroying enemy resistance and concentration points with the fire from its 20 mm autocannon. Once the ground combat had finished, the canibais returned; firstly to collect the wounded, then the rest of the troops.

In April 2020, the last of Portugal's SE3160 Alouette IIIs were withdrawn from service, the type having been replaced by five AgustaWestland AW119 Koala.

=== Republic of Korea ===
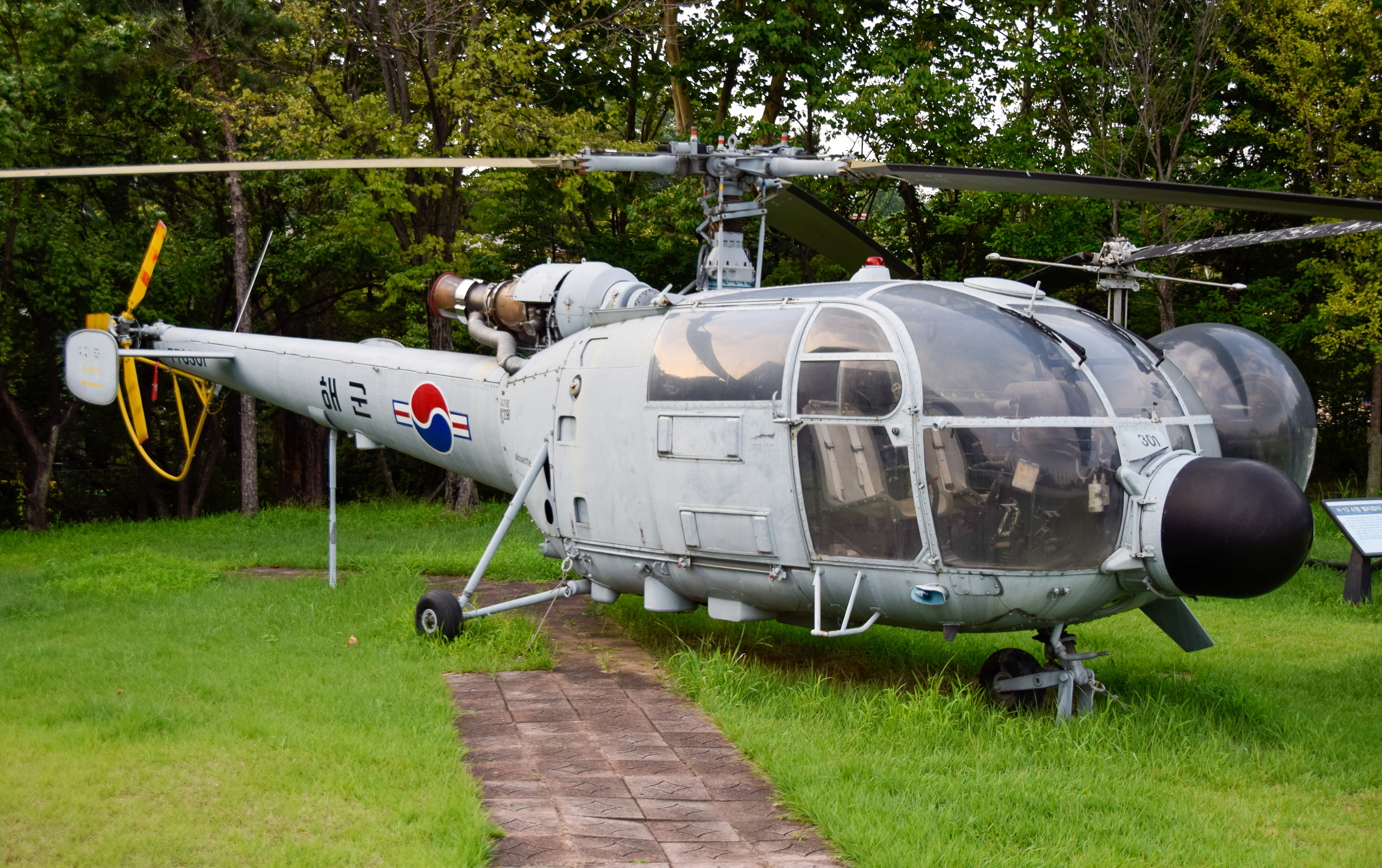
South Korean Aérospatiale SA 319B Alouette III

In 1977, the Republic of Korea Navy started operating 12 Alouette IIIs. It was typically dispatched aboard several destroyers in an anti-submarine capacity. On 13 August 1983, the Republic of Korea Navy discovered a naval vessel of the Korean People's Army that had entering their sea. A single Alouette III engaged the spy ship and destroyed it using an AS.12 missile; following the mission, the specific helicopter involved received a victory marking, which was the only aircraft to receive such a mark in the entire Republic of Korea Armed Forces. The Alouette III was also operated as a rescue helicopter, responding to major incidents such as the crash of Asiana Airlines Flight 733 in Mokpo, Republic of Korea, on 26 July 1993.

Following the introduction of the Westland Lynx during the early 1990s, the Alouette IIIs were diverted to secondary roles, such as training, and were gradually phased out of service. A substantial number were withdrawn in 2006. South Korea's remaining Alouette IIIs were withdrawn from service in December 2019.

=== Rhodesia ===
The nation of Rhodesia emerged as a prolific user of both the Alouette II and its enlarged sibling, the Alouette III. Early operations were flown with an emphasis on its use by the Rhodesian Army and British South Africa Police, including paramilitary and aerial reconnaissance operations. Throughout the 1960s, the type progressively spread into additional roles, including aerial supply, casualty evacuation, communications relays, and troop-transports. Rhodesian aerial operations would typically involve flying under relatively high and hot conditions, which reduced the efficiency of aircraft in general; however, the Alouette II proved to be both hardy and relatively resistant to battle damage. In order to extend the inadequate range of the type, fuel caches were strategically deployed across the country to be used for refuelling purposes.

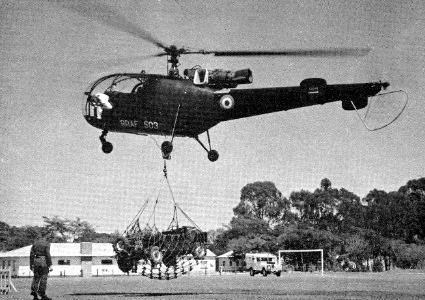
A Rhodesian SE 3160 Alouette III hovering with an underslung cargo, August 1962

At its peak, No. 7 Squadron of the Rhodesian Air Force operated a force of 34 Alouette IIIs, which would normally operate in conjunction with a smaller number of Alouette IIs. They played a major part in the Rhodesian Forces' Fireforce doctrine, in which they would rapidly deploy ground troops, function as aerial observation and command posts, and provide mobile fire support as armed gunships. In order to improve performance, Rhodesia's Alouette fleet was subject to extensive modifications during its service life, including changes to their refueling apparatus, gun sights, and cabin fittings, along with the installation of additional armouring and armaments.

Over time, the Rhodesian Security Forces developed an innovative deployment tactic of rapidly encircling and enveloping enemies, known as the Fireforce, for which the Alouette II was a core component. The quick-reaction Fireforce battalions were typically centred at Centenary and Mount Darwin; however, a deliberate emphasis was placed on locating both rotorcraft and troops as close to a current or anticipated theatre of operations as would be feasibly possible.

=== South Africa ===
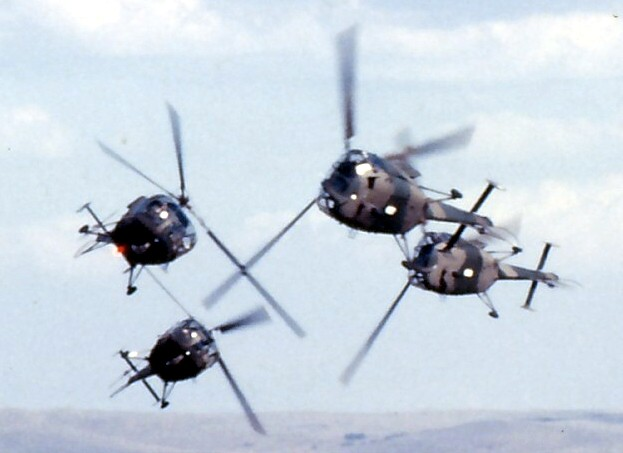
A flight of four Alouette IIIs performing an aerobatic display

The Alouette III served for over 44 years in the South African Air Force (SAAF); it is believed that 121 examples were acquired between 1962 and 1975 for the service from France. During 1966, by which point the SAAF had built up a fleet of around 50 Alouette IIIs already, it was decided to dispatch several of the type to support ground troops stationed in South West Africa attempting to contain the emerging South West African People's Organisation (SWAPO); this would be the beginnings of what would become the lengthy South African Border War. The type saw considerable action during the conflict; while initially used for more passive operations such as aerial reconnaissance, from July 1967 onwards, Alouette III participated in active combat missions as well. It was frequently employed as a support platform for performing South African counterstrike operations inside neighbouring Namibia and Angola. Reportedly, a total of eight Alouette IIIs had been listed as having been lost over the conflict zone by the end of the war.

By 1990, there were a total of 70 Alouette III helicopters remaining in active service. Throughout the course of its service life with the SAAF, the Alouette III fleet was recorded as having accumulated more than 346,000 flight hours. During June 2006, the last Alouette III was officially withdrawn from SAAF service at a ceremony held at AFB Swartkop, near Pretoria.

During January 2013, reports emerged that South African defense officials were in the process of planning to transfer some of the retired fleet, along with spare parts and associated support equipment, to the Zimbabwean Air Force; South African newspaper Mail & Guardian claimed that the rotorcraft could be used to sway politics in the nation in favour of the incumbent President, Robert Mugabe. However, during February 2013, an interim court order was issued which blocked the proposed sale of South African Alouette IIIs to Zimbabwe. In February 2014, reports emerged that South Africa now intended to sell part of the ex-SAAF fleet to Namibia instead.

=== Suriname ===
During 1986, the South American country of Suriname purchased a pair of secondhand Alouette III helicopters from Portugal. During 1999, the Surinam Air Force opted to retire and sell off its Alouette III helicopters. In their place, three newly built HAL Chetaks (an Indian version of the Alouette IIIs) were delivered to the Suriname Air Force on 13 March 2015, while the pilots and technicians of the Surinam Air Force underwent training on the type in Bangalore, India for some time.

=== Switzerland ===
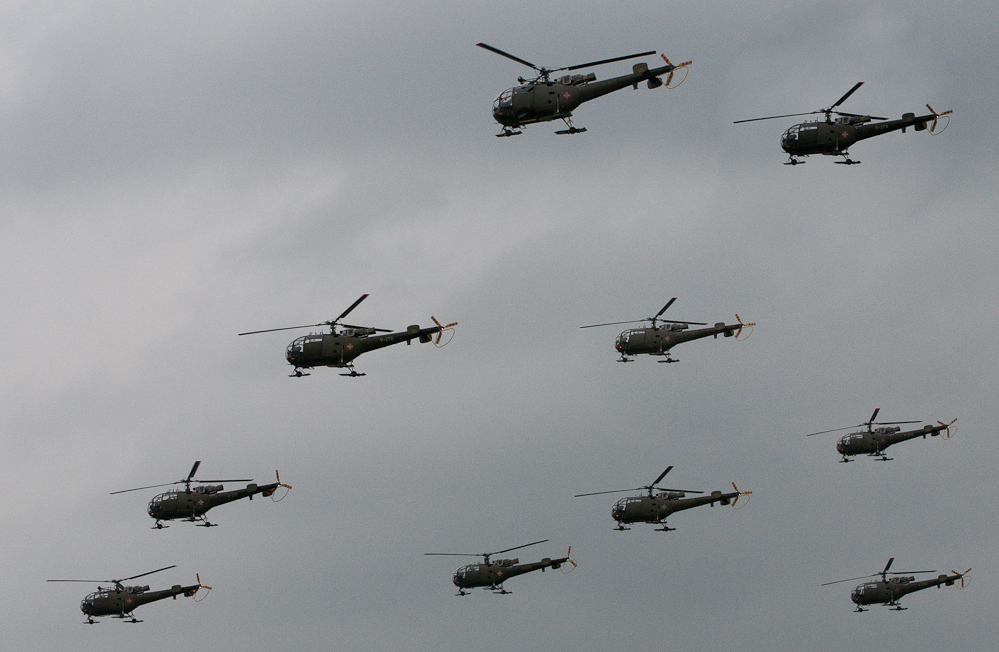
Formation flight of 10 Alouette IIIs, 2010

During 1964, the Swiss Air Force opted to procure a batch of nine Alouette III rotorcraft directly from Aérospatiale; further orders included one placed in 1966 for 15 more. In addition, a total of 60 SA-316Bs (often referred to as the F+W Alouette IIIS) were licence-assembled by F+W Emmen in Switzerland.

During 2004, the Swiss Armed Forces announced the expected withdrawal of the Alouette III from front-line service would commence by 2006 and that it was to be entirely retired by 2010; they have been replaced by a smaller force of 20 new-built Eurocopter EC635s. Since their retirement, at least 10 ex-Swiss Alouettes have been gifted to Pakistan to perform search and rescue operations.

== Variants ==
- SE 3160 : the first production version. Sometimes retroactively redesignated SA 3160 or SA 316A. Maximum weight of 2,100 kg (4,630 lb); powered by Turbomeca Artouste IIIB or IIIB1 turboshaft engine rated at 420 kW (563 hp) for takeoff (440 kW (590 hp) for IIIB1) and 405 kW (543 hp) continuous, but restricted by rotor transmission limitations to 405 kW (543 hp) for takeoff and 331 kW (444 hp) continuous.
- SA 316B : like SE 3160, but with strengthened main and tail rotor for greater performance; maximum weight of 2,200 kg (4,850 lb), and rotor transmission limit on takeoff power increased to 440 kW (590 hp). The SA 316B was built under licence in India as the HAL Chetak, and again under licence in Romania as the IAR 316.
  - HAL Chetak : Indian production version of the SA 316B.
  - HAL Chetan : HAL/Turbomecca TM 333-2M2 Shakti engine.
  - IAR 316 : Romanian production version of the SA 316B.
  - F+W Alouette IIIS : 60 SA-316B licence-assembled in Switzerland by F+W Emmen (de) between 1970 and 1974.
- SA 319B (sometimes called "Alouette III Astazou") : developed from the SA 316B. Maximum weight of 2,250 kg (4,960 lb); powered by a Turbomeca Astazou XIVB turboshaft engine rated at 440 kW (590 hp) for takeoff and 405 kW (543 hp) continuous, but rotor transmission limitations restricted continuous power to 368 kW (493 hp).
- SA 316C : developed from the SA 316B. Maximum weight of 2,250 kg (4,960 lb); powered by a Turbomeca Artouste IIID turboshaft engine rated at 440 kW (590 hp) for takeoff and 405 kW (543 hp) continuous, but rotor transmission limitations restricted continuous power to 368 kW (493 hp). The SA 316C was only built in small numbers.
- G-Car and K-Car : Helicopter gunship versions for the Rhodesian Air Force. The G-Car was armed with two side-mounted Browning .303 or a single 7.62mm MAG machine guns. The K-Car was armed with a 20 mm MG 151 cannon, fitted inside the cabin, firing from the port side of the helicopter.
- SA.3164 Alouette-Canon: Modified in 1964 as a gunship version armed with a 20mm gun in the nose and external hardpoints for missiles mounted on each side of the fuselage. Only one prototype was built.
- IAR 317 Airfox: A Romanian helicopter gunship project based on the IAR 316. Only three prototypes were ever built.
- Atlas XH-1 Alpha: South African two-seat attack helicopter project. It was used in the development of the Denel Rooivalk.
- K-1 'Chetak', informally- 'Frenchman': 8 HAL Chetaks were bought by the Soviet Union for testing purposes at Kacha airfield, Sevastopol, in 1985, and later 2 of them were used by DOSAAF from Karagoz airfield

== Operators ==
=== Current military operators ===
Angola

- Angola Defence Force

Bolivia

- Bolivian Air Force

Burundi

- Burundi National Army

Chad

- Chad Air Force

COD

- Congo Democratic Air Force

Eswatini

- Eswatini Air Force

Ethiopia

- Ethiopian Air Force

Gabon

- Gabonese Air Force

India

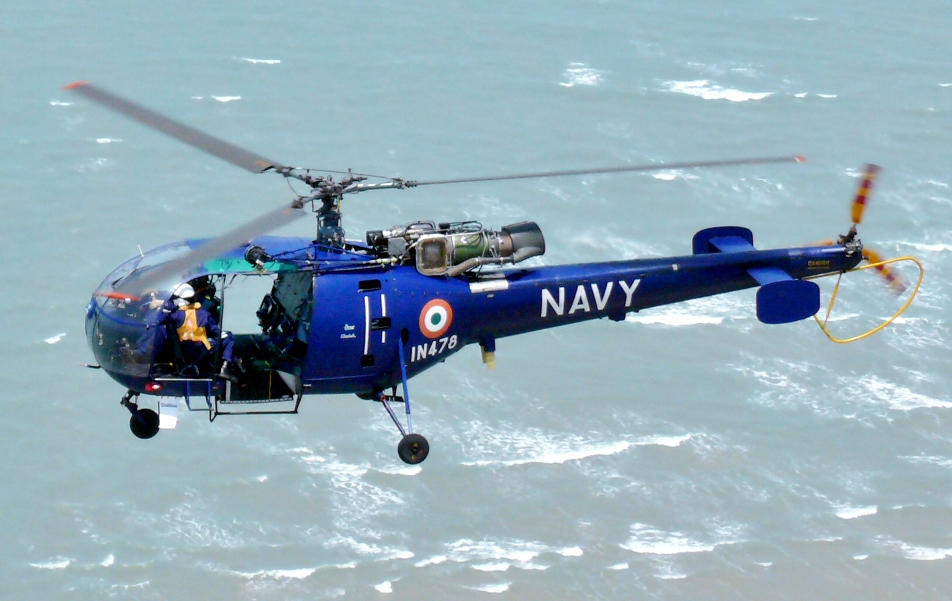
HAL Chetak of the Indian Navy

- Indian Air Force
- Indian Army
- Indian Navy

Mauritius

- Mauritius Police Force

Namibia

- Namibian Air Force

Pakistan

- Pakistan Army
- Pakistan Navy

Suriname

- Surinam Air Force

Tunisia

- Tunisian Air Force

Zimbabwe

- Air Force of Zimbabwe

=== Former military operators ===
Abu Dhabi

- Abu Dhabi Air Wing

Argentina

- Argentine Naval Aviation

Austria

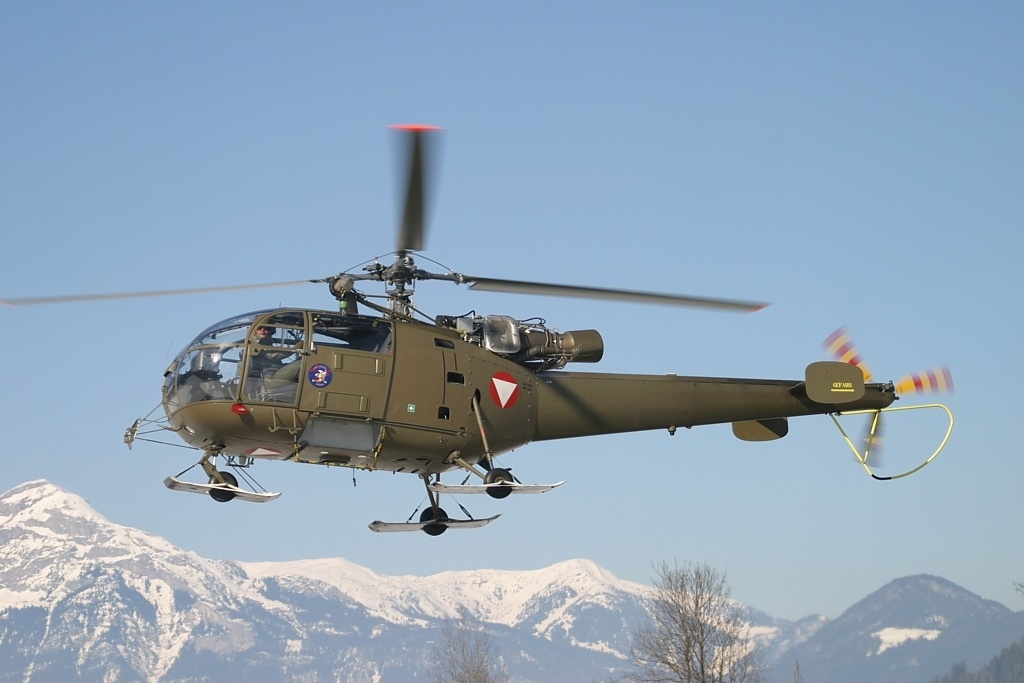
Austrian SE 3160 Alouette III over the Alps

- Austrian Air Force

Belgium

- Belgian Air Component
- Belgian Naval Component

Biafra

- Biafran armed forces

Bangladesh

- Bangladesh Air Force

Bophuthatswana

- Bophuthatswana Air Force

Burma

- Burma Air Force

Cambodia

- Khmer Air Force

Cameroon

- Cameroon Air Force

Chile

- Chilean Navy

Denmark

- Royal Danish Navy

Dominican Republic

- Dominican Air Force

Ecuador

- Ecuadorian Navy

El Salvador

- Salvadoran Air Force

France

- French Air Force
- French Army
- French Navy
- Sécurité Civile

Ghana

- Ghana Air Force

Greece

- Hellenic Navy

Guinea

- Guinean Air Force

Guinea-Bissau

- Guinea-Bissau Air Force

Guyana

- Guyana Defence Force

Hong Kong

- Hong Kong Auxiliary Air Force

Indonesia

- Indonesian Army Aviation

Iraq

- Iraq Air Force

Ireland

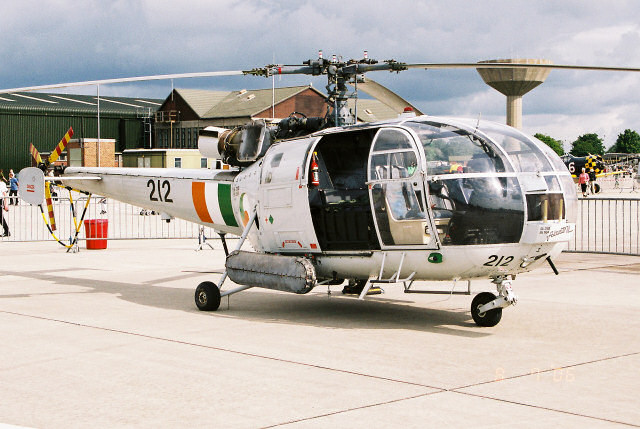
Irish Air Corps SA 316B Alouette III, 212 from 3 Operations Wing at RNAS Yeovilton in July 2006

- Irish Air Corps

Jordan

- Jordanian Air Force

Lebanon

- Lebanese Air Force

Libya

- Libyan Air Force
- Libyan National Army

Malaysia

- Royal Malaysian Air Force
- Malaysian Army Aviation

Madagascar

- Malagasy Air Force

Malawi

- Malawi Army Air Wing

Malta

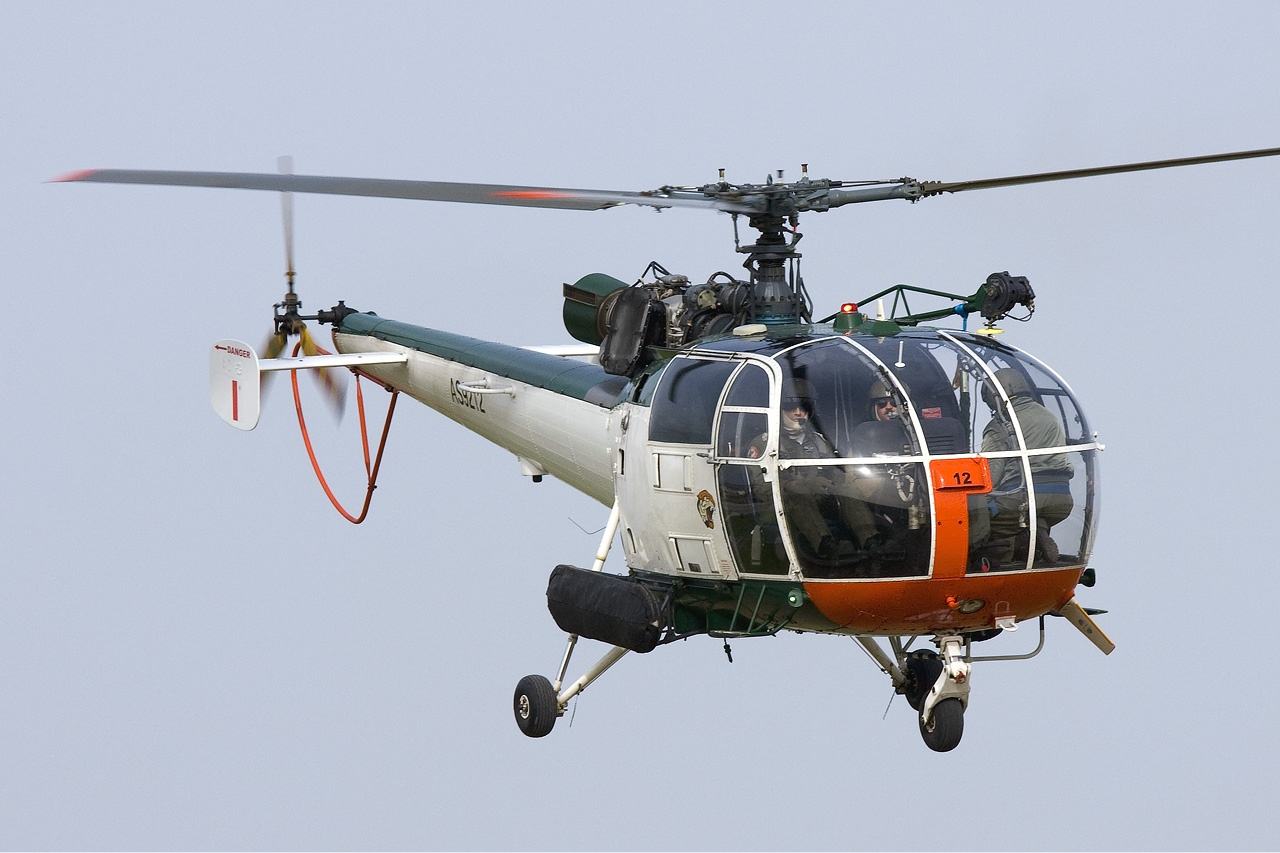
An SA 316B Alouette III used by the Air Wing of the Armed Forces of Malta during a flying display.

- Maltese Air Wing

Mexico

- Mexican Air Force
- Mexican Navy

Morocco

- Royal Moroccan Gendarmerie

Mozambique

- Mozambique Air Force

North Yemen

- Yemen Arab Republic Air Force

Netherlands

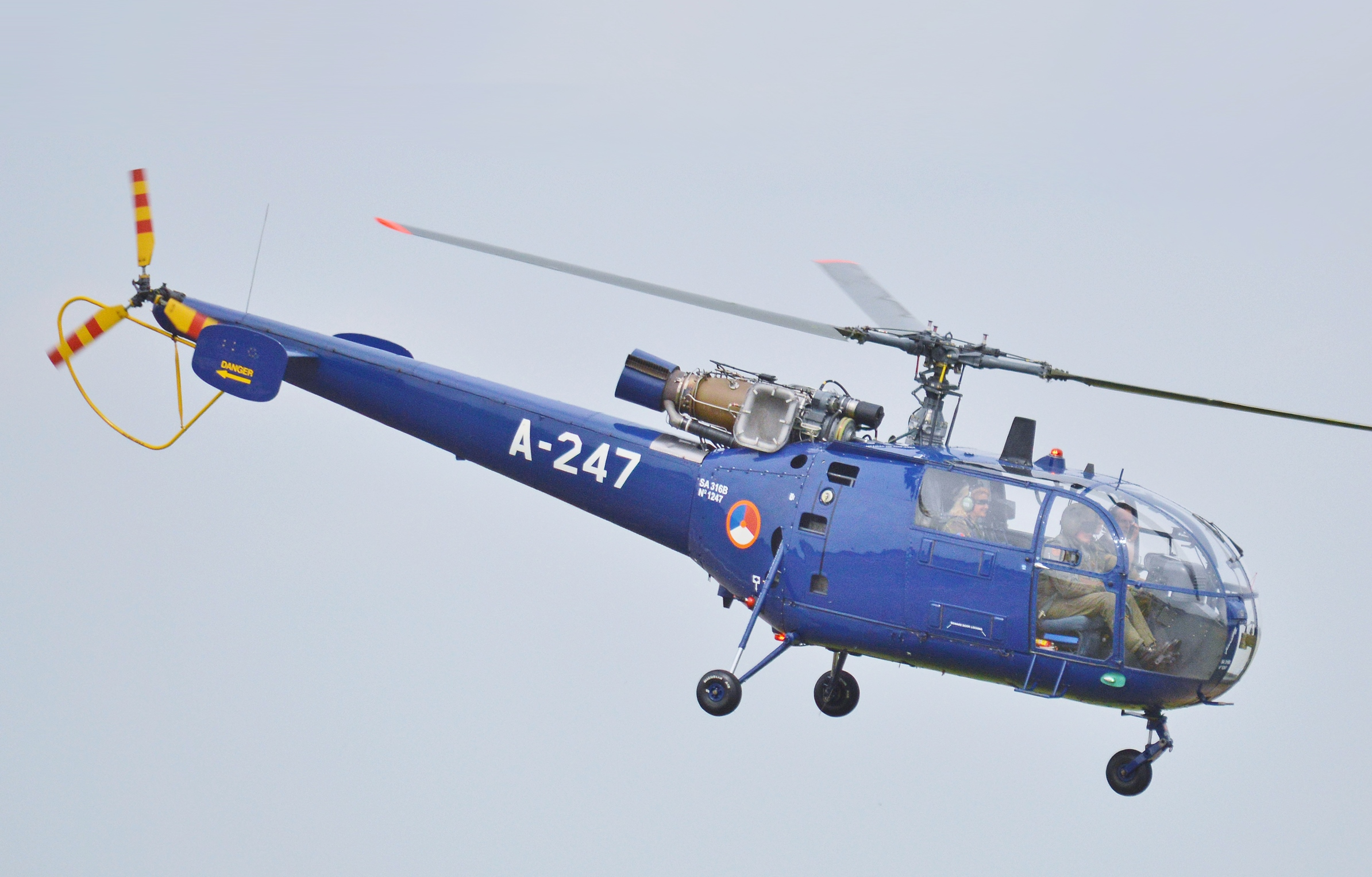
An Alouette III of the Royal Netherlands Air Force

- Royal Netherlands Air Force

Nicaragua

- Sandinista Air Force

Pakistan

- Pakistan Air Force

Peru

- Peruvian Air Force
- Peruvian Army
- Peruvian Naval Aviation

Portugal

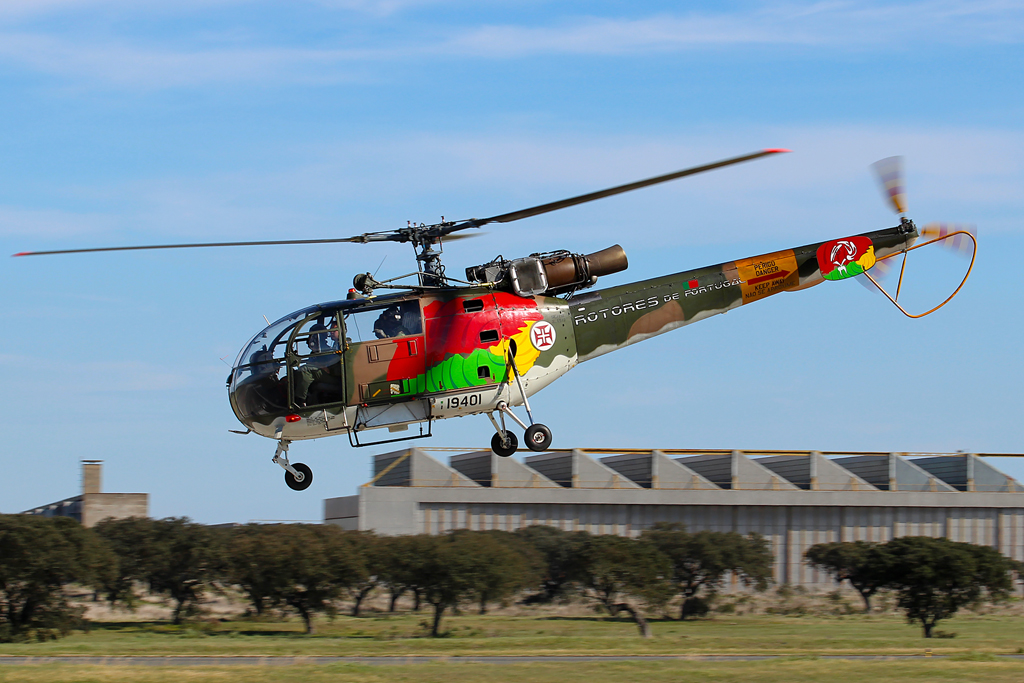
Portuguese Rotores de Portugal aerobatic team's Alouette III helicopter

- Portuguese Air Force

Rhodesia

- Rhodesian Air Force

Rwanda

- Rwandan Defence Force

Saudi Arabia

- Royal Saudi Air Force

Seychelles

- Seychelles Air Force

Singapore

- Singapore Air Force

South Africa

- South African Air Force

South Korea

- Republic of Korea Naval Air Arm

South Vietnam

- South Vietnamese Air Force

Spain

- Spanish Air Force
- Spanish Army

Switzerland

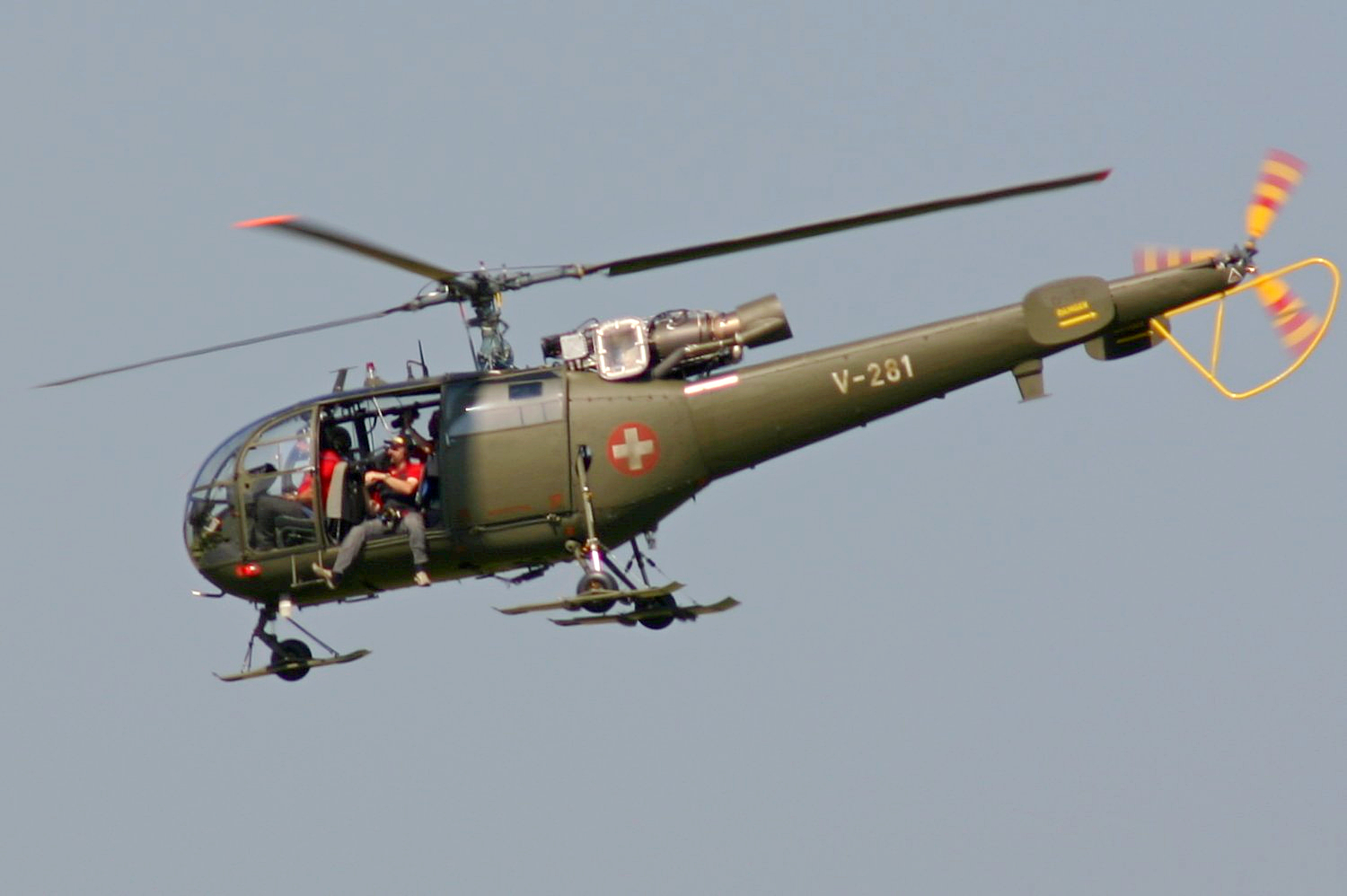
Aérospatiale SE 3160 Alouette III of the Swiss Air Force

- Swiss Air Force

Upper Volta

- Upper Volta Air Force

Venezuela

- Venezuelan Air Force

FR Yugoslavia

- Yugoslav Air Force

Zaire

- Zaire Air Force

== Former civilian operators ==
Slovakia

- Air – Transport Europe

== Specifications (SA 316B) ==

Data from Jane's All The World's Aircraft 1976–77

General characteristics

- Crew: 2
- Capacity: 5 passengers
- Length: 10.03 m (32 ft 11 in)
- Height: 3 m (9 ft 10 in)
- Empty weight: 1,143 kg (2,520 lb)
- Gross weight: 2,200 kg (4,850 lb)
- Powerplant: 1 × Turbomeca Artouste IIIB turboshaft derated to 425 kW (570 hp)
- Main rotor diameter: 11.02 m (36 ft 2 in)
- Main rotor area: 95.38 m^{2} (1,026.7 sq ft)

Performance

- Maximum speed: 210 km/h (130 mph, 110 kn) at sea level
- Cruise speed: 185 km/h (115 mph, 100 kn)
- Range: 540 km (340 mi, 290 nmi)
- Service ceiling: 3,200 m (10,500 ft)
- Rate of climb: 4.3 m/s (850 ft/min)

== See also ==
Related development

- Aérospatiale Alouette II
- Aérospatiale SA 315B Lama
- Aérospatiale Gazelle
- IAR 316
- Atlas XH-1 Alpha

Aircraft of comparable role, configuration, and era

- Hughes OH-6 Cayuse

Related lists

- List of rotorcraft
- List of most-produced rotorcraft
