= SNCASE SE-3101 =

Experimental French helicopter

SE-3101
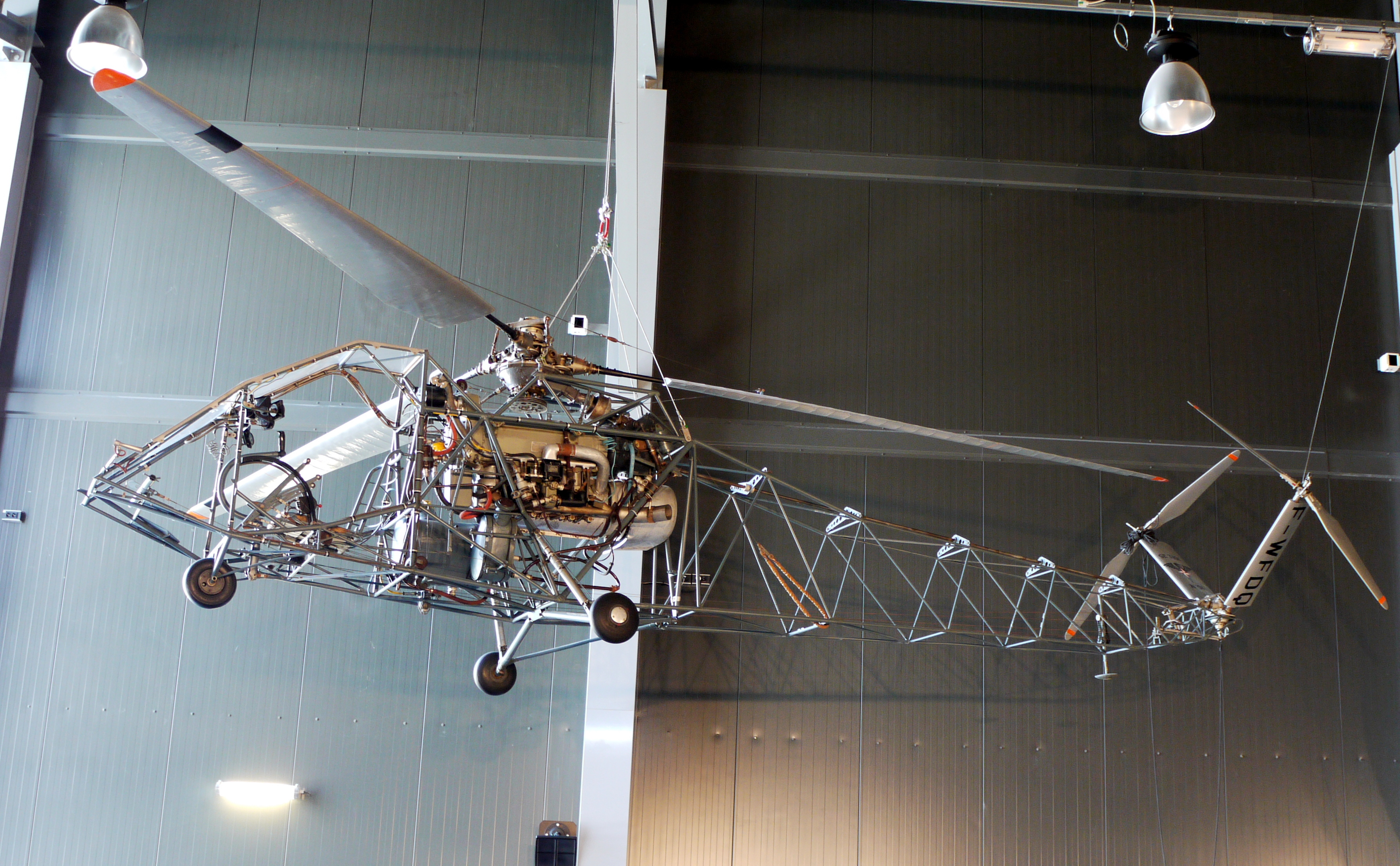
- SE-3101 in the Musée de l’Air et de l’Espace, Le Bourget

General information
- Type: Experimental single seat helicopter
- National origin: France
- Manufacturer: SNCASE (Société nationale des constructions aéronautiques du Sud-Est) or Sud-Est
- Number built: 1

History
- First flight: 15 June 1948

The SNCASE SE-3101 or Sud-Est SE-3101 was an early, experimental French helicopter with twin tail rotors. Only one was built.

== Design and development ==
The SE-3101 is an early, experimental helicopter, developed by the German aviation pioneer Henrich Focke. The helicopter is probably the first French example to have tail anti-torque rotors. It has a single main rotor and a similar layout to many modern helicopters, apart from its use of a double tail rotor. These are mounted with their axes at 45° to the horizontal and with 90° between them, the drive shafts faired within a V-tail-like rear structure. They drive three blade, compressed wood airscrews of 1.60 m (5 ft 3 in) diameter. The three blades of the main rotor each have a steel spar and are fabric covered; rotor diameter is 7.50 m (24 ft 7 in)

The fuselage of the SE-3101 is an uncovered, rectangular cross-section, steel tube structure. An 85 hp (63 kW) Mathis G4R flat four engine is mounted within the fuselage, immediately below the main rotor and behind the pilot, who is provided with some instrumentation and is sheltered by a flat windscreen. The aircraft has a fixed, wheeled tricycle undercarriage, assisted by a small tail skid. First flown on 15 June 1948, development of the SE-3101 led to the Sud-Est SE-3110 and the single tail rotor SE.3120, though none of them entered production.

== Aircraft on display ==
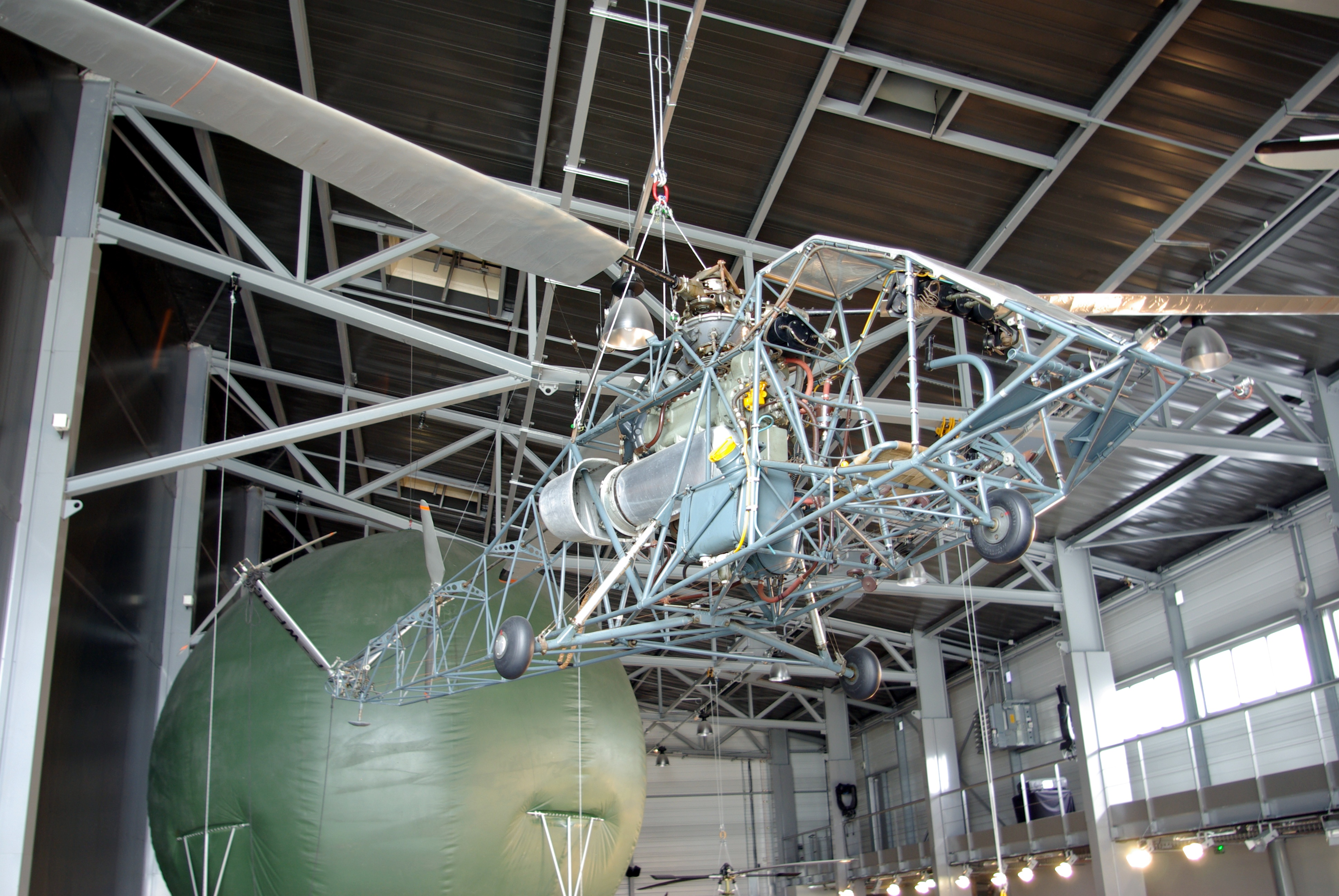
The SE-3101 on display at the Musée de l’Air et de l’Espace

- Musée de l’Air et de l’Espace, Le Bourget: The sole SE-3101, F-WFDQ

== Specifications ==
Data from Jane's All the World's Aircraft 1948

General characteristics

- Crew: One
- Length: 6.90 m (22 ft 8 in) fuselage
- Height: 2.25 m (7 ft 5 in)
- Empty weight: 400 kg (882 lb)
- Gross weight: 520 kg (1,146 lb)
- Powerplant: 1 × Mathis G4R air cooled flat four, 63 kW (85 hp) continuous
- Main rotor diameter: 7.50 m (24 ft 7 in)
- Main rotor area: 44.2 m^{2} (476 sq ft) 3 blades

Performance

- Maximum speed: 129 km/h (80 mph, 70 kn)
- Rate of climb: 4.3 m/s (850 ft/min) in oblique climb
- Disk loading: 11.8 kg/m^{2} (2.4 lb/sq ft)
