= Armagnac (disambiguation) =

Armagnac is a French brandy.

Armagnac may also refer to:

- County of Armagnac, a province of France
  - Count of Armagnac
  - House of Armagnac, a French noble house
- Armagnac (party), a prominent French political party during the Hundred Years' War
- Armagnac battalion, a resistance group in Toulouse organized by George Reginald Starr in advance of the Normandy invasion
- SNCASE Armagnac, a large French airliner of the late 1940s
