= SNCASE Armagnac =

French long range airliner with 4 piston engines, 1949

S.E.2010 Armagnac
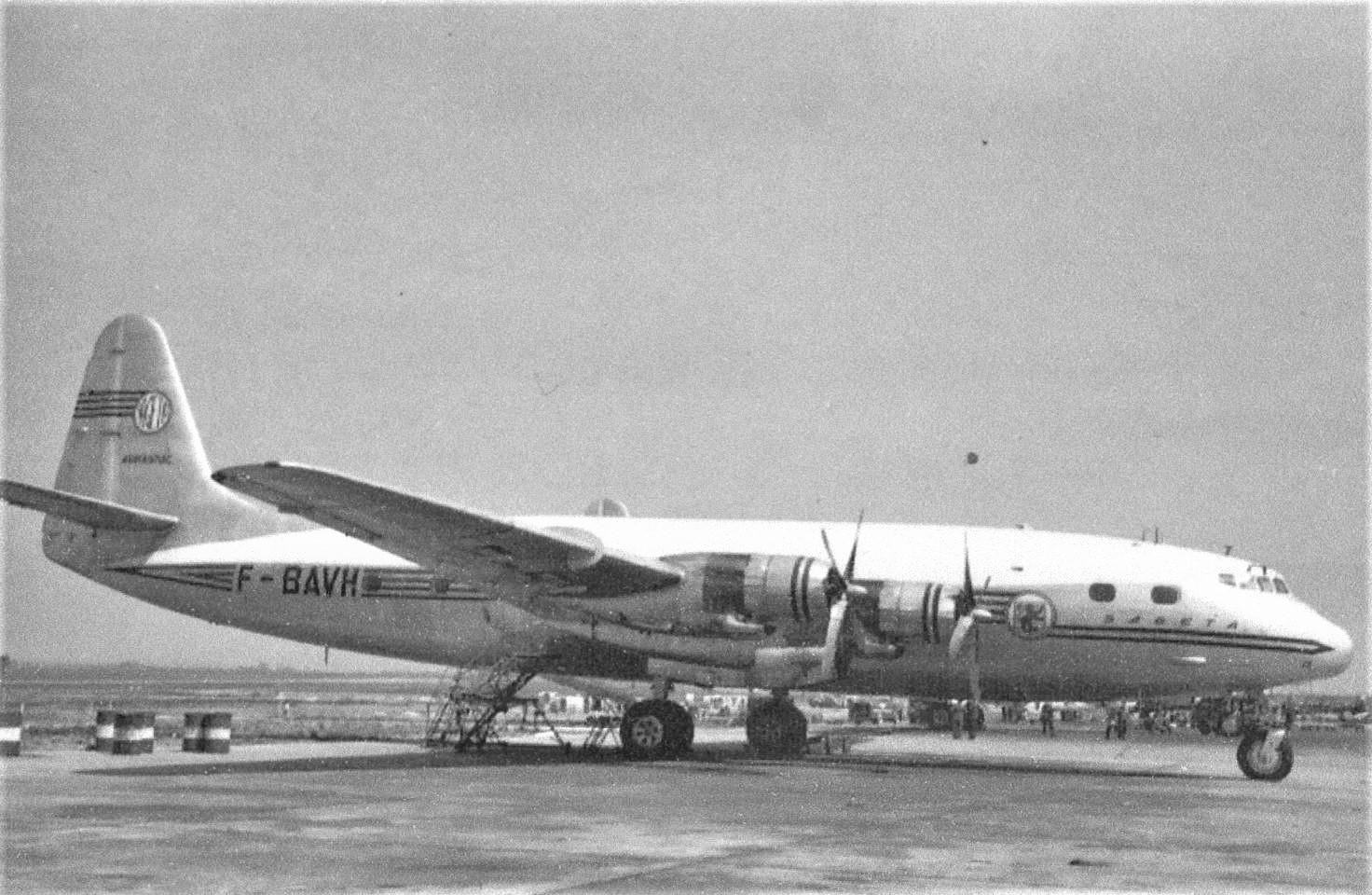
- SAGETA Armagnac at Paris Le Bourget airport in 1957

General information
- Type: Airliner
- Manufacturer: SNCASE
- Primary users: Transports Aériens Intercontinentaux SAGETA
- Number built: 9

History
- Introduction date: December 1952
- First flight: 2 April 1949
- Retired: 1959

The SNCASE S.E.2010 Armagnac was a large French airliner of the late 1940s built by SNCASE (Sud-Est). The aircraft's disappointing performance and range prevented it from achieving commercial success. Although the SNCASE Armagnac did not have a sterling career, its passenger compartment design gave it a much roomier feel and greater capacity and foreshadowed the future wide-body jet airliners.

== Design and development ==
Designed originally around a French requirement for an 87-passenger, long range airliner issued in 1942, the S.E. 2000 was to have been powered by four 2,100 hp Gnome-Rhône 18R engines. At an early stage, the S.E. 2000 was abandoned in favour of a larger, more capable version, the S.E. 2010 Armagnac. The Armagnac was a cantilever mid-wing monoplane with retractable tricycle landing gear designed for transatlantic service. A number of versions were planned from a 60-passenger "sleeping berth" version to 84-passenger, 108-passenger and 160-passenger versions.

After delays to the planning because of wartime conditions, work proceeded quickly at Toulouse, Marseilles and Paris, where various components were being built and tested. The Armagnac was designed from the outset in a Cook-Craigie production line prior to the first prototype which flew on 2 April 1949 with Sud-Est Chief Pilot Pierre Nadot at the controls but was lost on 30 January 1950 while still undergoing tests. The first production series aircraft F-BAVD flew on 30 December 1950. Examples of the S.E.2010 were demonstrated at the 1951 and 1953 Paris Grand Palais.

Although the S.E.2010 was powered by Pratt & Whitney R-4360-B13 Wasp Major engines, the most powerful piston engine ever placed into production for aircraft use, a concern that the final design was underpowered led to a planned redesign. The final (15th) production aircraft was intended to be re-engined with 5,400 hp Allison T40 turboprops, but production was curtailed at eight and the more advanced version was never built. An Armagnac, S.O. 2060, ended its days as an engine test-bed, alternately fitted with turbojet engines fitted in a nacelle below the fuselage. It was tested with two Snecma Atar 101 turbojets each engine having a different system of afterburner. The Snecma Vulcain was also tested in a similar manner.

== Operational history ==
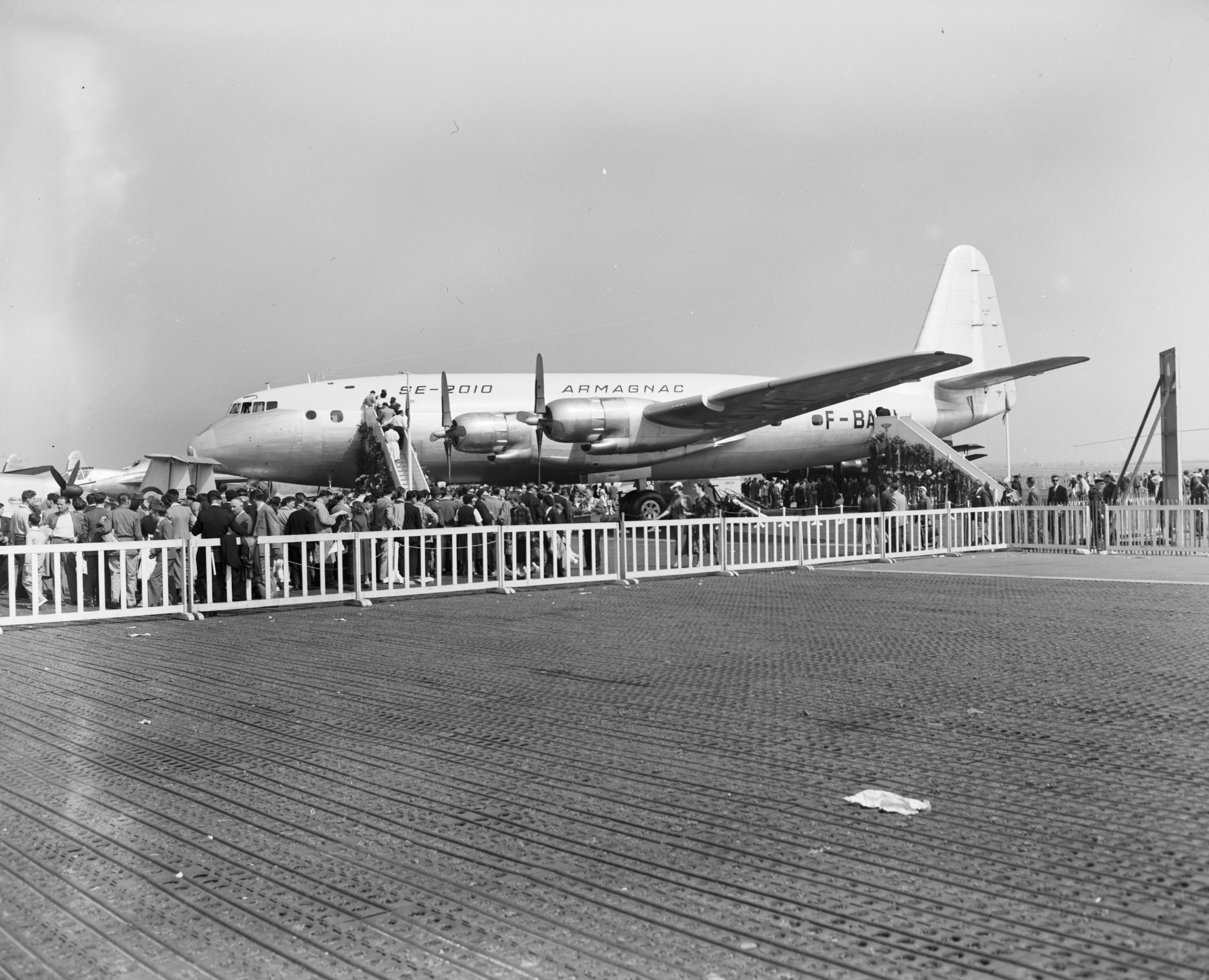
F-BAVH at 1953 Paris Air Show

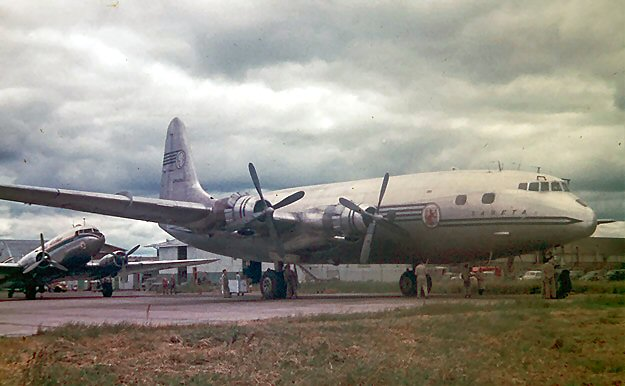
F-BAVI used at the 1956 Olympic Games, Melbourne, Australia

At the time, the Armagnac was one of the largest civil aircraft ever built with a wingspan of almost 50 meters and weight over 77 tonnes. The capacious pressurized cabin (with a near-circular fuselage section with 4.7 m/ 15 ft width and height) was intended for a three tier sleeping compartment configuration which ultimately was not fitted to any of the S.E.2010 versions. The fuselage was left with a good deal of unusable space with only open luggage shelves mounted in the upper fuselage.

Initial production of 15 aircraft was planned for delivery to launch customer Air France. After evaluation of the prototype by Air France, the airline declined delivery in 1952 when the first production aircraft was ready, citing inadequate performance. Despite being designed for transatlantic service, the aircraft's range of 5,000 km, fell short of the 6,500 km required range for this use. Additionally, the aircraft was too large to be operated profitably for shorter range routes.

Including the sole prototype, only nine aircraft were built with TAI (Transports Aériens Intercontinentaux) (later UTA) evaluating the first production aircraft in April 1952. A total of four S.E.2010s were delivered to TAI in December 1952, who used them for eight months and then discarded them as unprofitable. The aircraft passed to SAGETA (the Société Auxiliaire de Gérance et d'Exploitation de Transport Aériens) in 1953 who operated seven Armagnacs to ferry cargo, mail and troops from Toulouse to Saigon in French Indochina. They were highly regarded in this role, but French rule in the area was almost over and they were surplus by mid-1954.

Most Armagnacs were broken up in 1955 although two were used to transport the French contingent to the 1956 Olympic Games held in Melbourne, Victoria, Australia. Jack Russell, a retired Australian Air Traffic Controller fondly recalled the Armagnac which was the most distinctive of the various aircraft types to visit Australia for the Games. His description: "...an 80-ton aircraft which resembled two shipping containers welded together lengthways with a wing and two under-powered engines protruding on each side. The aircraft's performance matched its appearance." Visiting aircraft were ferried to Mangalore Airport. While passing above a Mangalore-bound Armagnac, a Trans Australia Airlines pilot when asked to report the S.E. 2010's position, exclaimed "If it's that block of flats below us, we're passing it now!" F-BAVI, one of the Melbourne caravan was the last SNCASE Armagnac survivor, and was scrapped in 1975 at Bordeaux/Merignac after having lain derelict for many years.

== Operators ==
France

- Transports Aériens Intercontinentaux (TAI)
- Société Auxiliaire de Gérance et de Transport Aériens (SAGETA)

== Incidents and accidents ==
On 30 June 1950, F-WAVA, the prototype was lost after it crashed and caught fire on takeoff after a wing leading edge panel separated. Two fatalities on board and one on the ground resulted. SAGETA F-BAVG flying out of Tunis on 29 January 1957, crashed at Paris-Orly in inclement weather, resulting in two fatalities. While flying from Algeria, on 19 December 1957, F-BAVH flying for SAGETA, was crippled midair when a bomb detonated in the lavatory, causing a large hole in the fuselage. Despite the severe damage, a safe emergency landing was carried out at Lyon, 90 minutes later.

== Specifications ==
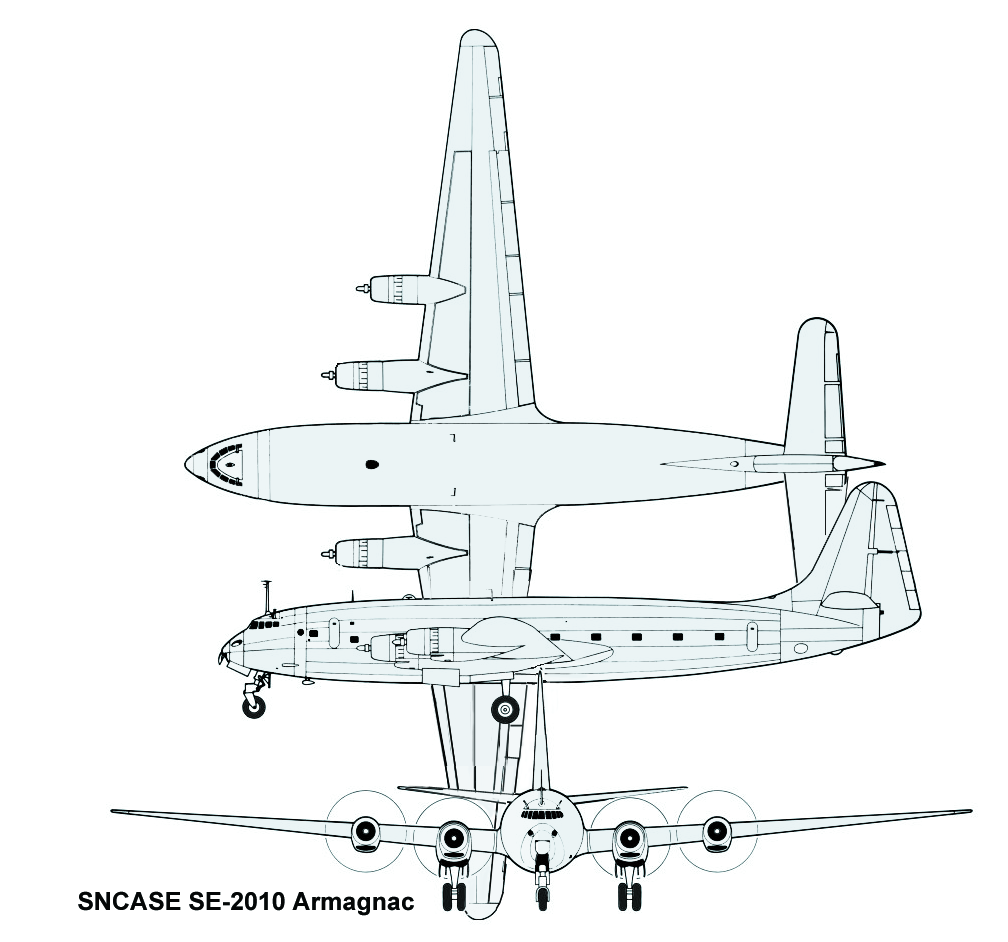
3-view of SNCASE SE-2010 Armagnac

Data from Jane's all the World's Aircraft 1947, French Postwar Transport Aircraft

General characteristics

- Crew: 6-9 (with relief crew) + 3-4 cabin crew
- Capacity: 60 to 160 pax
- Length: 39.6 m (129 ft 11 in)
- Wingspan: 48.95 m (160 ft 7 in)
- Height: 11.4 m (37 ft 5 in)
- Wing area: 236 m^{2} (2,540 sq ft)
- Empty weight: 30,409 kg (67,040 lb) 4,000 km (2,500 mi) range, 60 pax plus 5,600 kg (12,300 lb) of freight.
- Gross weight: 67,082 kg (147,890 lb) 4,000 km (2,500 mi) range, 60 pax plus 5,600 kg (12,300 lb) of freight.
- Max takeoff weight: 77,500 kg (170,858 lb)
- Powerplant: 4 × Pratt & Whitney R-4360-B13 Wasp Major 28-cylinder 4-row air-cooled radial piston engine, 2,600 kW (3,500 hp) each
- Propellers: 4-bladed Curtiss-Electric C644-5-B-306 constant-speed reversible propellers

Performance

- Maximum speed: 580 km/h (360 mph, 310 kn) at 7,500 m (24,600 ft)
- Cruise speed: 450 km/h (280 mph, 240 kn) at 6,000 m (20,000 ft)
- Landing speed: 156 km/h (97 mph; 84 kn)
- Range: 5,120 km (3,180 mi, 2,760 nmi) maximum
- Service ceiling: 6,800 m (22,300 ft)
- Wing loading: 280 kg/m^{2} (57 lb/sq ft) 4,000 km (2,500 mi) range, 60 pax plus 5,600 kg (12,300 lb) of freight.
- Power/mass: 6.075 kg/kW (10.5 lb/hp)

== See also ==
Aircraft of comparable role, configuration, and era

- Boeing 377 Stratocruiser
- Bristol Britannia
- Douglas DC-7
- Lockheed Constellation

Related lists

- List of civil aircraft

== Bibliography ==
- Delmas, Jean (March 1970). "L'espoir d'un long-courrier, qui tourna court: S.E. 2010 Armagnac" [The Hope of a Long-haul Aircraft That Was Cut Short: The S.E. 2010 Armagnac]. Le album de fanatique de l'Aviation (in French) (9): 16–21. ISSN 0757-4169.
- Green, William and Gerald Pollinger. The Aircraft of the World. London: Macdonald, 1955.
- The Illustrated Encyclopedia of Aircraft (Part Work 1982–1985). London: Orbis Publishing, 1985.
- Stroud, John. "S.E.2010 Armagnac." Aeroplane Monthly, Volume 21, no. 11, Issue no. 247, November 1993.
