= SNCASE =

French aircraft manufacturer

Société nationale des constructions aéronautiques du Sud-Est
- Industry: Aerospace, defence
- Predecessor: Lioré et Olivier, Potez, Chantiers Aéro-Maritimes de la Seine, Chantiers aéronavals Étienne Romano & Société Provençale de Constructions Aéronautiques
- Founded: France (February 1, 1937)
- Defunct: March 1, 1957
- Fate: Merged
- Successor: Sud Aviation
- Headquarters: Toulouse, France
- Key people: René Mouille
- Products: Aircraft; Missiles

SNCASE (abbreviated from Société nationale des constructions aéronautiques du Sud-Est) or Sud-Est was a French aircraft manufacturer. The company was formed on February 1, 1937, by the nationalization and merger of Lioré et Olivier, Potez, CAMS, Romano and SPCA.

== History ==
Following the resolution of the 1936 general strike of French heavy industry, the government of Léon Blum introduced an act to nationalize the French war industry. The act provided for the creation of seven nationalized aeronautical manufacturing companies: six for aircraft (SNCASE, SNCASO, SNCAN, SNCAO, SNCAM, SNCAC), and one for aircraft engines (SNCM - Lorraine-Dietrich).

SNCASE incorporated the facilities of Potez in Berre-l'Étang, CAMS in Vitrolles, Romano in Cannes, SPCA in Marseille and Lioré et Olivier at Argenteuil and Marignane. SNCASE became the largest of the aeronautical Sociétés nationales, with 225000 m^{2} of space in six factories and 2550 employees. (1700 of the workforce came from Lioré et Olivier, along with 90% of then-current manufacturing contracts.)

In 1941, during the Second World War, the Paris design bureaus of both the nationalized and the private aircraft firms were relocated to avoid capture. SNCASE acquired the failing SNCAM and moved its engineering operations to SNCAM's headquarters at the former Dewoitine factory in Toulouse.

During the rationalisation of the nationalised Aircraft Industry during the 1950s, SNCASE merged with SNCASO to form Sud Aviation on March 1, 1957, which in turn was later amalgamated into Aérospatiale and eventually the Airbus group.

== Products ==
Most early Sud-Est aircraft retained their earlier designations, such as the Lioré et Olivier LeO 451 bomber. The first aircraft produced under the Sud-Est marque was the Sud-Est SE 100 (formerly Leo 50) fighter.

As well as fixed winged aircraft work, SNCASE carried out research into rotary-winged aircraft capitalising on the experience gained from absorbing the Liore et Olivier team which had license-built the Cierva C.30 design (as the LeO C.30 and C.301 to C.305 variants), and designing and building the LeO C.34 (derived from Kellett designs). After World War II further work on autogyro's produced the SE.700 and SE.700A multi-seat Liaison autogyros, which were quickly overshadowed by the rapid development of helicopters.

SNCASE continued experimenting with helicopters with the help from a team from Focke Achgelis building the SE.3000, which was a French version of the twin-rotor Focke Achgelis Fa 223 Drache, and the smaller, more conventional, SE.3101. With this experience SNCASE went on to design the SE.3110 and eventually the SE.3120 Alouette which first flew on 21 July 1951 and broke the helicopter distance and speed records in July 1953. Production versions of the Alouette emerged as the commercially successful Alouette II and Alouette III, resulting in production runs of several hundreds, with many exported.

Fixed wing aircraft were also developed post World War II, with several jet research aircraft and two significant airliners: The SE-2010 Armagnac and the SE-210 Caravelle airliners. Production licences were also obtained from de Havilland for the de Havilland Sea Venom to provide all-weather and day fighters for the Aéronautique Navale., with 121 two-seat and single-seat Aquilon 20 / 201 / 202 / 203 / 204 built from 1952.

=== SNCASE aircraft production ===
Early three digit sequence

- SNCASE SE.100 (developed from Liore et Olivier LeO 50) (1939)
- SNCASE SE.161 Languedoc (developed from Bloch 160) (1939)
- SNCASE SE.200 Amphitrite (1942)
- SNCASE SE-400 (1939)
- SNCASE SE-700 & 700A (1945)

Four digit model sequence

- SNCASE SE-1010 (1948)
- SNCASE SE-1210 (1948)
- SNCASE SE-2010 Armagnac (1949)
- SNCASE SE-2100 (1945)
- SNCASE SE-2300 & 2310 (1945)
- SNCASE SE-2410 & 2415 Grognard (1950)
- SNCASE SE-5000 & 5003 Baroudeur (1953)

Helicopters (3000-series designation sequence)

- SNCASE SE-3000 (development of Focke-Achgelis Fa 223) (1948)
- SNCASE SE-3101 (1948)
- SNCASE SE-3110 (1950)
- SNCASE SE.3120 Alouette (1951)
- SNCASE SE-3130 Alouette II & SE-3131 Gouverneur (1955)
- SNCASE SE-3150 Lama (1969)
- SNCASE SE-3160 Alouette III (1959)
- SNCASE SE-3200 Frelon (1959)

Late three digit designation sequence

- SNCASE SE-116 & 117 Voltigeur (1958)
- SNCASE SE-210 Caravelle (1955)
- SNCASE SE.212 Durandal (1956)

=== Designs built under licence ===
- SNCASE SE-532-535 Mistral; license-built de Havilland Vampire (1951)
- SNCASE Aquilon; license-built de Havilland Sea Venom (1952)
