= SNCASE SE-3110 =

SE-3110

General information
- Type: Two seat helicopter
- National origin: France
- Manufacturer: SNCASE (Sud-Est)
- Designer: Marchetti and Renoux
- Number built: 1 or 2

History
- First flight: 10 June 1950

The SNCASE SE-3110 or Sud-Est SE-3110 was a French two seat experimental helicopter with unusual twin, angled tail rotors, first flown in 1950. After brief tests SNCASE decided to concentrate on a closely related but single-tail-rotor design.

== Design and development ==
The SE-3110 drew heavily on the design and development of the 1948 SE-3101, sharing much of the latter's control system and also its unusual twin tail rotors. Externally it was much more refined, with a rounded forward pod for occupants and engine and a slender tail boom. The two crew sat side by side behind a fully glazed nose; structurally the pod was a light monocoque. A 149 kW (200 hp) Salmson 9 Nh nine cylinder, air-cooled radial engine was mounted horizontally under a transmission box attached to the fuselage by steel tubes and driving a three-blade rotor. Some sources give the engine as a 130 kW (175 hp) Salmson 9 Nc, which was probably fitted to the first ground test article. The tail rotors were mounted above the end of the boom on shafts at right angles to it and to each other, so that the rotor planes were leaning inwards at 45° to the vertical. At least one image shows the drive shafts within slender fairings but several others show them bare. The SE-3110 landed on small wheels mounted on cantilever legs on each side and a long, forward-pointing, sprung skid.

As on the SE-3101, differential pitch settings of the twin tail rotors compensated main rotor torque; there were mechanical linkages between the collective pitch, the throttle and the tail pitch control to lower the pilot's workload. Directional control was achieved by altering the tail pitch difference and the tail could be lifted or depressed, giving longitudinal control (aircraft pitch), in the same way. A new feature on the SE-3110 was longitudinal trim control via the main rotor cyclic pitch.

The SE.3110 first flew on 10 June 1950, piloted by Jaques Lacarme. Gaillard states that the first prototype made only two flights at low altitude before being abandoned in favour of the SE-3120 Alouette I. However, other sources say that two SE-3110s were built, appearing on the French civil register initially as F-WFUD and F-WFUE, later transferring to the B list (after gaining their Certificates of Airworthiness) as F-BFUD and F-BFUE. In Liron's account the first prototype was retained for ground durability testing but the first flight of the second prototype on 15 September 1950 rapidly ended with loss of control and a side-on crash, though Lacarme walked away. SNCASE decided the way forward lay with the single tail rotor and with main rotor blades stabilized to prevent excessive flapping, both features of the SE-3120.

== Specifications ==
Data from Gaillard (1990)

General characteristics

- Crew: Two
- Length: 11.13 m (36 ft 6 in)
- Empty weight: 670 kg (1,477 lb)
- Max takeoff weight: 950 kg (2,094 lb)
- Powerplant: 1 × Salmson 9 Nh 9-cylinder, air-cooled radial, 150 kW (200 hp)
- Main rotor diameter: 12 m (39 ft 4 in)
- Main rotor area: 113 m^{2} (1,220 sq ft) 3 blade

Performance

- Maximum speed: 177 km/h (110 mph, 96 kn)
- Cruise speed: 130 km/h (81 mph, 70 kn)
- Range: 300 km (190 mi, 160 nmi)
- Service ceiling: 4,500 m (14,800 ft)
