= SNCASE SE.3120 Alouette =

SE.3120 Alouette

General information
- Type: Utility helicopter
- National origin: France
- Manufacturer: SNCASE
- Status: Prototypes only
- Number built: 2

History
- First flight: 31 July 1951

The SNCASE SE.3120 Alouette ("Lark") was a utility helicopter developed in France in the early 1950s but which did not enter production. Designed in parallel with the SE.3110, the Alouette shared that machine's dynamic components, with the exception of the SE.3110's unusual twin tail rotor, which was replaced by a single rotor, and the addition of a three-bladed gyroscopic stabiliser under the main rotor (similar to the stabiliser bar used by Bell helicopters. The Alouette featured an open-framework fuselage behind a cockpit that was enclosed by a bubble canopy. Skid undercarriage and tricycle gear were both tested.

The first flight took place on 31 July 1951 at Buc, Yvelines with test pilot Henri Stakenburg at the controls. On 2 July 1953, Jean Boulet flew one of the two prototype Alouettes to a world closed-circuit distance record for a helicopter in this class, covering 1,252 km (778 mi) in 13 hours and 56 minutes. Despite this impressive performance, the Alouette proved to be difficult to maintain, with its obsolete Salmson engine not being powerful enough, and with work on the turbine-powered Alouette II (an unrelated design) already underway, development of the Alouette was soon abandoned.

== Specifications ==
Data from Jane's All The World's Aircraft 1953–54

General characteristics

- Crew: 1
- Capacity: 2 passengers
- Length: 10.45 m (34 ft 3 in)
- Height: 2.90 m (9 ft 6 in)
- Empty weight: 750 kg (1,653 lb)
- Gross weight: 1,250 kg (2,756 lb)
- Powerplant: 1 × Salmson 9NH 9-cylinder air-cooled radial engine, 150 kW (200 hp)
- Main rotor diameter: 11.60 m (38 ft 1 in)
- Main rotor area: 105.7 m^{2} (1,138 sq ft)

Performance

- Maximum speed: 201 km/h (125 mph, 109 kn)
- Endurance: 2 1/4 hr
- Service ceiling: 4,000 m (13,000 ft)
- Rate of climb: 4.50 m/s (885 ft/min)
