= Jean Boulet (aviator) =

French aviator (1920–2011)

Jean Boulet (French: [ʒɑ̃ bulɛ]; 16 November 1920, Brunoy – 13 February 2011, Aix-en-Provence) was a French aviator. In 1957, Boulet was awarded the Aeronautical Medal; in 1983, he became one of the founding members of the French National Air and Space Academy. He died at the age of 90.

== Early life ==
He was born on 16 November 1920 in Brunoy, near Paris. Jean Boulet was a graduate of the Ecole Polytechnique, which he entered in 1940. He was first hired in 1947 by the SNCASE, which would become Sud Aviation and then later the helicopter division of Aérospatiale.

== Career ==
Jean was trained in the United States earlier in his life to become a military pilot with the French Air Force, he was one of the first foreign pilots to fly a helicopter in the United States Air Force. Over the years he would become one of the greatest pioneers in the history of rotorcraft flight testing.

=== Aviation records ===
Boulet set several rotorcraft records for distance, altitude and speed.

On 21 June 1972, Boulet set the world record (still valid as of 2020) for the highest altitude reached by a helicopter, when he piloted an Aérospatiale SA 315B Lama to an altitude of 12,442 metres (40,820 ft). When he reduced power and began to descend, because of the extreme cold, the engine flamed out, and Boulet performed the highest ever full touch down autorotation, landing with absolutely no power. This high altitude autorotation also set a new world record. Because of his unpowered flight back to the ground, he is also credited with the largest altitude flown with an autogyro.

== Publications ==
- L'Histoire de L'hélicoptère, Racontée Par Ses Pionniers, 1907-1956 (Editions France-Empire, 1982) OCLC 256047560
- History Of The Helicopter: As Told By Its Pioneers, 1907-1956, Claude Dawson (translator) (Editions France-Empire, 1984) OCLC 13284968
