= Rhodesia United Air Carriers =

IATA	ICAO	Call sign
N/A	N/A	?
- Founded: 1957
- Focus cities: None
- Fleet size: 14
- Destinations: Domestic, South Africa
- Headquarters: Salisbury, Rhodesia
- Key people: Coleman Meyers
- Website: None

Rhodesia United Air Carriers (RUAC) was a company formed in 1957 by the amalgamation of several existing charter companies; Air Carriers Limited and Flights (1956) of Salisbury, and Fishair of Victoria Falls. Commercial Air Services (Rhodesia) of Bulawayo was integrated into RUAC in August 1960, following the merger of its holding company, Airwork Ltd (also known as Airwork Services), with Hunting-Clan (which had owned Air Carriers Ltd), a subsidiary of the maritime company Clan Line.

RUAC was a Beechcraft agent for Central Africa. They operated a fleet of Beech Barons, several Piper Apache and Aztec aircraft, a De Havilland Dove, a Beechcraft Musketeer and a Beechcraft Bonanza.

The company had bases at Salisbury (head office and maintenance base), Bulawayo and Victoria Falls.
