= Continental O-526 =

O-526
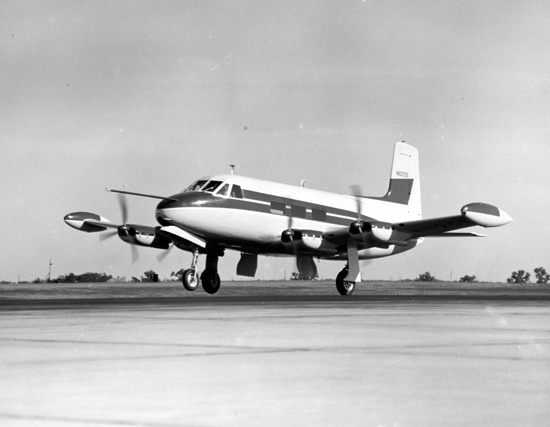
- The sole Cessna 620, powered by Continental GSO-526A engines
- Type: Piston aircraft engine
- National origin: USA
- Manufacturer: Continental Motors
- Major applications: Cessna 620
- Manufactured: 1957

The Continental O-526 is a family of air-cooled flat-6 aircraft piston engines built by Teledyne Continental Motors.

== Development ==
Constructionally similar to the O-470 series the O-526 has larger cylinders of increased bore and stroke, giving a displacement of 526 cu in (8,620 cc). The O-526 was introduced with reduction gearing and a supercharger as the GSO-526 for the Cessna 620.

== Specifications (GSO-526) ==
Data from Jane's all the World's Aircraft 1955-56.

=== General characteristics ===
- Type: 6-cylinder air-cooled horizontally opposed aircraft piston engine
- Bore: 5.125 in (130.2 mm)
- Stroke: 4.25 in (108 mm)
- Displacement: 526 cu in (8.62 L)
- Length: 52.8 in (1,340 mm)
- Width: 36 in (910 mm)
- Height: 23.9 in (610 mm)
- Dry weight: 540 lb (240 kg)dry

=== Components ===
- Fuel type: 91/96 Octane
- Cooling system: Air-cooled

=== Performance ===
- Power output: 320 hp (240 kW) at 3,000 rpm for take-off
- Specific power: 0.58 hp/in³ (26.5 kW/L)
- Compression ratio: 6.0:1
- Power-to-weight ratio: 0.593 hp/lb (0.97 kW/kg)

== See also ==
Related lists

- List of aircraft engines
