= Continental Aerospace Technologies =

Piston powered aircraft engine manufacturer located in Mobile, AL

- Type: Public
- Industry: Aircraft engines
- Predecessor: Continental Motors Corporation
- Founded: 1905
- Headquarters: Mobile, Alabama, United States
- Key people: Karen Hong, CEO (since September 2026)
- Owner: Publicly traded company since 2018
- Parent: Ryan Aeronautical (1965–1969); Teledyne (1969–2011); AVIC International Group Limited (2011 – 2026); Arcline Investment Management (2026 – present)
- Divisions: Continental Aviation and Engineering
- Subsidiaries: Gray Marine Motor Company (1944–1967)
- Website: http://continental.aero

Continental Aerospace Technologies, a portfolio company of Arcline Investment Management, is an aircraft engine manufacturer located at the Brookley Aeroplex in Mobile, Alabama, United States. It was originally spun off from automobile engine manufacturer Continental Motors Company in 1929 and owned by Teledyne Technologies from 1969 until December 2010.

Although Continental is most well known for its engines for light aircraft, it was also contracted to produce the air-cooled V-12 AV-1790-5B gasoline engine for the U.S. Army's M47 Patton tank and the diesel AVDS-1790-2A and its derivatives for the M48, M60 Patton, and Merkava main battle tanks. The company also produced engines for various independent manufacturers of automobiles, tractors, and stationary equipment (pumps, generators, and machinery drives) from the 1920s to the 1960s.

== History ==
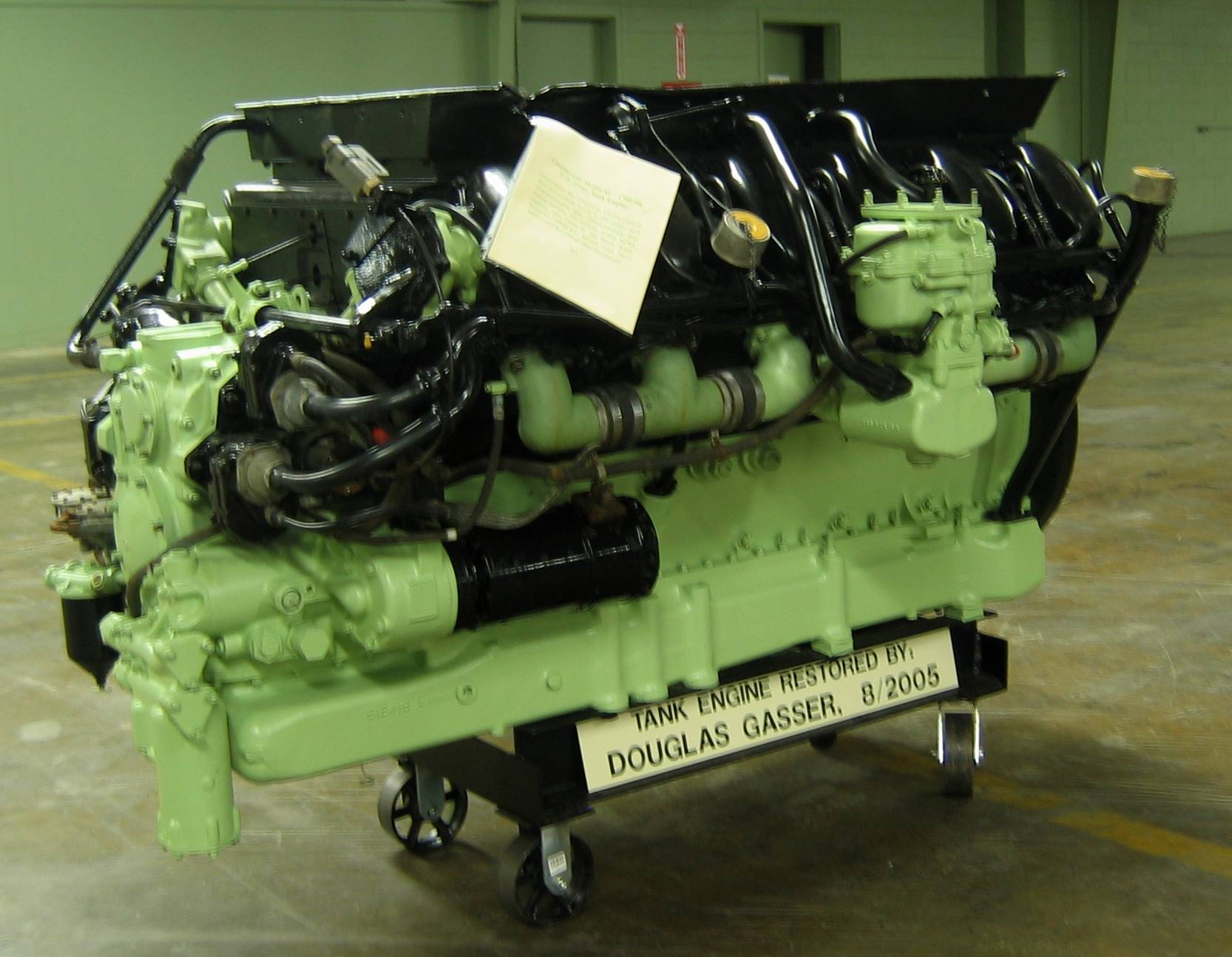
Restored Continental AV1790-5B tank engine at the American Armored Foundation Tank Museum in Danville, Virginia.

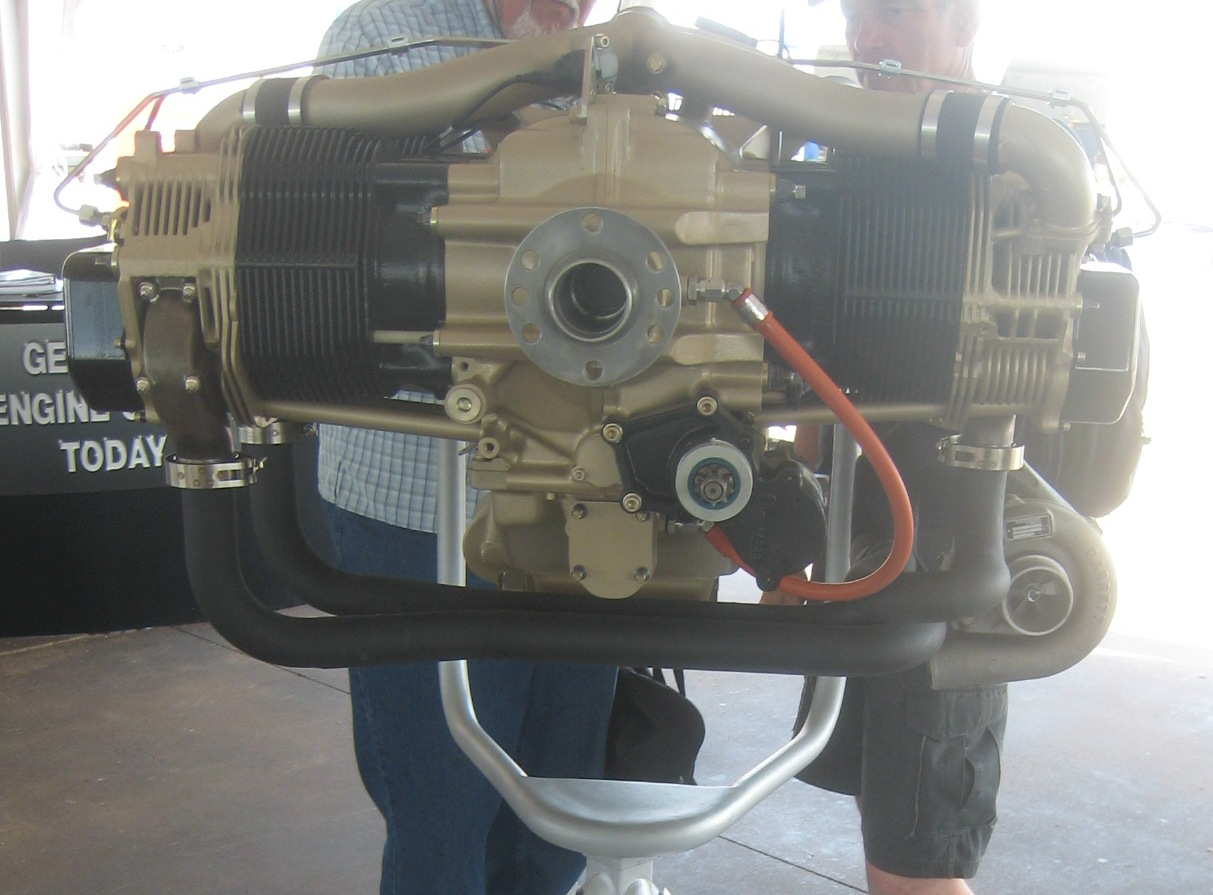
TD-300 Diesel Engine

In 1929, the company introduced its first aircraft engine, a seven-cylinder radial designated as the A-70, with a displacement of 543.91 cu in (8.9 L) that produced 170 hp (127 kW). In August 1929, the Continental Motors Company formed the Continental Aircraft Engine Company as a subsidiary to develop and produce its aircraft engines.

As the Great Depression unwound, 1930 saw the company introduce the 37 hp (28 kW) A40 four-cylinder engine. A follow-on design, the 50 hp (37 kW) A50 was introduced in 1938 and was used to power the Taylor Cub and derivative Piper Cub. As the Second World War started in 1939 Continental commenced building aircraft engines for use in British and American tanks. Continental formed Continental Aviation and Engineering (CAE) in 1940 to develop and produce aircraft engines of over 500 hp (373 kW). Continental ranked 38th among United States corporations in the value of wartime production contracts.

During the late 1930s and early 1940s, the Gray Marine Motor Company adapted Continental engines for maritime use. On 14 June 1944, the company was purchased by Continental for US$2.6 million. John W. Mulford, the son of one of Gray's founders was appointed general manager of Gray by Continental. Gray continued to make marine engines in the post-war period until its closure by Continental in about 1967.

During the 1950s, the A-65 was developed into the more powerful 90 hp (67 kW) C-90 and eventually into the 100 hp (75 kW) O-200. The O-200 powered a very important airplane design milestone: the Cessna 150. By the 1960s, turbocharging and fuel injection arrived in general aviation, and the company's IO-520 series came to dominate the market.

In 1965, Ryan Aeronautical acquired a 50% stake in Continental Motors. The following year, Continental announced that it would open an overhaul facility in the 180,000-square-foot (17,000 m^{2}) Building 16 at Brookley Air Force Base in Mobile, Alabama.

In 1969, Teledyne Incorporated acquired Continental Motors, which became Teledyne Continental Motors (TCM). That same year, the Continental Tiara series of high output engines were introduced, although they were dropped from the line after 1978. The company brought the TSIO-520-BE for the Piper PA-46 to market in 1984, and it set new efficiency standards for light aircraft piston engines. Powered by a liquid-cooled version of the IO-240, the Rutan Voyager was the first piston-powered aircraft to circumnavigate the world without refueling in 1986.

NASA selected Continental to develop and produce GAP in 1997, a new 200 hp (150 kW) piston engine to operate on Jet-A fuel. This was in response to 100-octane aviation gasoline becoming less available as a result of decreased demand, due to smaller turboprop engines becoming more prevalent.

Logo used from 2011 to 2019

In 2008, Teledyne Continental's new president, Rhett Ross announced that the company was very concerned about future availability of 100LL avgas and as a result would develop a diesel engine in the 300 hp (220 kW) range for certification in 2009 or 2010. By the fall of 2009 the company was feeling the effects of the economic situation and the resulting reduced demand for aircraft engines. The company announced that it would close its plant for two one-week periods in October 2009 and January 2010. Salaried employees would move to a four-day work week with one week vacations for Thanksgiving and Christmas, with the aim "to protect as much of our valuable employee base as possible".

On 14 December 2010, Continental's parent Teledyne announced that Teledyne Continental Motors, Teledyne Mattituck Services, and its general aviation piston engine business would be sold to Technify Motor (USA) Ltd, a subsidiary of AVIC International, for US$186 million in cash. AVIC is a Chinese state-owned aerospace company. In May 2011, the transaction was reported as complete, and the company was renamed Continental Motors, Inc.

On 23 July 2013, the company bought diesel aircraft engine manufacturer Thielert from bankruptcy for an undisclosed sum. Thielert will become an operating division of Continental and will be renamed Technify Motors GmbH.

In 2015, Continental purchased Danbury Aerospace, which included ECi (Engine Components International) and PMA (Precision Machined Airparts). ECi had been supplying aftermarket engine parts since 1943; the merger reduced the number of third-party manufacturers of Continental engine rebuild parts. ECi's Titan engines were modern, non-certified engines competing with Lycoming's Thunderbolt. These were eventually rebranded as the Continental Titan.

In 2018, Continental Aerospace Technologies became a publicly traded company, listed on the Hong Kong Exchanges and Clearing Limited (HKEX). The listing was structured through a holding company arrangement, with Continental Motors Company serving as a principal operating subsidiary. AVIC International (HK) Group Limited (AVIC) remained a minority shareholder following the listing.

In March 2019, the company changed its name from Continental Motors, Inc. to Continental Aerospace Technologies. Later that year, the company announced a new engine in its line of piston engines, the IO-370, a drop-in replacement engine for select Cessna models.

In March 2022, Karen Hong was named as the company's president and CEO, replacing Robert Stoppek. Hong had previously served as the interim CEO and chief financial officer (CFO).

In 2026, Arcline Investment Management, an American private equity firm, announced an agreement to acquire Continental in a transaction valued at approximately $535 million. The acquisition was completed later in 2026.

In 2026, Keith Chatten was named as the company’s CEO, replacing Karen Hong.

== Products ==
=== Opposed piston engines ===
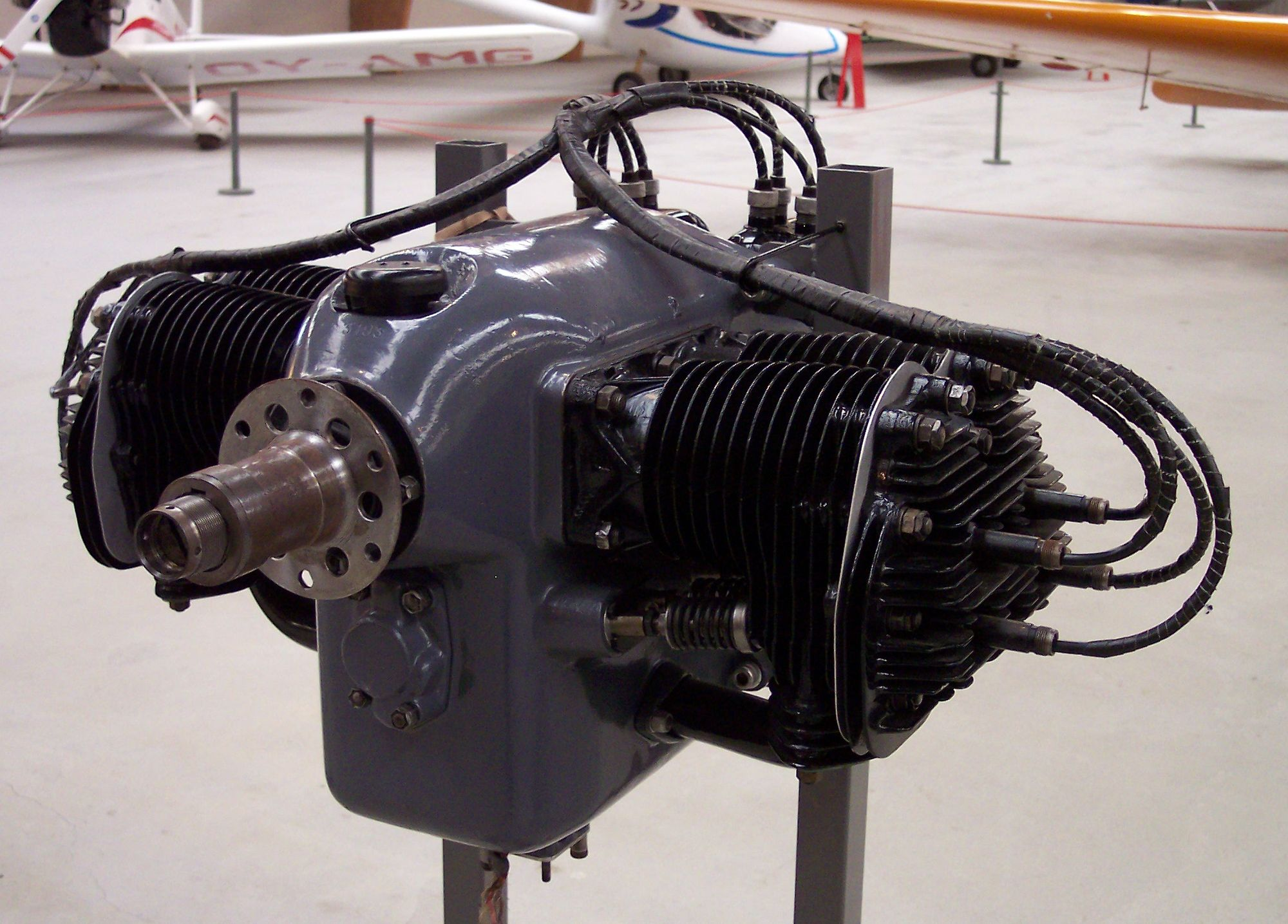
A40

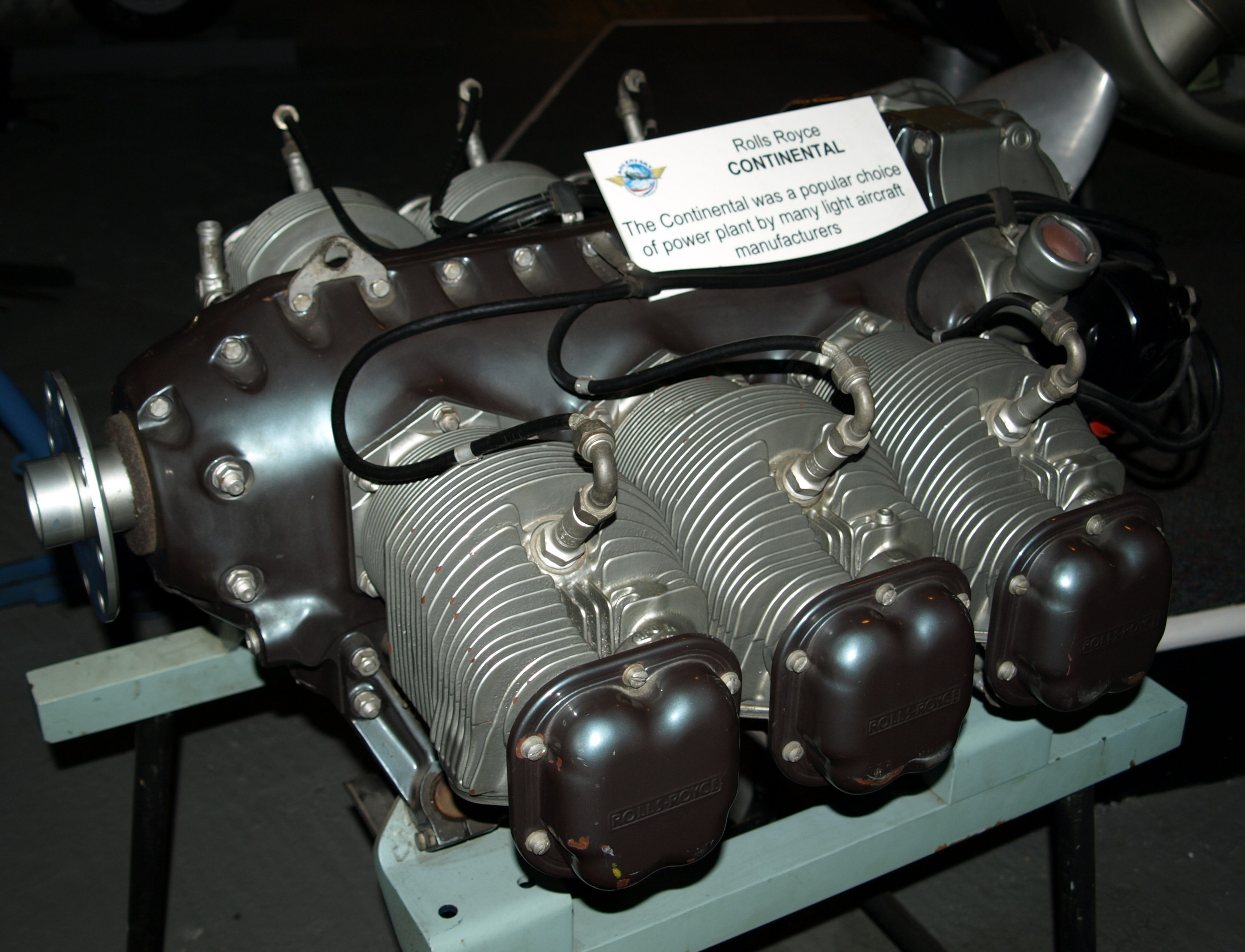
O-300

Model name	Configuration	Power
Continental A-40	O4	40 hp
Continental O-170	O4	65 hp
Continental O-190	O4	85 hp
Continental O-200	O4	100 hp
Continental O-240	O4	125 hp
Continental O-280	O6	125 hp
Continental O-300	O6	145 hp
Continental IO-346	O4	165 hp
Continental IO-360	O6	195 hp
Continental IO-370	O4	195 hp
Continental O-470	O6	213 hp
Continental O-520	O6	375 hp
Continental O-526	O6	320 hp
Continental IO-550	O6	300 hp
Continental TD-300	O4	230 hp
Continental Tiara 4	O4	180 hp
Continental Tiara 6	O6	285 hp
Continental Tiara 8	O8	380 hp

=== Radial and (Inverted-)V engines ===
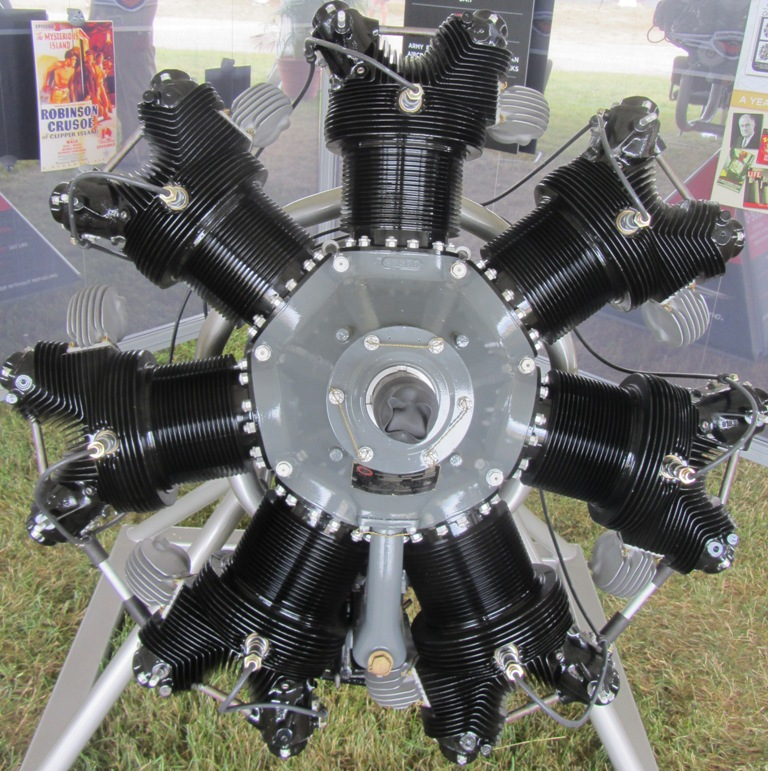
R-670

Model name	Configuration	Power
Continental A-70	R7	165 hp
Continental I-1430	IV12	1,150 hp
Continental XR-1740-2	R14	875 hp
Continental R-670	R7	225 hp
Continental R-975	R9	420 hp
Continental CD-300	V6 (Diesel/Jet 1A)	300 hp

=== Turboprop/turboshafts ===
Model name	Configuration	Power
Continental T51	Turboshaft	425 hp
Continental T65	Turboshaft	305 hp
Continental T67	Turboshaft	1,540 hp
Continental T69		
Continental T72	Turboshaft	600 hp
Continental TP-500		

=== Jet engines ===
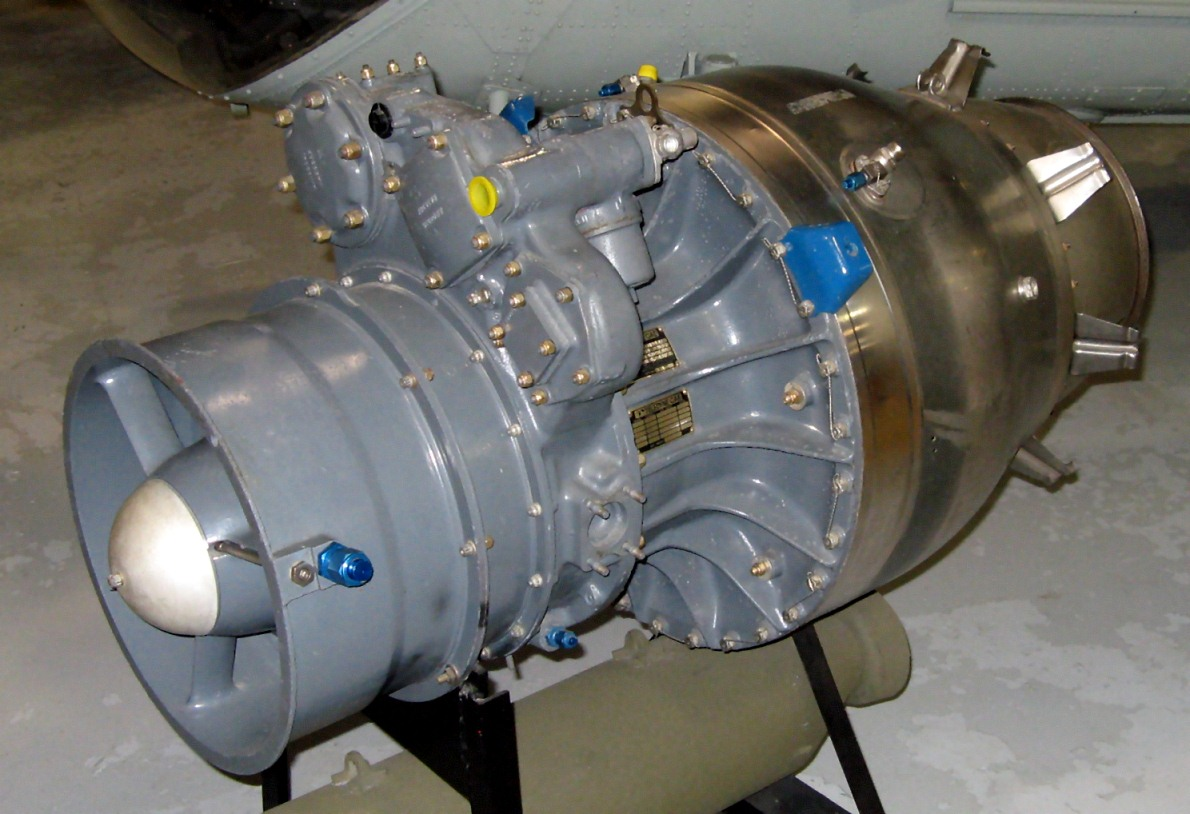
J69

Model name	Configuration	Power
Teledyne CAE J69	Turbojet	880 lbf
Continental RJ35 Ramjet		
Continental RJ45 Ramjet		
Continental RJ49 Ramjet		

== See also ==
- Lycoming Engines
- Rotax
