= Continental IO-346 =

Fuel-injected four-cylinder aircraft engine

IO-346
- Type: Piston aero-engine
- National origin: United States
- Manufacturer: Teledyne Continental Motors
- First run: 1962
- Major applications: Beechcraft Musketeer
- Manufactured: 1965-1969
- Developed into: Continental IO-520

The Continental IO-346 engine is a fuel-injected four-cylinder aircraft engine that was developed especially for the Beechcraft Musketeer Custom III by Continental Motors. It was produced for that aircraft between 1965 and 1969.

== Design and development ==
There is no carbureted version of the engine, which would have been designated O-346 and therefore the base model is the IO-346.

The IO-346 was designed to run on 91-98 avgas. The engine has a dry weight of 269.75–297 lb (122–135 kg) including the generator and starter. The ignition system consists of dual magnetos, one Scintilla S4RN-201 and one S4RN-205 or, alternatively, two Slick Electro 449 magnetos.

== Variants ==
IO-346-A
Base model, certified 27 July 1962
IO-346-B
Identical to IO-346-A except it incorporates provisions for a hydraulic propeller control. Certified 23 June 1964.

== Applications ==
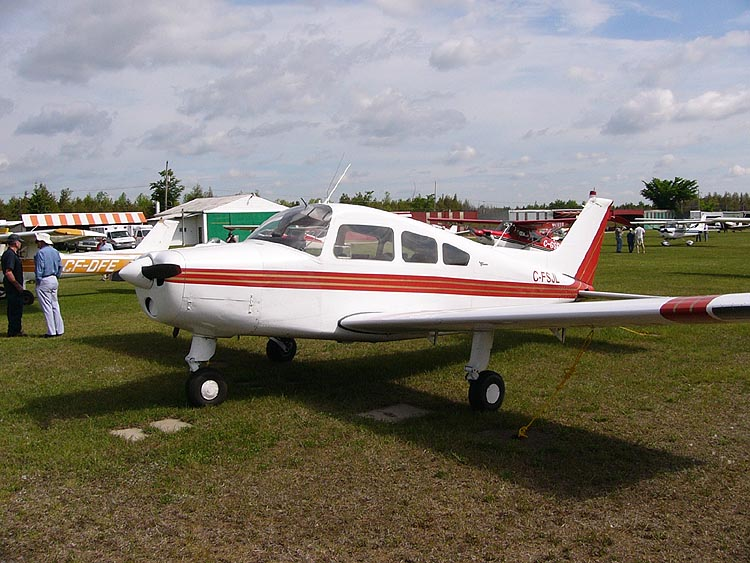
1965 model Beechcraft A23 Musketeer equipped with the IO-346 engine

- Beechcraft Musketeer
- Gadfly E.S 102
- Piel Emeraude
- Stampe SV-4D

== Specifications (IO-346) ==
Reference: Engines for Homebuilt Aircraft & Ultralights

=== General characteristics ===
- Type: 4-cylinder air-cooled horizontally opposed aircraft piston engine
- Bore: 5.25 in (133 mm)
- Stroke: 4.00 in (102 mm)
- Displacement: 346 cu in (5.7 L)
- Length: 30 in (762 mm)
- Width: 33.38 in (848 mm)
- Height: 22.4 in (569 mm)
- Dry weight: 297 lb dry, with starter and generator (135 kg)

=== Components ===
- Valvetrain: One intake and one exhaust valve per cylinder
- Fuel system: CMC fuel injection
- Fuel type: 91/98 octane avgas
- Cooling system: Air-cooled

=== Performance ===
- Power output: 165 hp (123 kW) at 2,700 rpm
- Specific power: 0.47 hp/in³ (21.2 kW/L)
- Compression ratio: 7.5:1
- Power-to-weight ratio: 0.56 hp/lb (0.90 kW/kg)

== See also ==
- List of aircraft engines
