= Continental IO-370 =

IO-370
- Type: Certified Piston aircraft engine
- National origin: United States
- Manufacturer: Continental Aerospace Technologies
- First run: 2017
- Major applications: Piper Pilot 100; Cessna 172 Retrofit
- Manufactured: 2019-

The Continental IO-370 engine is a family of fuel injected four-cylinder, horizontally opposed, air-cooled aircraft engines that were developed for use in light aircraft by Continental Aerospace Technologies. There is no carbureted version of this engine, which would have been designation O-370, therefore the base model is the IO-370.

== Variants ==
IO-370-CL
Dynafocal engine mount version. 195 hp (145 kW) at 2700 rpm, dry weight 295 lb (133.81 kg). Certified 11 October 2018.
IO-370-CM
Conical engine mount version. 195 hp (145 kW) at 2700 rpm, dry weight 295 lb (133.81 kg). Certified 11 October 2018.
IO-370-DA3A
Dynafocal engine mount version. 180 hp (134 kW) at 2700 rpm, dry weight 292.5 lb (132.68 kg). Not certified.

== Specifications (IO-370-DA3A) ==
Data from Continental Certified Engine Series

=== General characteristics ===
- Type: 4-cylinder air-cooled horizontally opposed aircraft piston engine
- Bore: 5.125 in (130.175 mm)
- Stroke: 4.5 in (114.3 mm)
- Displacement: 371 in³ (6.1 L)
- Length: 33.02 in (838.708 mm)
- Width: 33.41 in (848.614 mm)
- Height: 23.45 in (595.63 mm)
- Dry weight: 292.5 lb dry (132.67 kg)

=== Components ===
- Valvetrain: Roller Lifter
- Fuel system: CMC fuel injection
- Fuel type: 100/100LL avgas
- Cooling system: Air-cooled

=== Performance ===
- Power output: 180 hp (134.2 kW) at 2,700 rpm
- Specific power: 0.485 hp/in³ (22 kW/L)
- Compression ratio: 8.1:1
- Power-to-weight ratio: 0.615 hp/lb (1.01 kW/kg)
