= Cessna 620 =

Prototype pressurized 8 to 10 seat business airplane

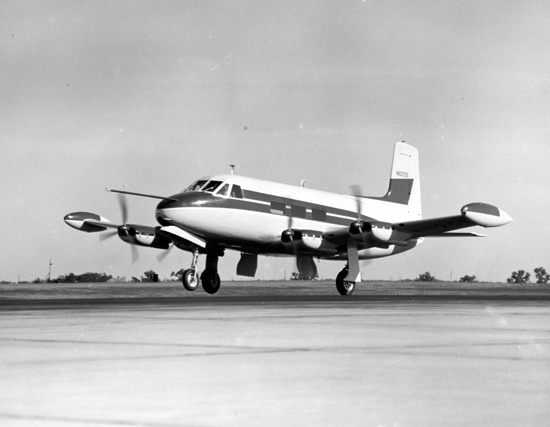

General information
- Type: Corporate aircraft
- National origin: United States
- Manufacturer: Cessna Aircraft
- Status: Project cancelled
- Number built: 1

History
- First flight: August 11, 1956

The Cessna Model 620 was a prototype American pressurized eight to 10 seat business airplane powered by four piston engines and built by Cessna. The first flight was on 11 August 1956. Only one example (c/n 620, N620E) was built.

The airplane's model number is an inside joke, as it indicates the 620 is twice the airplane that a Cessna 310 is.

== Development ==
The Cessna 620 was conceived as an executive transport with design goals that included all-weather capabilities, a pressurized and air-conditioned cabin, a multi-engine layout for safety, a reasonable price and 8 to 10 seats. The project commenced in September 1953, with first flight of the prototype, registered N620E (construction number 620) on 11 August 1956, the test pilots reporting that the aircraft had met its goals.

With the airlines set to re-equip with the then-new jet airliners, Cessna management identified that surplus propeller-driven airliners would soon flood the used aircraft market, driving prices down. A cost analysis indicated that the model 620 would be smaller and cost more than the surplus airliners and thus was not economically viable. The project was cancelled in October 1957, one aircraft having been completed. The airplane was eventually sold for scrap.

A promotional film titled Eye to the Sky was produced as a recruiting tool for new engineers. The 620 was canceled the day after it was first shown to students at Wichita State University.

== Specifications ==
Data from Phillips

General characteristics

- Crew: 2
- Capacity: 8 passengers
- Wingspan: 55 ft 0 in (16.76 m)
- Wing area: 340 sq ft (32 m^{2})
- Max takeoff weight: 13,500 lb (6,123 kg)
- Powerplant: 4 × Continental GSO-526-A air-cooled flat-six engines, 350 hp (260 kW) each

Performance

- Maximum speed: 282 mph (454 km/h, 245 kn)
- Service ceiling: 27,500 ft (8,400 m)

== See also ==
- de Havilland Heron
