= Beechcraft Musketeer =

Family of light single engine aircraft

Musketeer
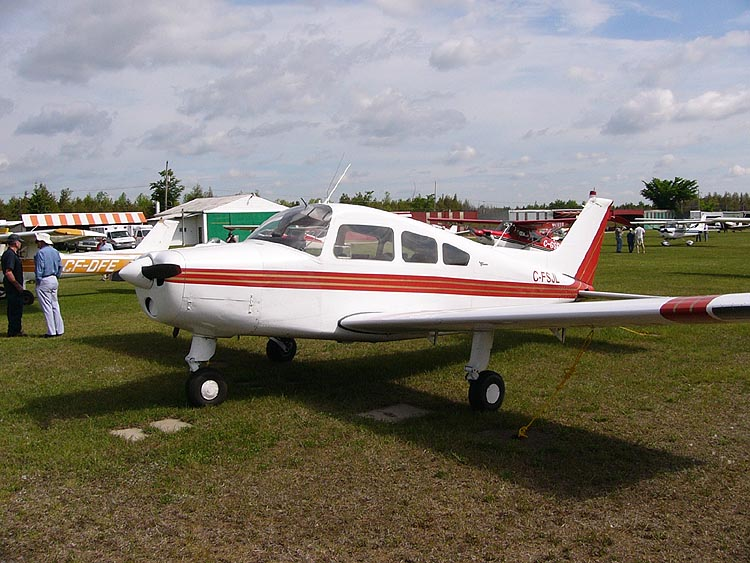
- Beechcraft A23 Musketeer

General information
- Type: Light personal and trainer aircraft
- Manufacturer: Beech Aircraft Corporation
- Number built: 4,366

History
- Manufactured: 1963–1983
- First flight: 23 October 1961
- Variant: Beechcraft CT-134 Musketeer
- Developed into: Beechcraft Duchess

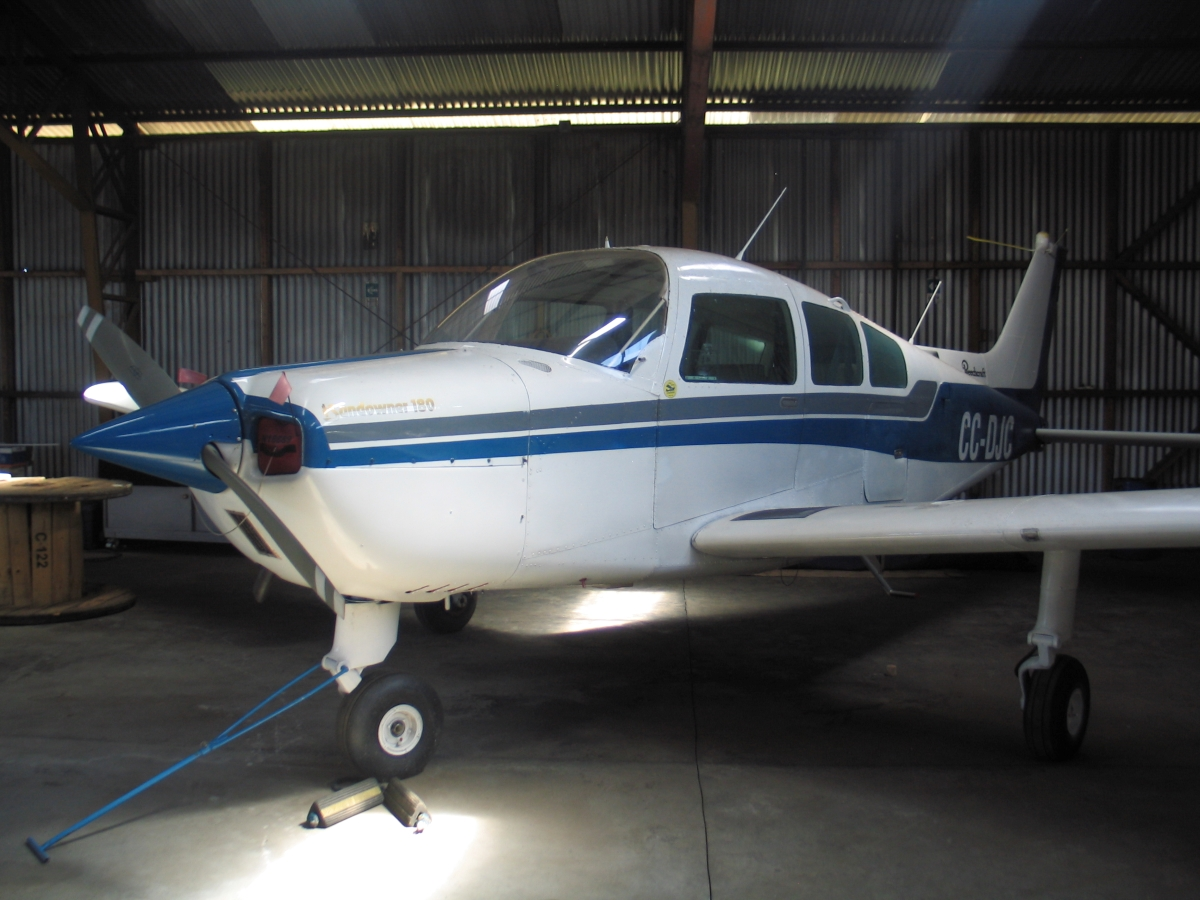
A Beechcraft 180 Sundowner

The Beechcraft Musketeer is a family of single-engined, low-wing, light aircraft that was designed and produced by Beechcraft. The line includes the Model 19 Musketeer Sport, the Model 23 Musketeer, Custom and Sundowner, the Model 23-24 Musketeer Super III, the retractable gear Model 24R Sierra and the military CT-134 Musketeer.

The Musketeer line was in production from model years 1963 to 1983, during which time a total of 4,366 were produced. The type certificate for the Musketeer family of aircraft has been owned by Hawker Beechcraft since March 26, 2007.

== Development ==
=== Origins ===
The creation of the Beechcraft Musketeer can be traced back to the early 1960s; at the start of the decade, Beech Aircraft’s entry-level aircraft was the Beechcraft Bonanza, which was a relatively expensive and high-performance aircraft introduced in the late 1940s. The company's management, being acutely aware of wider trends in the general aviation sector, recognised that a potential opportunity was present as several of its competitors, such as Cessna Aircraft and Piper Aircraft, had established product lines that intentionally encouraged intermediate pilots to purchase a successor to their first aircraft to suit their growing skill and experience. Accordingly, in 1961, Frank E. Hedrick, executive vice president, announced that the company would be broadening its commercial product line to more optimally serve to the worldwide retail sales channel. To this end, the Model 23 Musketeer was revealed as the company’s new entry-level aircraft. It was substantially cheaper to purchase than the preceding Model 35 and priced competitive against its contemporaries. The firm's market research had identified the aircraft's purchase price as being the primary barrier to entry for new pilots.

On October 23, 1961, the prototype performed its maiden flight, piloted by S.C. Tuttle. Only a handful of changes were implemented during the flight test programme; the most prominent being the substitution of the prototype's original fully-swiveling nosewheel from being positioned aft of the engine compartment more forwards to improve ground handling characteristics; nosewheel steering via the rudder pedals was also introduced. On February 20, 1962, the Federal Aviation Administration (FAA) issued type certification for the aircraft. It was introduced under the "Musketeer" name as a 1963 model (although the first deliveries took place in October 1932) at an initial price of $13,300 and was initially powered by a Lycoming O-320-D2B engine of 160 bhp (120 kW).

While sales of this initial version of the aircraft did not ultimately attain the projected 1,000 units, a total of 553 were sold before production transitioned to the improved Model A23. This version of the aircraft had been quickly developed in response to feedback gathered from pilots, flight instructors, and the distribution network, featuring several upgrades to boost its comfort, performance, and aesthetics. One of the most prominent visual changes was the addition of a third window in the cabin.

In 1964, the Lycoming engine was replaced by the Continental IO-346-A engine, capable of up to 165 bhp (123 kW). This engine was not a success and was in turn replaced by the Lycoming O-360-A4J engine, producing up to 180 bhp (130 kW) starting with the B23 Musketeer Custom of 1968. In 1970 the C23 version was introduced also under the name "Musketeer Custom". In 1972, the C23 was renamed the "Sundowner". When properly equipped, the B23 and C23 are approved for limited aerobatics.

A total of 2,331 Beechcraft 23s of all variants were manufactured by the time production was completed 20 years later in 1983.

=== Model 19 Musketeer Sport ===
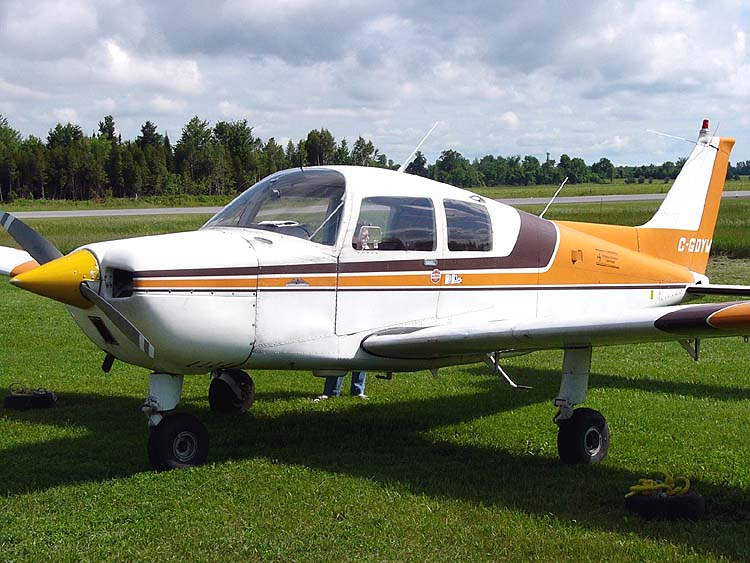
Beechcraft B19 Musketeer Sport

The Beech 19 was introduced as a 1966 model year. Despite having a lower model number, it was a later variant and was a lower-powered trainer version of the Model 23. It lacked the 23's third side window and had a Lycoming O-320-E2C powerplant of 150 bhp (110 kW). The Sport was introduced in 1966 with a standard price of $11,500. When properly equipped, the A19, B19, and M19 Sports are approved for limited aerobatics.

The Model 19 was named the "Musketeer Sport" and a total of 922 aircraft were built over the 15 years of production which ended with the 1979 model year.

=== Model 23-24 Musketeer Super III ===
Along with the introduction of the lower-powered Model 19 in 1966, Beechcraft also introduced a higher-powered version of the Model 23 Musketeer and named it the Beechcraft 23–24 Musketeer Super III. This upgraded model, first flown on 19 November 1965, had a Lycoming IO-360 fuel injected powerplant which produced 200 bhp (150 kW), 35 hp (26 kW) more than the standard Model 23 Musketeer of that year. This model initially sold for a price of $16,350 in 1966.

In 1966 a single demonstration Model 23-24 was equipped with a constant speed propeller. In succeeding years approximately one third of production aircraft were delivered with the constant speed propeller.

The Super Musketeer typically has a useful load of 1,050 to 1,080 pounds – giving it one of the highest payloads of four-cylinder, fixed gear, simple single-engined aircraft available. Most Model 23-24s were produced in a four-seat configuration. A very small number were produced with a 4+2 configuration with the baggage area convertible to seat two children. This configuration option was more common on the Sierra models that followed the Model 23-24.

One of the few weaknesses of the Model 23-24 was that it had a simple heat distribution system that provided warm air via the firewall to the area under the instrument panel only. This meant heat to the rear seat passengers was less than optimal. Later aircraft featured increasingly better ducting designs that provided heat to all four seating positions.

The fixed-gear Model 23-24 was produced only between 1966 and 1969. A total of 369 Musketeer Super IIIs were completed before it was superseded by the Model 24 Sierra. These were serial numbered MA-1 to MA-369 and were the only models to have a "MA" serial number, making them easier to distinguish than other members of the Musketeer line. In the last few airframes of the series a new instrument panel with the same "vertical tape" gauges that were used in the early Sierras was introduced. These models were known as the A24 and are not to be confused with the first Sierras, which were designated A24R models. Other than the instrument panel these aircraft were mechanically identical to the earlier A23-24 model.

=== Model 24 Sierra ===
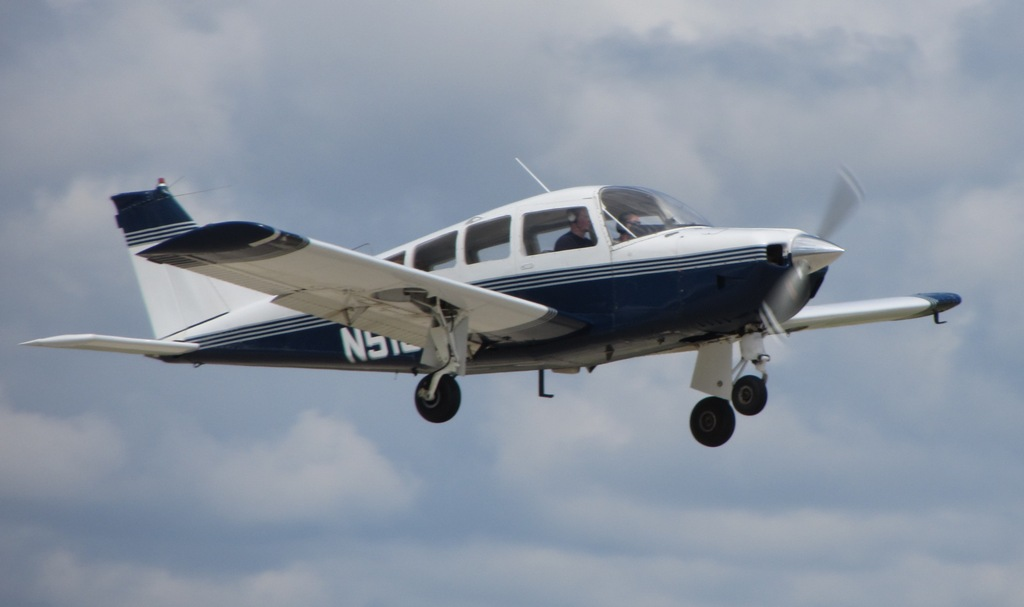
Sierra takeoff

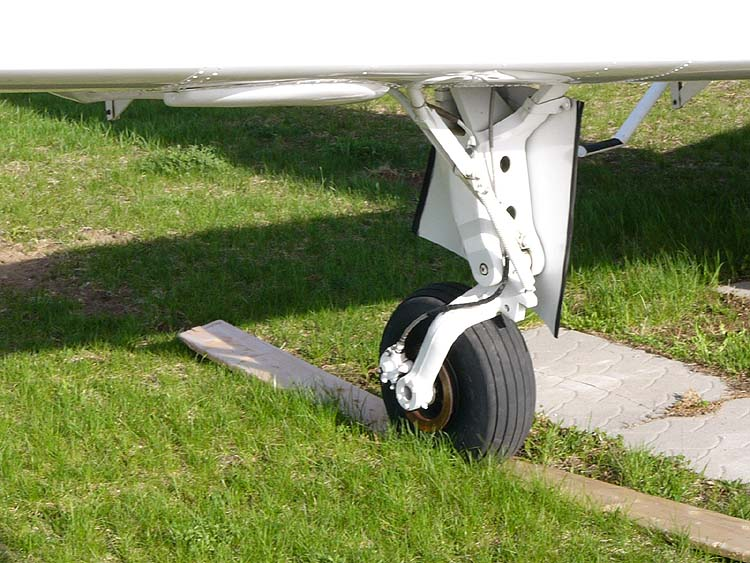
Beechcraft B24 Sierra main landing gear showing the characteristic trailing idler link landing gear

The Model 23-24 Musketeer Super III proved the utility of the 200 hp (150 kW) engine in the Musketeer airframe, but the fixed-gear configuration prevented using full advantage of the extra power of the injected Lycoming. The obvious solution was retracting the landing gear and this resulted in the Model 24R.

The Musketeer Super R, A24R in 1970 was the first model year for the new retractable version of the Musketeer to compete with the Piper Arrow.

Renamed the "Sierra", in 1972. The initial A24R Sierra was powered by a Lycoming IO-360-A1B of 200 bhp (150 kW) and sold for a standard price of $24,950. The Model 24R completed the Beech line between the fixed gear Musketeers and the much larger, faster, more complex and expensive Beechcraft Bonanza.

1974 saw the introduction of the improved B24R Sierra powered by the Lycoming IO-360-A1B6 engine and new propeller variant as a 1974 model year. The improved C24R in 1977 was powered by the same engine and larger propeller. Beech also did an aerodynamic cleanup on the "C" model making it 6 knots faster than the "B" model it replaced in 1977.

Sierra production ended at the same time as the Model 23 Sundowner assembly line was closed up, during the aviation economic downturn of 1983. A total of 744 Sierras were delivered.

The Musketeer design was further developed into a twin-engined aircraft, the Beechcraft Model 76 Duchess.

=== CT-134 Musketeer ===
The Canadian Forces purchased twenty-four 1971 model B23 Musketeers, with the first CT-134 arriving at CFB Portage la Prairie on March 23, 1971. The initial batch of CT-134s was replaced in late 1981 with twenty-four 1982 model Beechcraft C23 Sundowners, which were designated by the CF as CT-134A Musketeer II.

== Design ==
In terms of its general configuration, the Beechcraft Musketeer is a low-wing single-engined aircraft featuring all-metal construction. The airframe was fabricated using a truss-grid honeycomb approach. It was furnished with a four-place cabin along with a single door on the right side for entry and egress (a left-side door could be optionally fitted). This cabin featured a sizable windshield (as well as two windows set at either side) to provide favorable external visibility to the pilot. It was also more spacious than several directly competing aircraft of the era. The principal flight controls were actuated via tensioned steel cables. As standard, the aircraft was outfitted with compatible instrumentation for flying under instrument flight rules (IFR) and a single VHF radio.

The Musketeer's cantilever wing featured a NACA 632A415 laminar flow airfoil and a slight dihedral. Its primary structural element comprised a single spar, made of an extruded aluminum alloy. Forward of this spar, both the skin and stringers were bonded to the ribs while traditional riveting was used aft of the spar. Manually-actuated flaps were fitted; both the flaps and the slotted ailerons were corrugated. The aircraft lacked trim tabs, although the single-piece counter-balanced stabilator was provisioned with a full-span anti-servo tab.

The aircraft was outfitted with fixed tricycle landing gear, which incorporated stacks of rubber discs that functioned as shock absorbers to mitigate the impacts of takeoffs and landings. This aspect of the aircraft was a significant difference to most other light aircraft of similar role. While the competiting Cessna 172s use spring-steel main gear, the Piper PA-28 Cherokees use oleo struts and the Grumman American AA-5s use fiberglass-sprung main gear, the Musketeer family use a trailing idler link gear system. This gives the aircraft quite different landing characteristics compared to the competition; light touchdowns are often accompanied by the idler links skipping and producing a landing that is less graceful than anticipated. Nevertheless, with practice, smooth landings are relatively easy to accomplish.

As a result of this type of landing gear design, Beechcraft did not design or offer wheel fairings for the fixed gear models. Several aftermarket manufacturers have designed and tested wheel fairings for Musketeers.

== Operational history ==
During their production years the Musketeer family of aircraft were popular trainers and were used by many flying schools. Most Musketeers are now privately owned.

== Variants ==
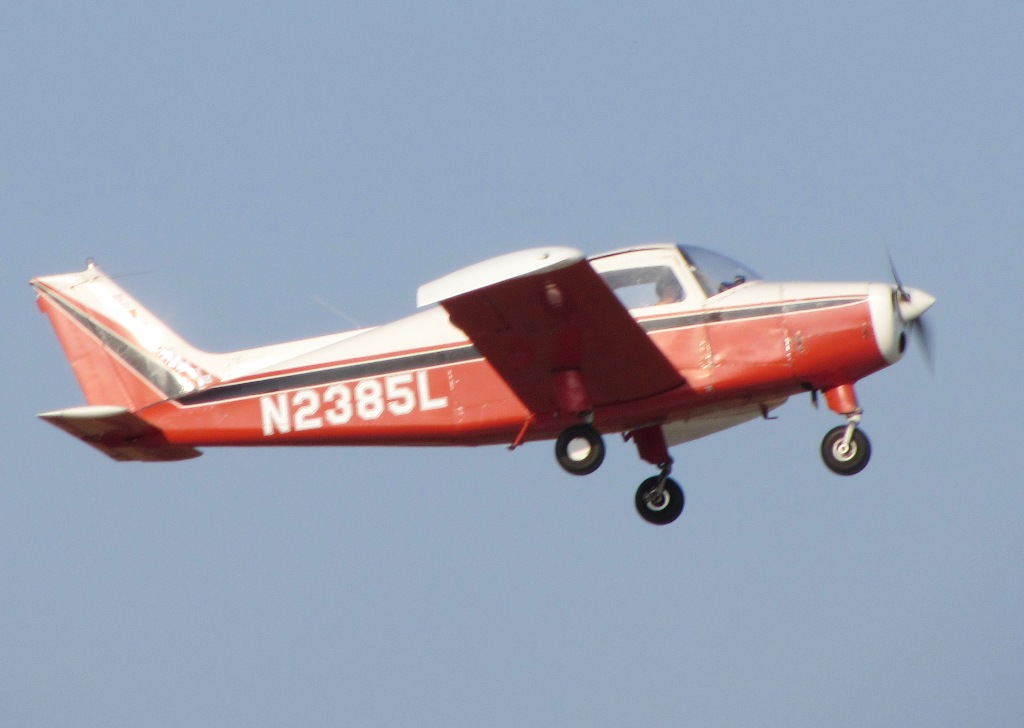
1963 Model 23

23 Musketeer
Four-seat light cabin aircraft, fixed tricycle landing gear, powered by a 160 hp (119 kW) Lycoming O-320-D2B piston engine, gross weight of 2,300 lb (1,043 kg), first certified February 20, 1962.
A23 Musketeer II
Four-seat light cabin aircraft, fixed tricycle landing gear, powered by a 165 hp (123 kW) Continental IO-346-A piston engine, gross weight of 2,350 lb (1,066 kg), first certified June 7, 1963.
A23A
Four-seat light cabin aircraft, fixed tricycle landing gear, powered by a 165 hp (123 kW) Continental IO-346-A piston engine, gross weight of 2,400 lb (1,089 kg), first certified November 5, 1965.

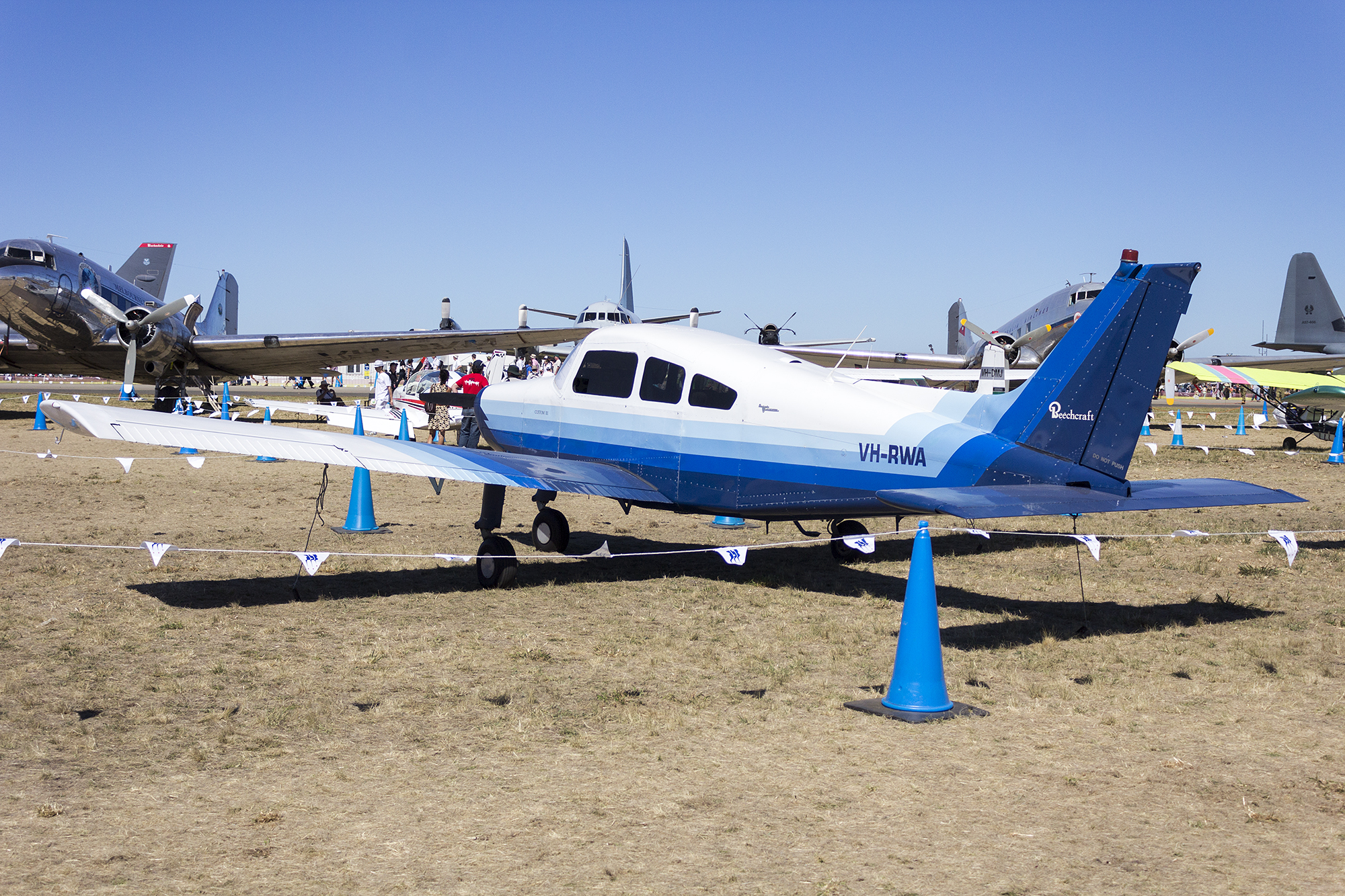
1967 model A23A Musketeer

A23-19 (Model 19)
Two or four-seat light cabin aircraft, fixed tricycle landing gear, powered by a 150 hp (112 kW) Lycoming O-320-E2B, E2C or E3D piston engine, gross weight of 2,200 lb (998 kg), first certified December 9, 1965.
A23-24
Four or six-seat light cabin aircraft, fixed tricycle landing gear, powered by a 200 hp (149 kW) Lycoming IO-360-A2B or A2D, or when equipped with a constant speed propeller a Lycoming IO-360-A1B or A1D piston engine, gross weight of 2,550 lb (1,157 kg), first certified March 7, 1966.
A24
Four or six-seat light cabin aircraft, fixed tricycle landing gear, powered by a 200 hp (149 kW) Lycoming IO-360-A2B or A2D, or when equipped with a constant speed propeller a Lycoming IO-360-A1B or A1D piston engine, gross weight of 2,550 lb (1,157 kg), first certified February 5, 1970.
19A
Two or four-seat light cabin aircraft, fixed tricycle landing gear, powered by a 150 hp (112 kW) Lycoming O-320-E2B, E2C or E3D piston engine, gross weight of 2,250 lb (1,021 kg), first certified August 31, 1967, approved in the aerobatic category March 12, 1968.
M19A
Two-seat light cabin aircraft, fixed tricycle landing gear, powered by a 150 hp (112 kW) Lycoming O-320-E2B, E2C or E3D piston engine, gross weight of 2,250 lb (1,021 kg), first certified December 9, 1969, including in the aerobatic category.
B19
Two or four-seat light cabin aircraft, fixed tricycle landing gear, powered by a 150 hp (112 kW) Lycoming O-320-E2B, E2C or E3D piston engine, gross weight of 2,250 lb (1,021 kg), first certified February 13, 1970, including in the aerobatic category.
B23
Four-seat light cabin aircraft, fixed tricycle landing gear, powered by a 180 hp (134 kW) Lycoming O-360-A2G piston engine, gross weight of 2,450 lb (1,111 kg), first certified December 13, 1967 and in the aerobatic category November 22, 1968.

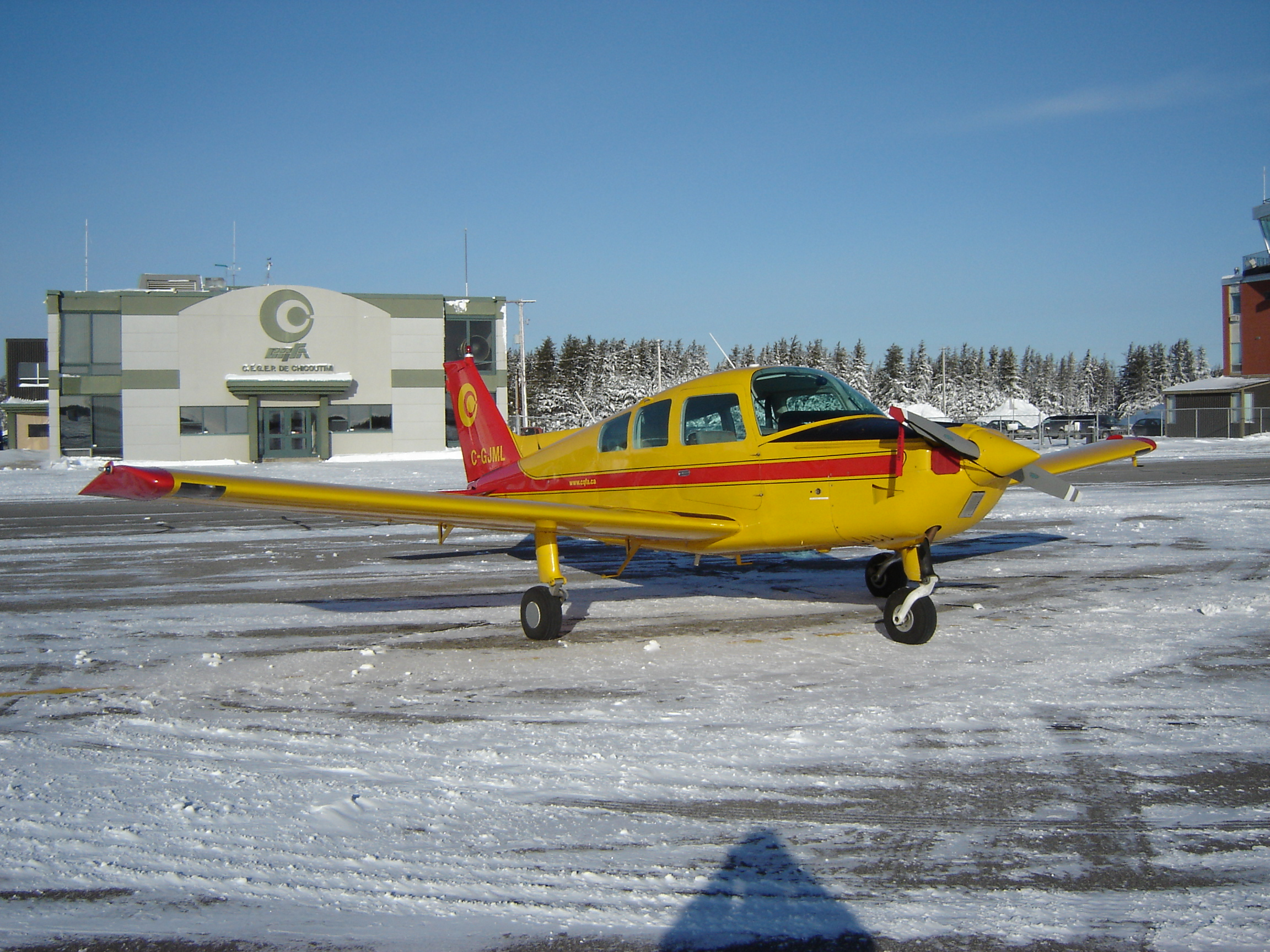
1980 model Beechcraft C23 Sundowner

C23
Four-seat light cabin aircraft, fixed tricycle landing gear, powered by a 180 hp (134 kW) Lycoming O-360-A4G, A2G, A4J or A4K piston engine, gross weight of 2,450 lb (1,111 kg), first certified February 13, 1970 including in the aerobatic category.
A24R Sierra 200
Four or six-seat light cabin aircraft, retractable tricycle landing gear, powered by a 200 hp (149 kW) Lycoming IO-360-A1B or A1D piston engine, gross weight of 2,750 lb (1,247 kg), first certified December 23, 1969.
B24R Sierra 200
Four or six-seat light cabin aircraft, retractable tricycle landing gear, powered by a 200 hp (149 kW) Lycoming IO-360-A1B6 piston engine and new propeller variant, gross weight of 2,750 lb (1,247 kg), first certified June 18, 1973 sold as a 1974 model also had a new larger rear baggage door.
C24R Sierra 200
Four or six-seat light cabin aircraft, retractable tricycle landing gear, powered by a 200 hp (149 kW) Lycoming IO-360-A1B6 piston engine, gross weight of 2,750 lb (1,247 kg), first certified October 1, 1976 with a new larger prop and aerodynamic cleanup by Beech made it 6 knots faster than the "B" .

== Operators ==
=== Military operators ===
Algeria

- Algerian Air Force (4 x B24R Sierra); no longer in service

Canada

- Canadian Armed Forces (24 x B23 and 24 x C23 Sundowners, designated as CT-134) until 1992 when they were replaced by Slingsby T67 Firefly

Hong Kong

- Royal Hong Kong Auxiliary Air Force (2 x B23-19); retired in 1993 with disbanding of RHKAAF with GFS ordering Slingsby T67 Firefly

Mexico

- Mexican Air Force (20 x A23-19); all retired

Morocco

- Royal Moroccan Air Force (1 x 23); no longer in active service

== Accidents and incidents ==
- January 8, 2000: American musician Joe Dan Petty, former guitar technician for The Allman Brothers Band and former member of the band Grinderswitch, is one of two people killed when a Beechcraft Model 23 Musketeer loses engine power just after takeoff from Macon, Georgia, strikes trees, and bursts into flame.

== Specifications (A23A Musketeer Custom III) ==
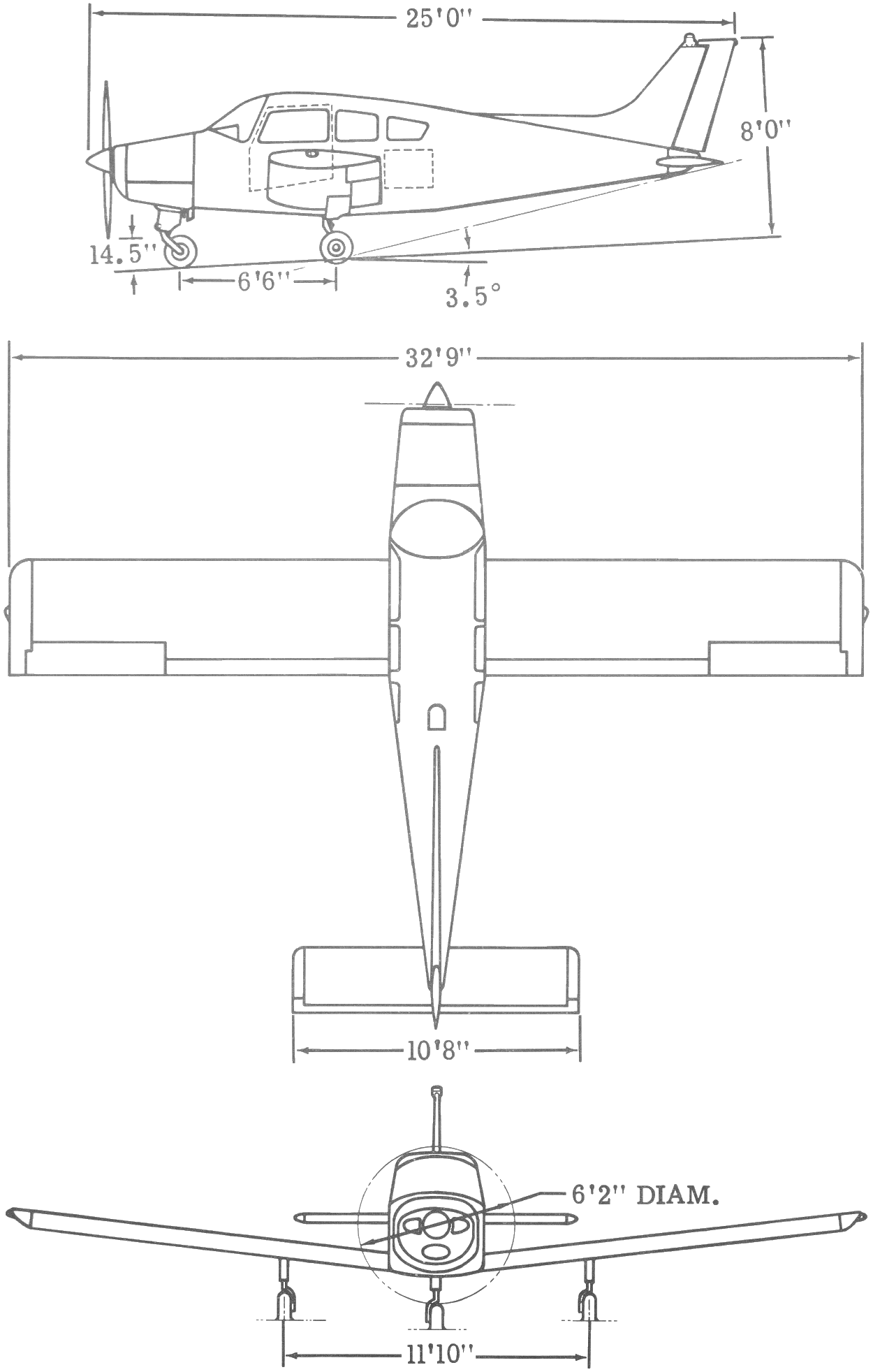
3-view line drawing of the Beechcraft A23A Musketeer Custom III

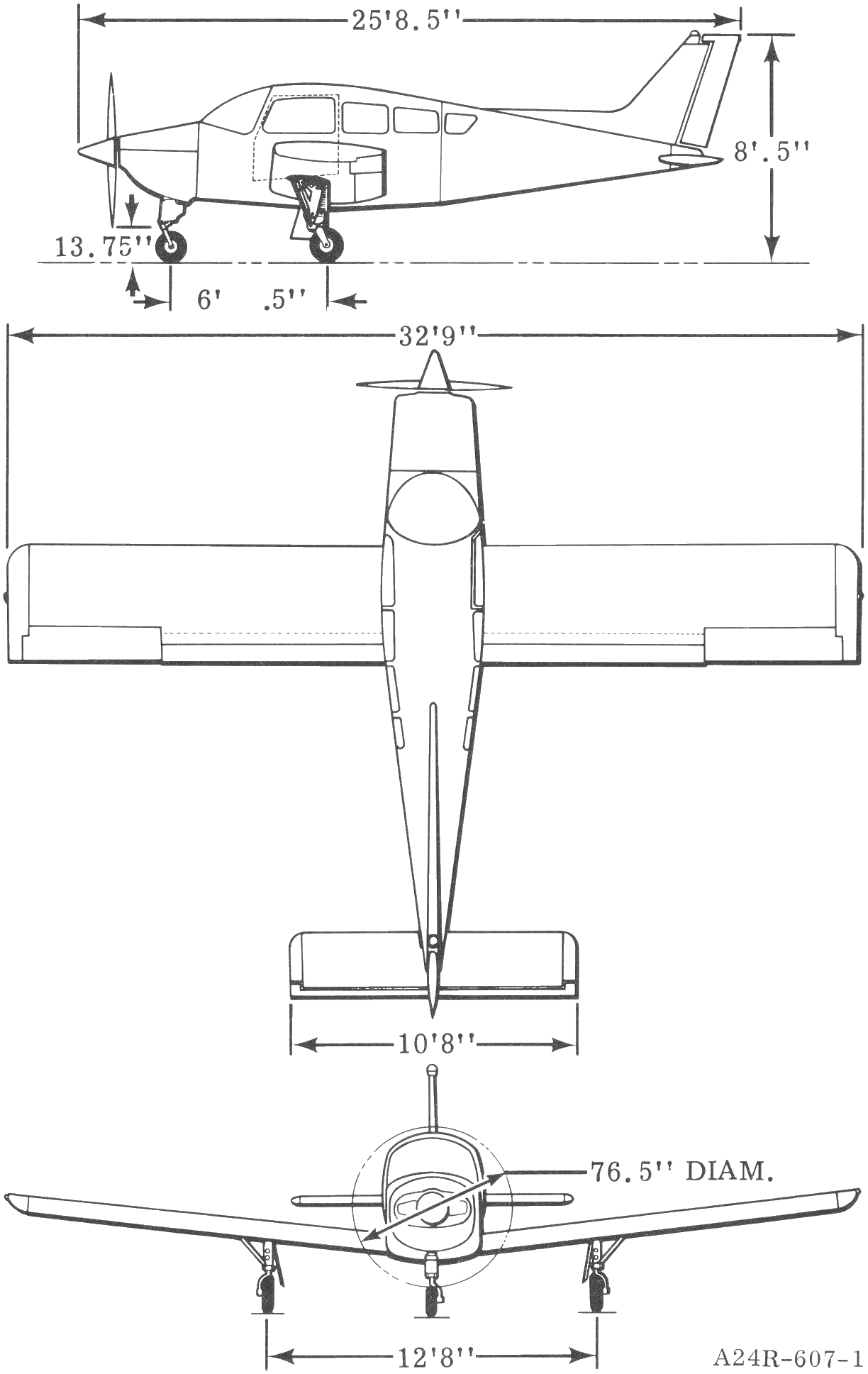
3-view line drawing of the Beechcraft A24R Musketeer Super R

Data from Flying,Airliners.net The Incomplete Guide to Airfoil Usage

General characteristics

- Crew: one
- Capacity: three passengers
- Length: 25 ft 8 in (7.82 m)
- Wingspan: 32 ft 9 in (9.98 m)
- Height: 8 ft 3 in (2.51 m)
- Wing area: 146 sq ft (13.6 m^{2})
- Airfoil: NACA 63A415
- Empty weight: 1,375 lb (624 kg)
- Gross weight: 2,400 lb (1,089 kg)
- Powerplant: 1 × Continental IO-346-A four cylinder air-cooled horizontally opposed aircraft piston engine, 165 hp (123 kW)
- Propellers: 2-bladed fixed pitch

Performance

- Maximum speed: 127 kn (146 mph, 235 km/h)
- Cruise speed: 102 kn (117 mph, 189 km/h) long range cruise speed
- Stall speed: 63 kn (72 mph, 117 km/h)
- Never exceed speed: 152 kn (175 mph, 282 km/h)
- Range: 676 nmi (778 mi, 1,252 km) with reserves
- Service ceiling: 13,000 ft (4,000 m)
- Rate of climb: 728 ft/min (3.70 m/s)

== See also ==
Related development

- Beechcraft CT-134 Musketeer
- Beechcraft Duchess

Aircraft of comparable role, configuration, and era

- Cessna 172
- Cessna 177 Cardinal
- Grumman American AA-5
- Piper PA-28 Cherokee
