= Helicopter =

Type of rotorcraft

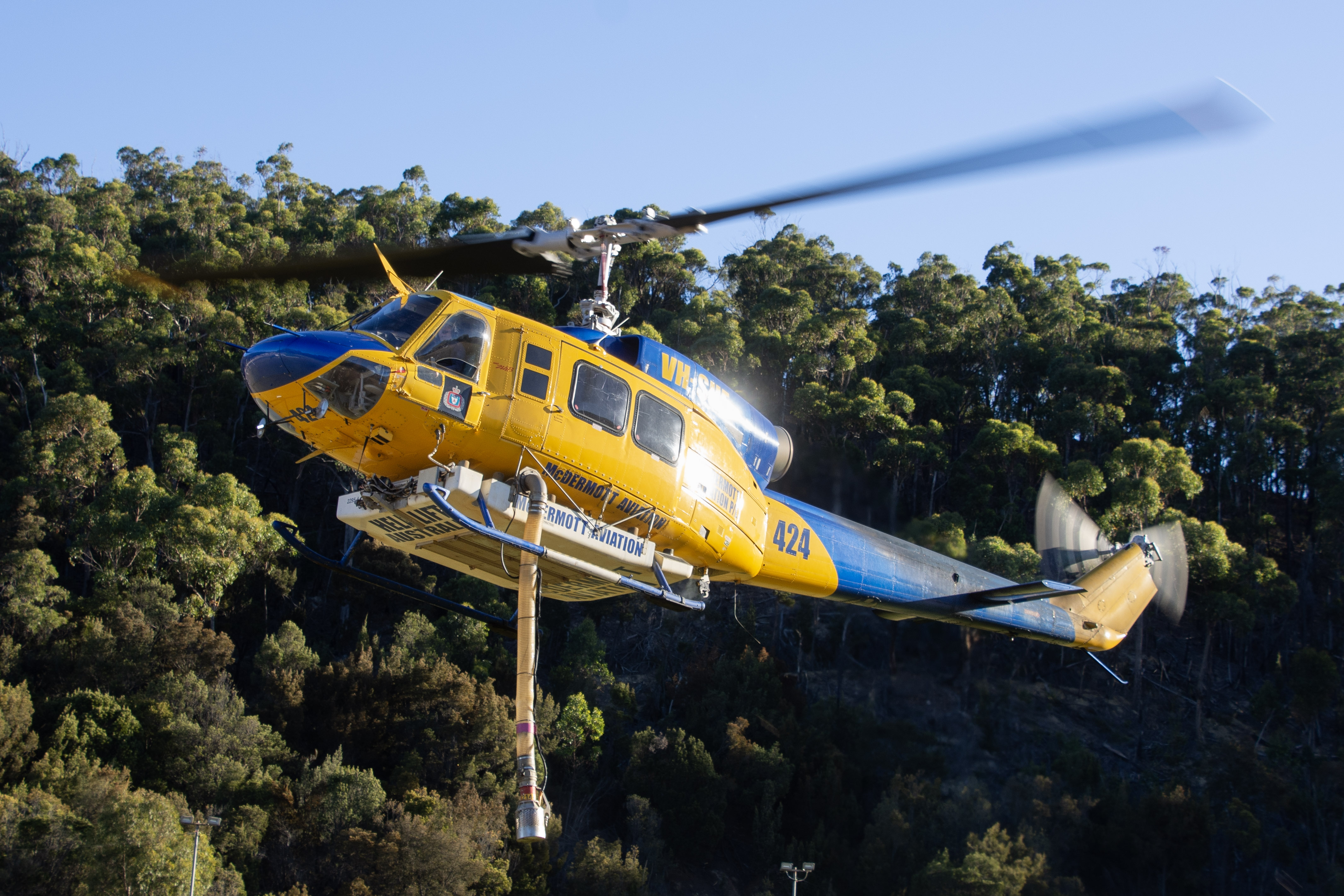
VH-SUF, a McDermott Aviation Bell 214 taking off after refuelling.

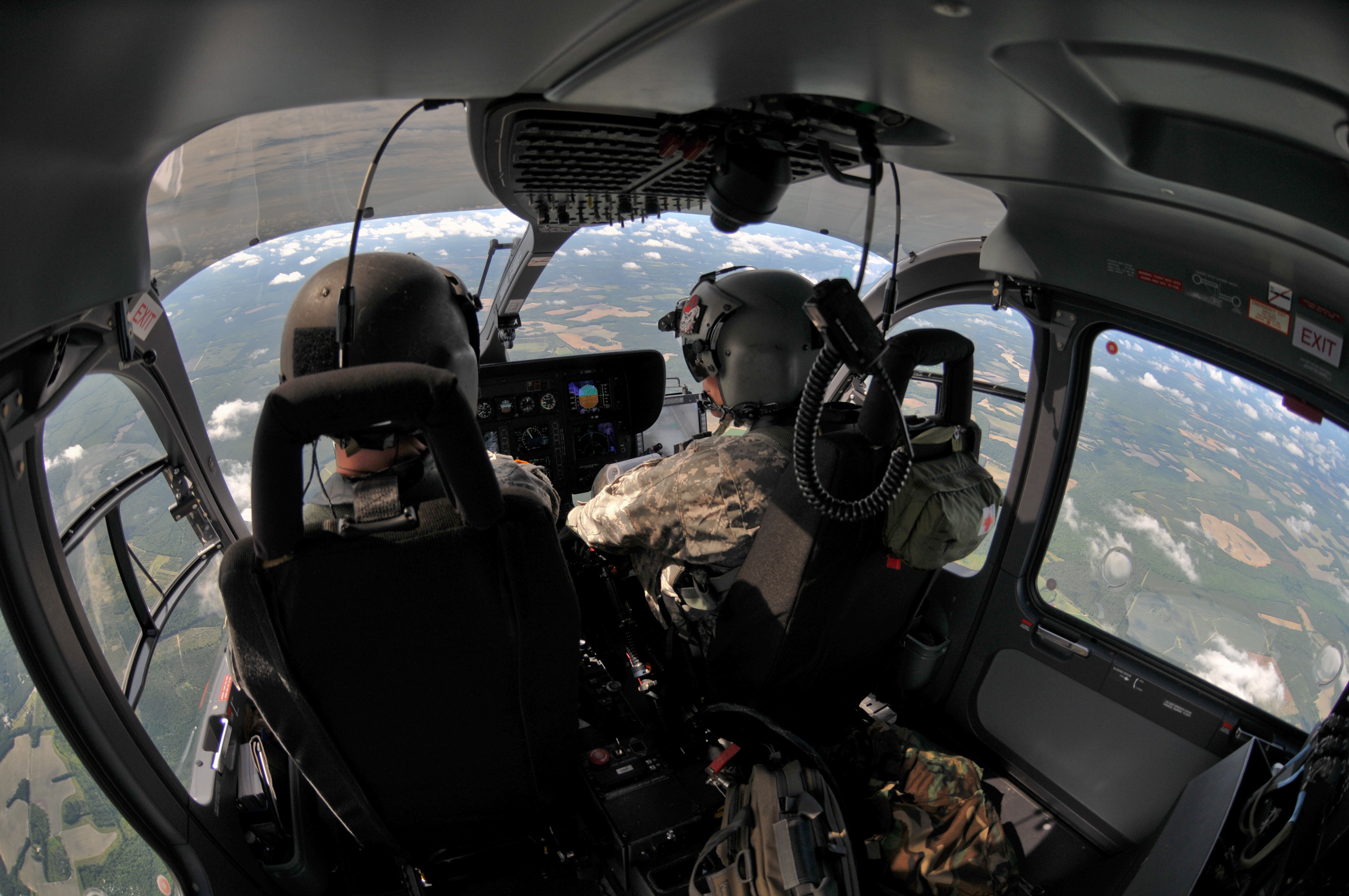
Cabin view looking out from a helicopter in flight

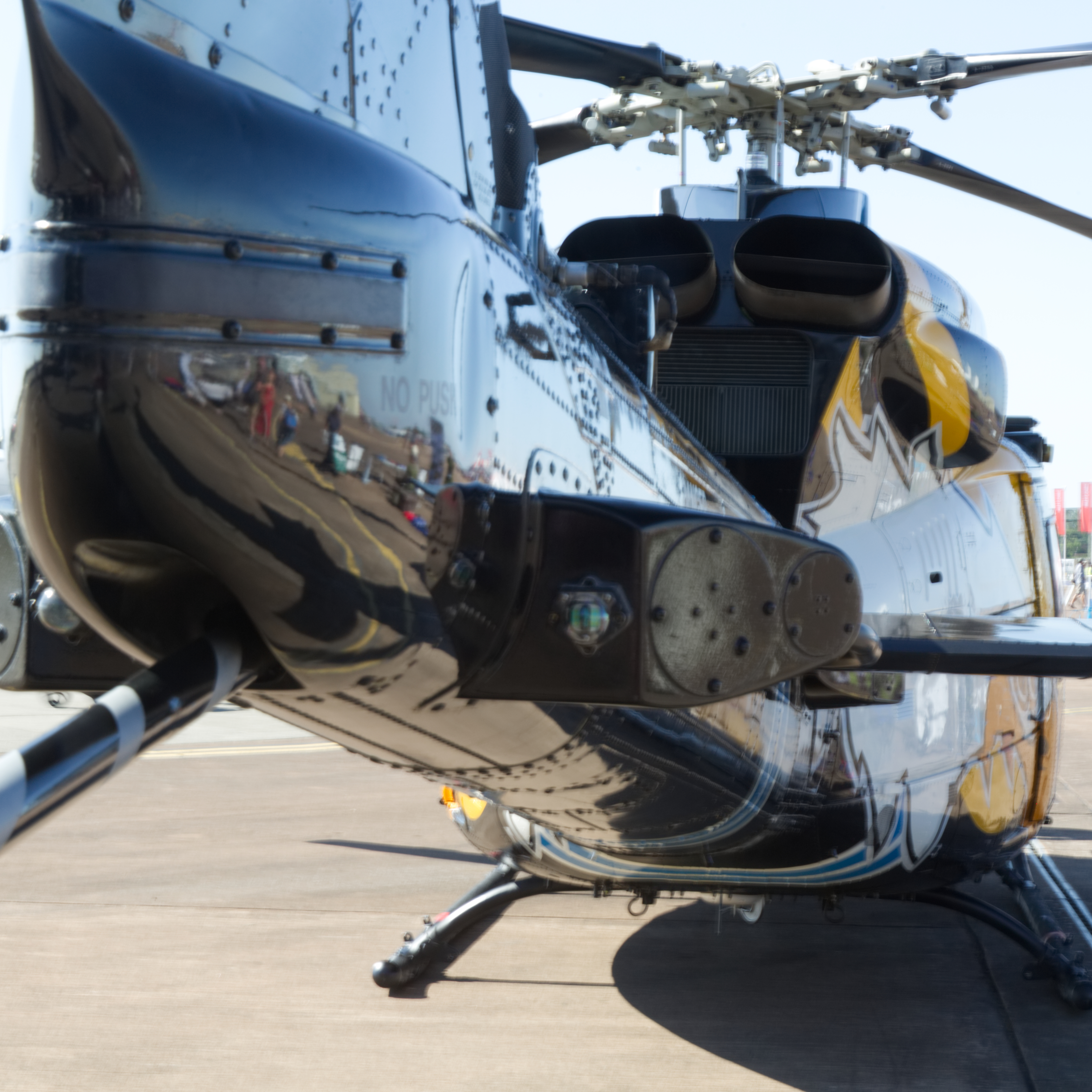
Bell 412CF looking forward from the tail, showing its twin turbine engine exhausts

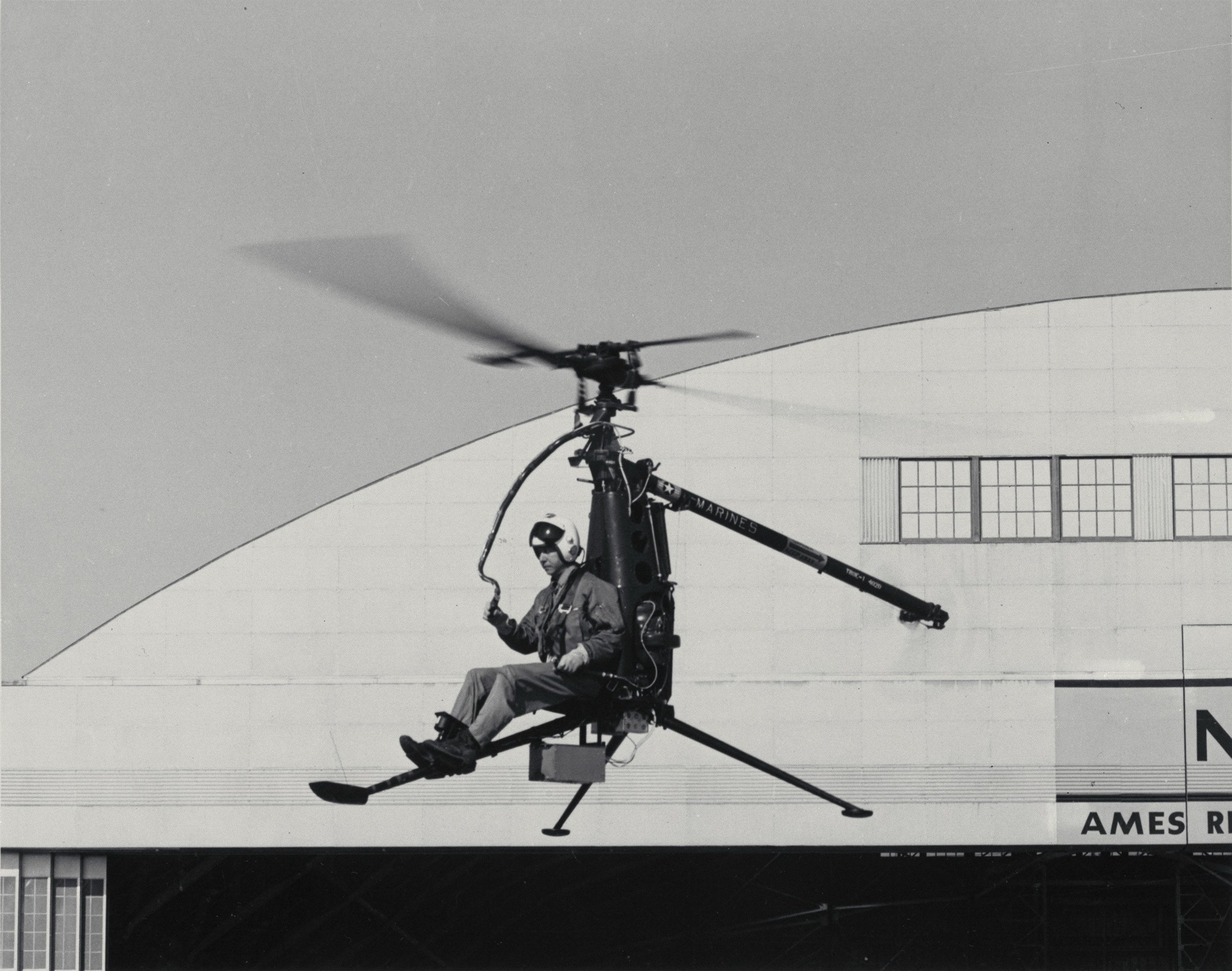
1956 Hiller YROE-1 one-man "Rotorcycle" being tested at NASA Ames Research Center

A helicopter is a type of rotorcraft in which lift and thrust are supplied by horizontally spinning rotors. This allows the helicopter to take off and land vertically, to hover, and to fly forward, backward and laterally. These attributes allow helicopters to be used in congested or isolated areas where fixed-wing aircraft and many forms of short take-off and landing (STOL) or short take-off and vertical landing (STOVL) aircraft cannot perform without a runway.

The Focke-Wulf Fw 61 was the first successful, practical, and fully controllable helicopter in 1936, while in 1942, the Sikorsky R-4 became the first helicopter to reach full-scale production. Starting in 1939 and through 1943, Igor Sikorsky worked on the development of the VS-300, which over four iterations, became the basis for modern helicopters with a single main rotor and a single tail rotor.

Although most earlier designs used more than one main rotor, the configuration of a single main rotor accompanied by a vertical anti-torque tail rotor (i.e. unicopter, not to be confused with the single-blade monocopter) has become the most common helicopter configuration. However, twin-rotor helicopters (bicopters), in either tandem or transverse rotors configurations, are sometimes in use due to their greater payload capacity than the monorotor design, and coaxial-rotor, tiltrotor and compound helicopters are also all flying today. Four-rotor helicopters (quadcopters) were pioneered as early as 1907 in France, and along with other types of multicopters, have been developed mainly for specialized applications such as commercial unmanned aerial vehicles (drones) due to the rapid expansion of drone racing and aerial photography markets in the early 21st century, as well as recently weaponized utilities such as artillery spotting, aerial bombing and kamikaze drones.

== Etymology ==
The English word helicopter is adapted from the French word hélicoptère, coined by Gustave Ponton d'Amécourt in 1861, which is composed of the Ancient Greek roots helix (ἕλιξ, genitive helikos (ἕλῐκος), "helix, spiral, whirl, convolution"), and pteron (πτερόν, "wing").

The word is often (erroneously, from an etymological point of view) rebracketed by English speakers as consisting of heli- and -copter, leading to words like helipad and quadcopter. English language nicknames for "helicopter" include "chopper", "copter", "heli", and "whirlybird". In the United States military, a common military slang term used is "helo" (pronounced /ˈhiː.loʊ/).

== Design ==
Main and anti-torque rotors

A helicopter is a type of rotorcraft in which lift and thrust are supplied by one or more horizontally-spinning rotors. By contrast the autogyro (or gyroplane) and gyrodyne have a free-spinning rotor for all or part of the flight envelope, relying on a separate thrust system to propel the craft forwards, so that the airflow sets the rotor spinning to provide lift. The compound helicopter also has a separate thrust system, but continues to supply power to the rotor throughout normal flight. U.S. federal regulations state that "helicopter" means a rotorcraft that, for its horizontal motion, depends principally on its engine-driven rotors.

=== Rotor system ===
The rotor system, or more simply rotor, is the rotating part of a helicopter that generates lift. A rotor system may be mounted horizontally, as main rotors are, providing lift vertically, or it may be mounted vertically, such as a tail rotor, to provide horizontal thrust to counteract torque from the main rotors. The rotor consists of a mast, hub and rotor blades.

The mast is a cylindrical metal shaft that extends upwards from the transmission. At the top of the mast is the attachment point for the rotor blades called the hub. Main rotor systems are classified according to how the rotor blades are attached and move relative to the hub. There are three basic types: hingeless, fully articulated, and teetering; although some modern rotor systems use a combination of these.

=== Anti-torque ===
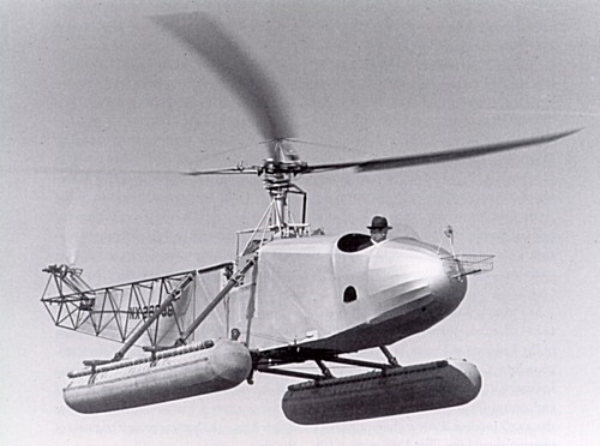
Sikorsky's V-300, 1937

Most helicopters have a single main rotor, but torque created by its aerodynamic drag must be countered by an opposed torque. The design that Igor Sikorsky settled on for his VS-300 was a smaller tail rotor. The tail rotor pushes or pulls against the tail to counter the torque effect, and this has become the most common configuration for helicopter design, usually at the end of a tail boom.

Some helicopters use other anti-torque controls instead of the tail rotor, such as the ducted fan (called Fenestron or FANTAIL) and NOTAR. NOTAR provides anti-torque similar to the way a wing develops lift through the use of the Coandă effect on the tail boom.

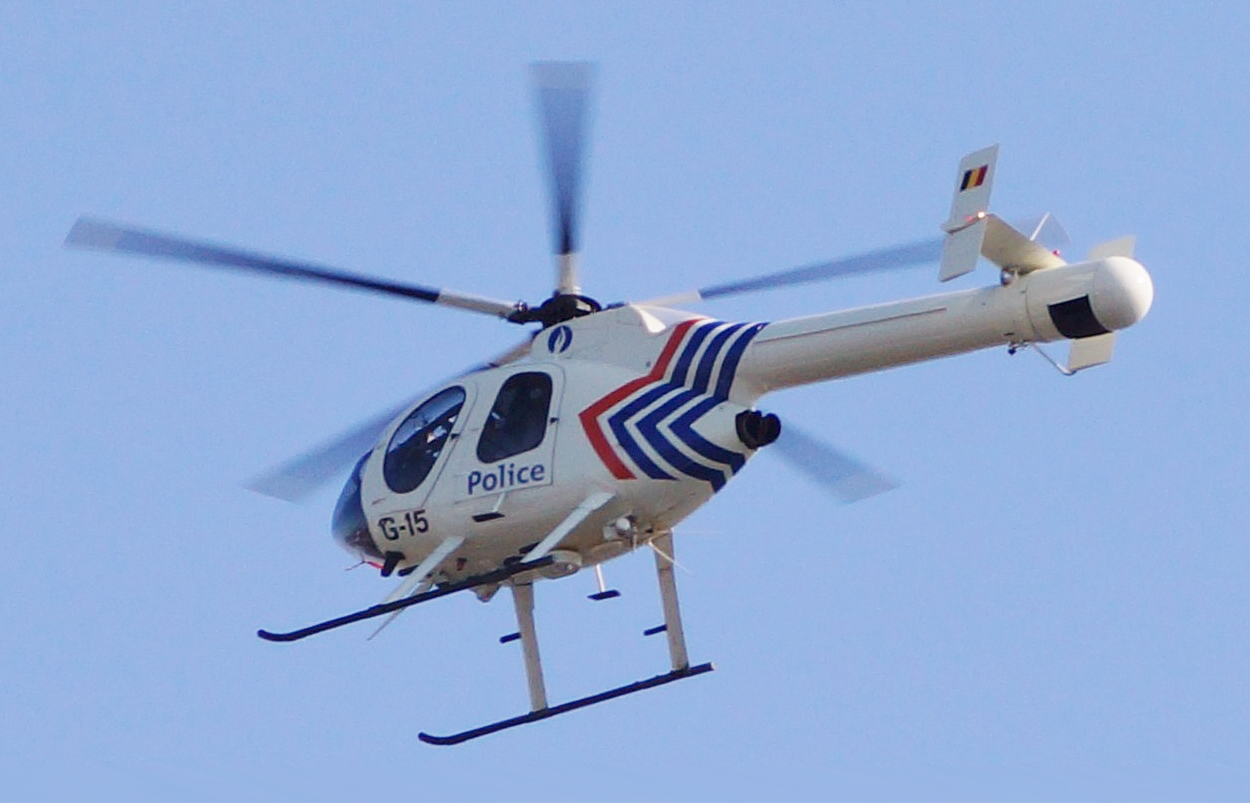
MD 520N NOTAR

The use of two or more horizontal rotors turning in opposite directions is another configuration used to counteract the effects of torque on the aircraft without relying on an anti-torque tail rotor. This allows the power normally required to be diverted for the tail rotor to be applied fully to the main rotors, increasing the aircraft's power efficiency and lifting capacity. There are several common configurations that use the counter-rotating effect to benefit the rotorcraft:

- Tandem rotors are two counter-rotating rotors with one mounted behind the other.
- Transverse rotors are pair of counter-rotating rotors transversely mounted at the ends of fixed wings or outrigger structures. Now used on tiltrotors, some early model helicopters had used them.
- Coaxial rotors are two counter-rotating rotors mounted one above the other with the same axis.
- Intermeshing rotors are two counter-rotating rotors mounted close to each other at a sufficient angle to let the rotors intermesh over the top of the aircraft without colliding. An aircraft utilizing this is known as a synchropter.
- Multirotors make use of three or more rotors. Specific terms are also used depending on the exact amount of rotors, such as tricopter, quadcopter, hexacopter and octocopter for three rotors, four rotors, six rotors and eight rotors respectively, of which quadcopter is the most common. Multirotors are primarily used on drones and use on aircraft with a human pilot is rare.

Tip jet designs let the rotor push itself through the air and avoid generating torque.

=== Engines ===
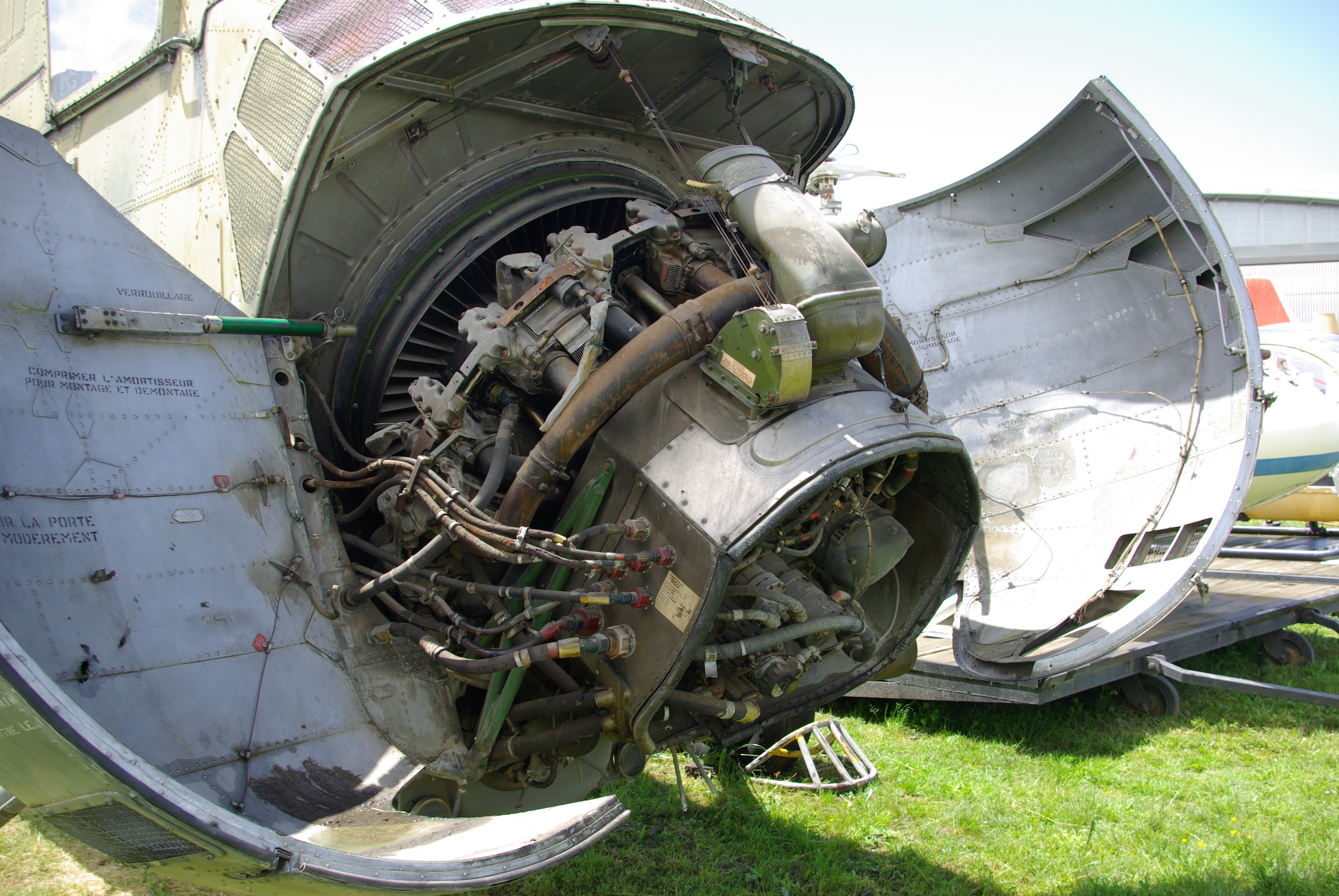
H-34 with a radial piston engine in the nose

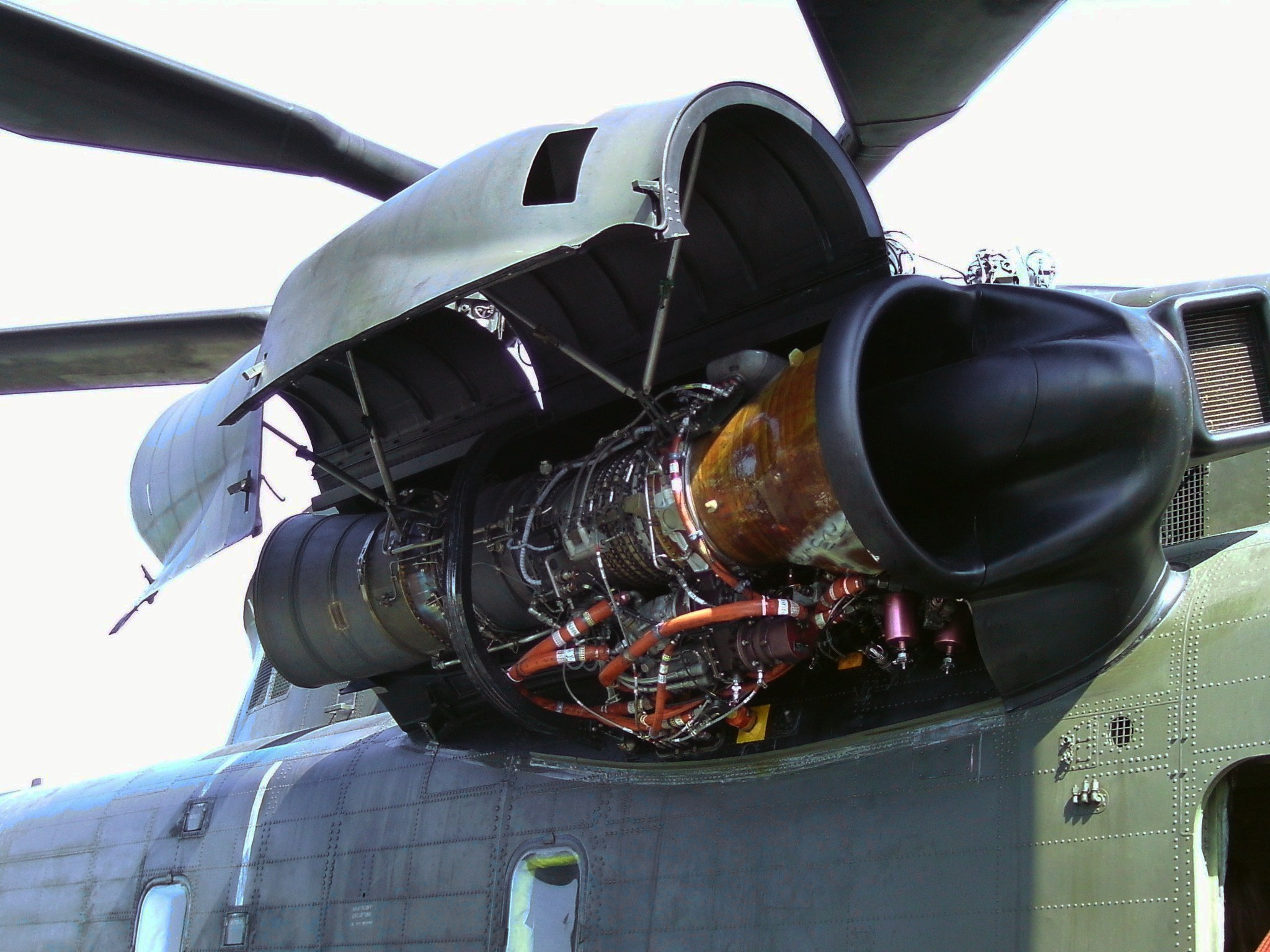
Turbine engine of a CH-53 Sea Stallion

The number, size and type of engine(s) used on a helicopter determines the size, function and capability of that helicopter design. The earliest helicopter engines were simple mechanical devices, such as rubber bands or spindles, which relegated the size of helicopters to toys and small models. For a half century before the first airplane flight, steam engines were used to forward the development of the understanding of helicopter aerodynamics, but the limited power did not allow for manned flight. The introduction of the internal combustion engine at the end of the 19th century became the watershed for helicopter development as engines began to be developed and produced that were powerful enough to allow for helicopters able to lift humans.

Early helicopter designs utilized custom-built engines or rotary engines designed for airplanes, but these were soon replaced by more powerful automobile engines and radial engines. The single, most-limiting factor of helicopter development during the first half of the 20th century was that the amount of power produced by an engine was not able to overcome the engine's weight in vertical flight. This was overcome in early successful helicopters by using the smallest engines available. When the compact, flat engine was developed, the helicopter industry found a lighter-weight powerplant easily adapted to small helicopters, although radial engines continued to be used for larger helicopters.

Turbine engines revolutionized the aviation industry; and the turboshaft engine for helicopter use, pioneered in December 1951 by the aforementioned Kaman K-225, finally gave helicopters an engine with a large amount of power and a low weight penalty. Turboshafts are also more reliable than piston engines, especially when producing the sustained high levels of power required by a helicopter. The turboshaft engine was able to be scaled to the size of the helicopter being designed, so that all but the lightest of helicopter models are powered by turbine engines today.

Special jet engines developed to drive the rotor from the rotor tips are referred to as tip jets. Tip jets powered by a remote compressor are referred to as cold tip jets, while those powered by combustion exhaust are referred to as hot tip jets. An example of a cold jet helicopter is the Sud-Ouest Djinn, and an example of the hot tip jet helicopter is the YH-32 Hornet.

Some radio-controlled helicopters and smaller, helicopter-type unmanned aerial vehicles, use electric motors or motorcycle engines. Radio-controlled helicopters may also have piston engines that use fuels other than gasoline, such as nitromethane. Some turbine engines commonly used in helicopters can also use biodiesel instead of jet fuel.

There are also human-powered helicopters.

=== Transmission ===
The transmission is a mechanical system that transmits power from the engine(s) to the rotors. The transmission is a system of gears, bearings, clutches and shafts that performs several functions (1) Translates the alignment of the drive shaft to match the alignment of the rotor shafts; (2) Reduces the RPM of the drive shaft to the lower RPMs of the rotors; and (3) Enables the engine to engage or disengage from the rotors. For helicopters with tail rotors, the transmission drivetrain forks into two paths: one leading to the main rotor, and one leading to the tail rotor.

The drive shafts of helicopter engines are typically not aligned with the rotor shafts, so the transmission must translate the alignment of the drive shaft to match the shafts of the rotors. Many engine drive shafts are aligned horizontally, yet the main rotor shaft ("mast") is usually vertical, and the tail rotor shaft is often perpendicular to the engine's drive shaft. The transmission contains a series of gears, usually bevel gears, that translate the alignment of the drive shaft to the alignment of the rotor shafts.

The transmission also reduces the RPMs of the engine to the lower RPMs required by the rotors. The output drive shaft of the engine, before any gearing is applied, is typically between 3,000 and 50,000 RPM (turbine engines typically have higher RPM than piston engines). The main rotor typically rotates between 300 and 600 RPM. The tail rotor, if present, usually rotates between 1,000 and 5,000 RPM. (The RPMs of a given model of helicopter are usually fixed — the RPM ranges listed above represent a variety of helicopter models). The transmission contains a series of reduction gears to reduce the engine RPM to the rotor RPMs. Several types of reduction gears may be used, including bevel gears, planetary gears, helical gears, and spur gears. Most transmissions contain several reduction gears: the engine itself may contain reduction gears (often spur gears) between the engine's internal shaft and the output drive shaft; the main rotor may have a reduction gear at its base (typically a planetary gear); and there may be reduction gears at the tail rotor, and on the shaft leading to the tail rotor.

The transmission often includes one or more clutches, which permit the rotors to engage or disengage from the engine. A clutch is required so the engine can start up and gain speed before taking the load of the rotors. A clutch is also required in the case of engine failure: in that situation, the rotors must disengage from the engine so that the rotors can continue spinning and perform autorotation. Helicopter clutches are usually freewheel clutches relying on centrifugal forces (sprag clutchs are commonly used), but belt drive clutches are also used.

=== Flight controls ===
Controls from a Bell 206

A helicopter has four flight control inputs. These are the cyclic, the collective, the anti-torque foot pedals, and the throttle.

The cyclic control is usually located between the pilot's legs and is commonly called the cyclic stick or just cyclic or stick and moves forwards and backwards and side to side. On most helicopters, the cyclic is similar to a joystick. However, the Robinson R22, Robinson R44 and Robinson R66 have a unique teetering-bar cyclic control system and a few helicopters have a cyclic control that descends into the cockpit from overhead.

The cyclic is called the cyclic because it cyclically changes the pitch of the main rotor blades. In a forward flight state, as the blades rotate, the blade rotating forward will see higher speed and a corresponding increase in lift compared to the retreating blade. As such, the angle of attack of the forward rotating blade has to be lower than the retreating blade or the helicopter will roll to the retreating blade side. This happens cyclically as the blades rotate through a complete rotation leading to the naming of this control as the cyclic. The cyclic controls this differential angle.

The cyclic controls the tilt of the rotor. In hover, the cyclic controls motion of the helicopter over the ground. In flight, the cyclic controls the pitch and roll of the helicopter.

In a hover, if the pilot pushes the cyclic forward, the rotor disk tilts forward, and the rotor produces a thrust in the forward direction. If the pilot pushes the cyclic to the side, the rotor disk tilts to that side and produces thrust in that direction, causing the helicopter to move sideways.

Because of precession, the cyclic moves the swashplate 90 degrees before the desired main rotor tilt. This can be seen when the rotor is stopped. With the blades aligned fore/aft, moving the cyclic forward does not change the blade angle but moving the cyclic to the side will change the blade angle.

In flight, the cyclic acts like the stick in an airplane. Moving the cyclic forward pitches the nose down for more speed. Moving the cyclic aft lifts the nose to slow the aircraft. Moving the cyclic to the side rolls the helicopter in that direction which generally leads to turning in that direction, assuming coordinated flight.

The collective pitch control or collective is located on the left side of the pilot's seat with an adjustable friction control to prevent inadvertent movement freeing the pilot's left hand for other uses. The collective changes the pitch angle of all the main rotor blades collectively (i.e. all at the same time) and independently of their rotational position. Therefore, if an up collective input is made, all the blades increase angle of attack equally, and the result is additional lift (power) to the main rotor system which can increase helicopter speed or altitude. Lowering the collective results in less lift from the main rotor system.

A swashplate controls the collective and cyclic pitch of the main blades. The swashplate moves up and down, along the main shaft, to change the pitch of the blades. The stick is connected to the swash plate through the collective and cyclic systems allowing both systems to independently control the angle of the blades.

The anti-torque pedals are located in the same position as the rudder pedals in a fixed-wing aircraft, and serve a similar purpose, namely to control the yaw or direction in which the nose of the aircraft is pointed. Application of the pedal in a given direction changes the pitch of the tail rotor blades, increasing or reducing the thrust produced by the tail rotor and causing the nose to yaw in the direction of the applied pedal. The pedals mechanically change the pitch of the tail rotor altering the amount of thrust produced. Helicopters do not exhibit adverse yaw as seen in airplanes and the pedals are not generally required when turning in forward flight. Use of the pedals is closely related to the collective in hover. For example, increasing collective increases aerodynamic drag on the main rotor system causing a yaw of the helicopter. The pedals are used to counter that yaw.

Both the cyclic and collective can have a wide variety of toggles and switches available to the pilot to control such things as aerodynamic trim, engine speed trim, radio and intercom, hook release, water release, etc. This allows the pilot to control these functions without removing their hands from the controls.

Helicopter rotors are designed to operate in a narrow range of RPM. The throttle controls the power produced by the engine, which is connected to the rotor by a fixed ratio transmission. The purpose of the throttle is to maintain enough engine power to keep the rotor RPM within allowable limits so that the rotor produces enough lift for flight. The throttle control is a motorcycle-style twist grip mounted on the collective control.

=== Compound helicopter ===
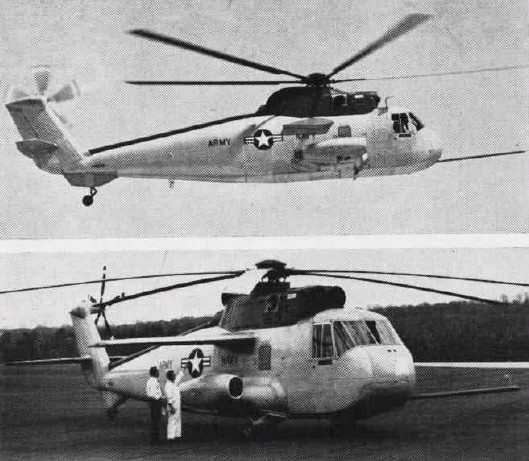
The NH-3A was experimental version of the Sea King with wings and jets.

A compound helicopter has an additional system for thrust and, typically, small stub fixed wings. This offloads the rotor in cruise, which allows its rotation to be slowed down, thus increasing the maximum speed of the aircraft. The Lockheed AH-56A Cheyenne diverted up to 90% of its engine power to a pusher propeller during forward flight.

== Flight ==
There are three basic flight conditions for a helicopter: hover, forward flight and the transition between the two.

=== Hover ===
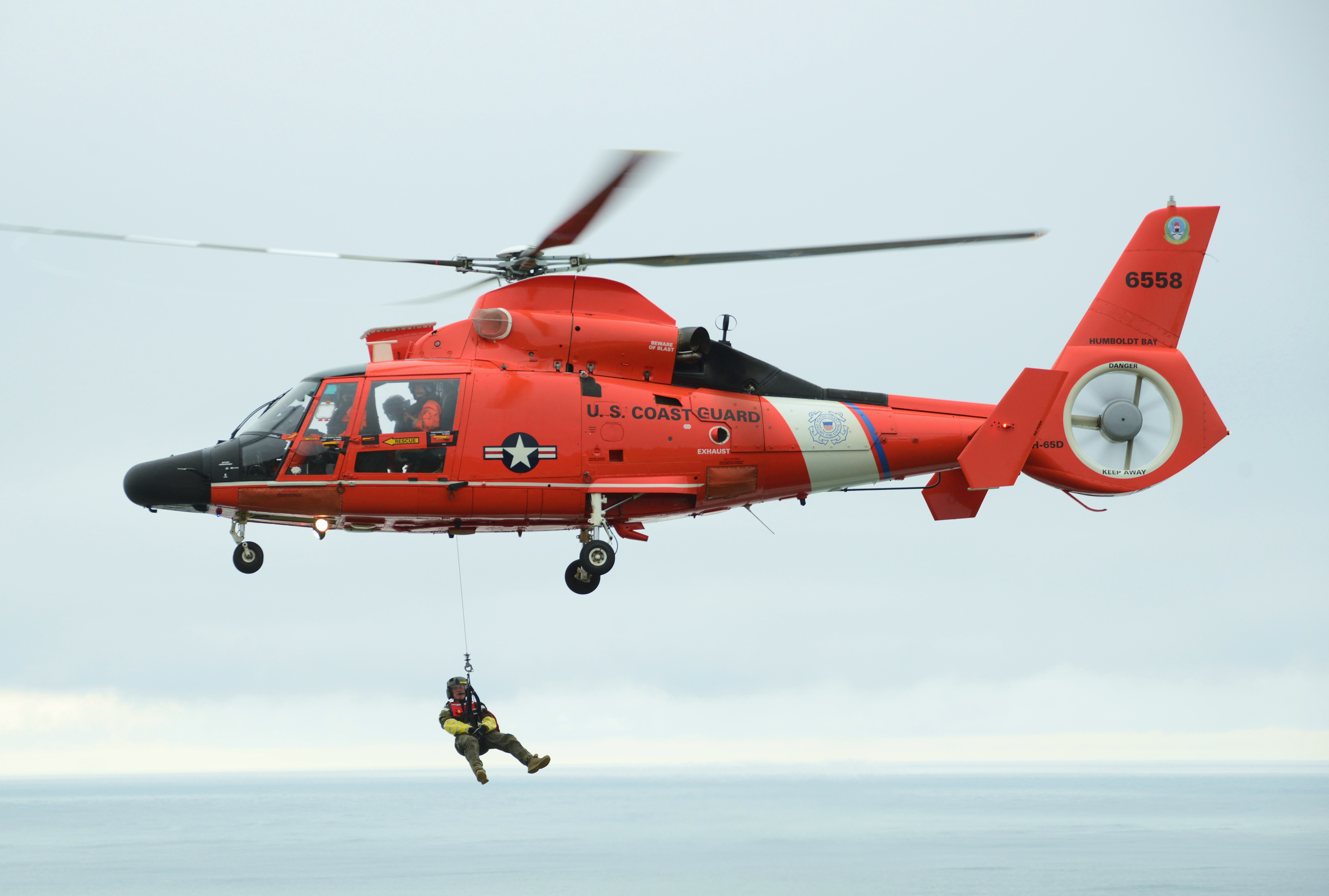
An HH-65 Dolphin holding a hover while conducting rescue hoist training

Hovering is the most challenging part of flying a helicopter. Required are constant control inputs and corrections by the pilot to keep the helicopter where it is required to be. Despite the complexity of the task, the control inputs in a hover are simple. The cyclic is used to eliminate drift in the horizontal plane, that is to control forward and back, right and left. The collective is used to maintain altitude. The pedals are used to control nose direction or heading. It is the interaction of these controls that makes hovering so difficult, since an adjustment in any one control requires an adjustment of the other two, creating a cycle of constant correction. In addition, the center of lift of the main rotor system is significantly above the center of gravity (CG) of the helicopter. Thus, any lateral perturbation of the helicopter in a hover will tend to increase as the rotor lift will increasingly roll or pitch the helicopter in a positive-feedback rotor-lift versus helicopter CG situation. The lateral motion of the helicopter lags behind the roll induced by the rotor lift side vector which will lead an inexperienced pilot into a pilot induced oscillation (PIO) and eventual loss of control.

=== Transition from hover to forward flight ===
A hovering helicopter is surrounded by a vortex of air pushing the helicopter down. This can be a hover in ground effect or out of ground effect. Thus, when in a hover, the engine needs to provide enough power to both counter helicopter weight as well as counter this downward flow of air into the rotor system. As a helicopter moves from hover to forward flight it flies out of this downward flowing vortex and enters a state called translational lift which provides extra lift without increasing power. This state, most typically, occurs when the airspeed reaches approximately 16–24 knots (30–44 km/h; 18–28 mph), and may be necessary for a helicopter to obtain flight. A maneuver called a running take off involves sliding the helicopter on the ground at increasing speed until sufficient lift is achieved for flight.

=== Forward flight ===
In forward flight a helicopter's flight controls behave more like those of a fixed-wing aircraft. Applying forward pressure on the cyclic will cause the nose to pitch down, with a resultant increase in airspeed and loss of altitude. Aft cyclic will cause the nose to pitch up, slowing the helicopter and causing it to climb. Increasing collective (power) while maintaining a constant airspeed will induce a climb while decreasing collective will cause a descent. Coordinating these two inputs, down collective plus aft cyclic or up collective plus forward cyclic, will result in airspeed changes while maintaining a constant altitude. Helicopters do not exhibit adverse yaw and the pedals are not generally needed for forward flight, even when turning.

=== Autorotation ===
If the engine fails or is disconnected from the rotor system, the helicopter will enter an autorotation, where the helicopter's main rotor turns due to air moving up through the rotor, instead of engine power driving the rotor.

== Uses ==
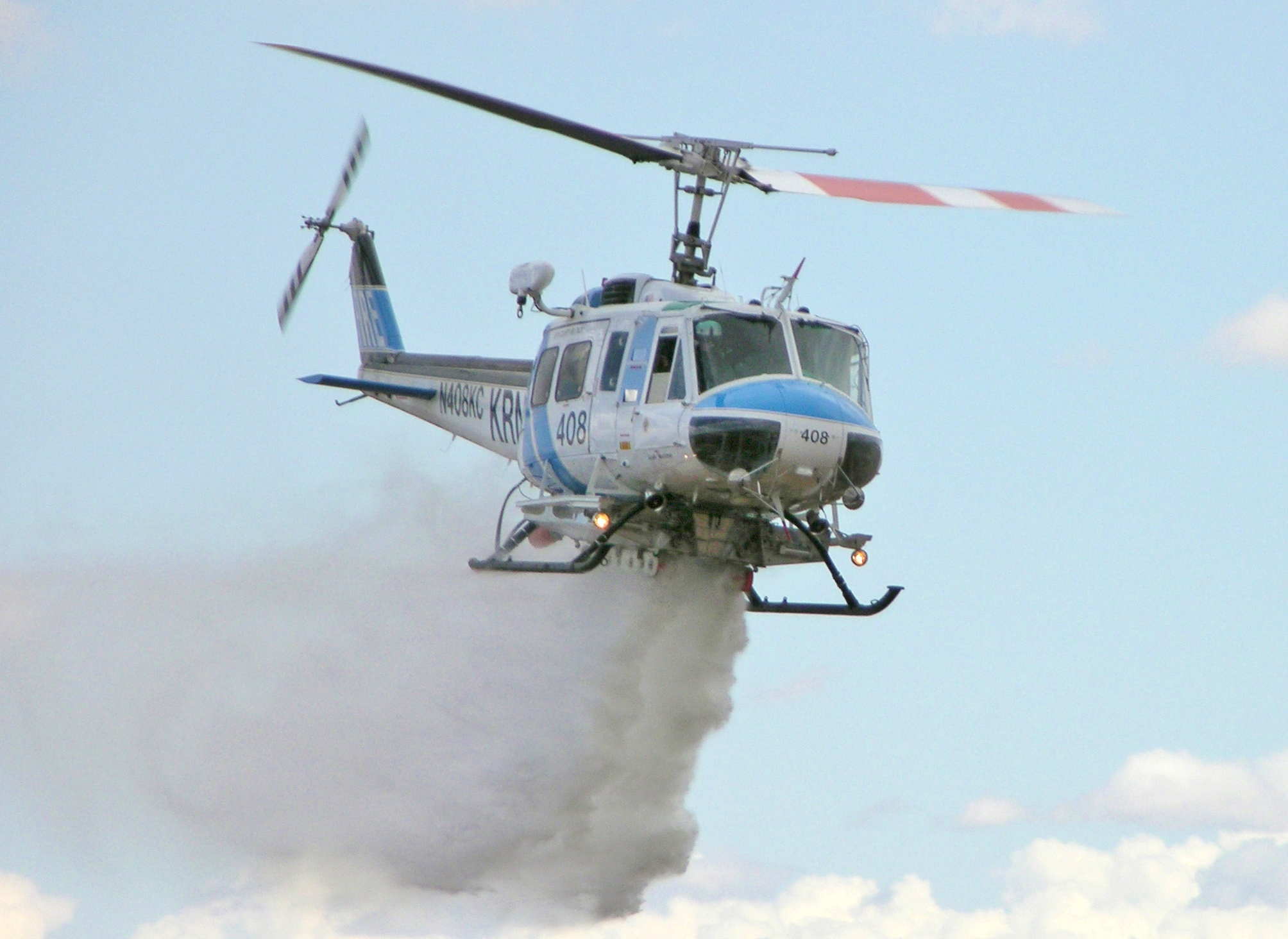
A Bell 205 dropping water onto a fire

Due to the operating characteristics of the helicopter—its ability to take off and land vertically, and to hover for extended periods of time, as well as the aircraft's handling properties under low airspeed conditions—it has proved advantageous to conduct tasks that were previously not possible with other aircraft, or were time- or work-intensive to accomplish on the ground. Today, helicopter uses include transportation of people and cargo, military uses, construction, firefighting, search and rescue, tourism, medical transport, law enforcement, agriculture, news and media, and aerial observation, among others.

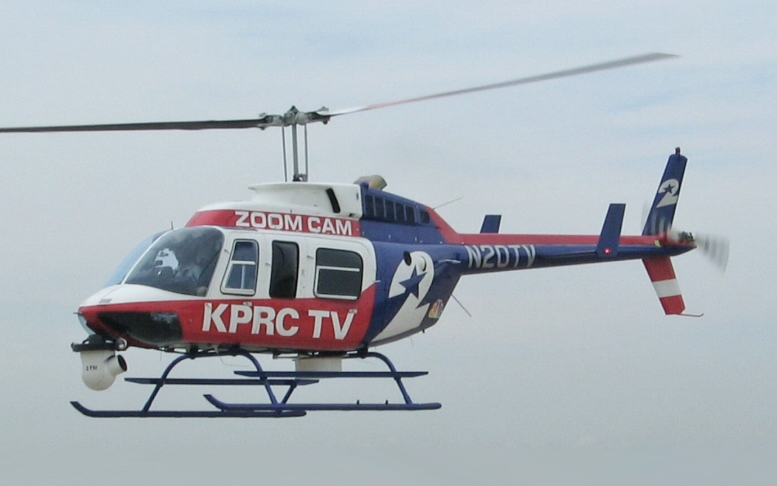
KPRC's Bell 206 providing aerial news coverage

A helicopter used to carry loads connected to long cables or slings is called an aerial crane. Aerial cranes are used to place heavy equipment, like radio transmission towers and large air conditioning units, on the tops of tall buildings, or when an item must be raised up in a remote area, such as a radio tower raised on the top of a hill or mountain. Helicopters are used as aerial cranes in the logging industry to lift trees out of terrain where vehicles cannot travel and where environmental concerns prohibit the building of roads. These operations are referred to as longline because of the long, single sling line used to carry the load. In military service helicopters are often useful for delivery of outsized slung loads that would not fit inside ordinary cargo aircraft: artillery pieces, large machinery (field radars, communications gear, electrical generators), or pallets of bulk cargo. In military operations these payloads are often delivered to remote locations made inaccessible by mountainous or riverine terrain, or naval vessels at sea.

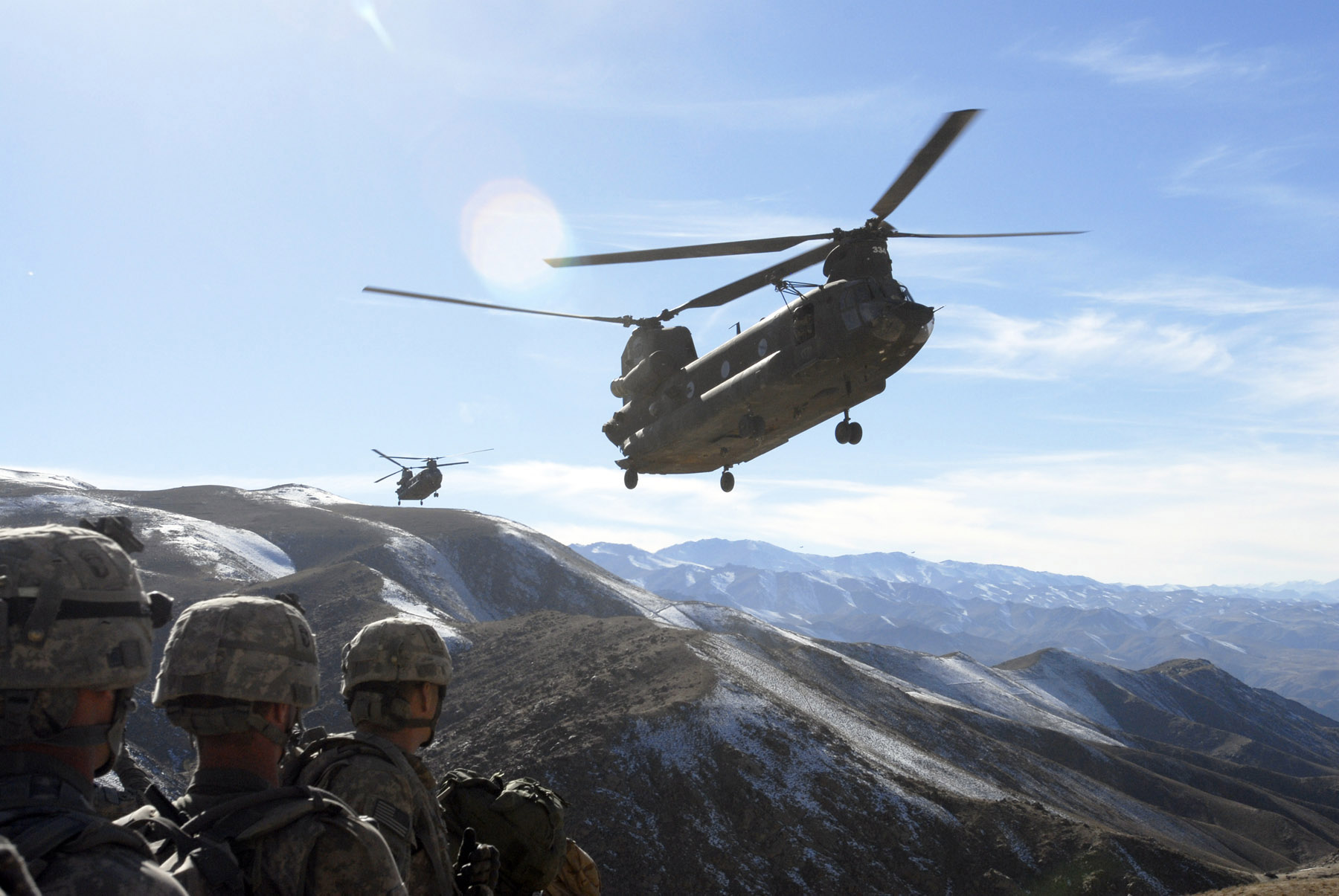
Soldiers await pickup from CH-47 helicopters

In electronic news gathering, helicopters have provided aerial views of some major news stories, and have been doing so, from the late 1960s. Helicopters have also been used in films, both in front and behind the camera. In this application and for other types of aerial camera shots captured on helicopters, unmanned aerial drones under remote control are now widely used due to lower cost.

The largest single non-combat helicopter operation in history was the disaster management operation following the 1986 Chernobyl nuclear disaster. Hundreds of pilots were involved in airdrop and observation missions, making dozens of sorties a day for several months.

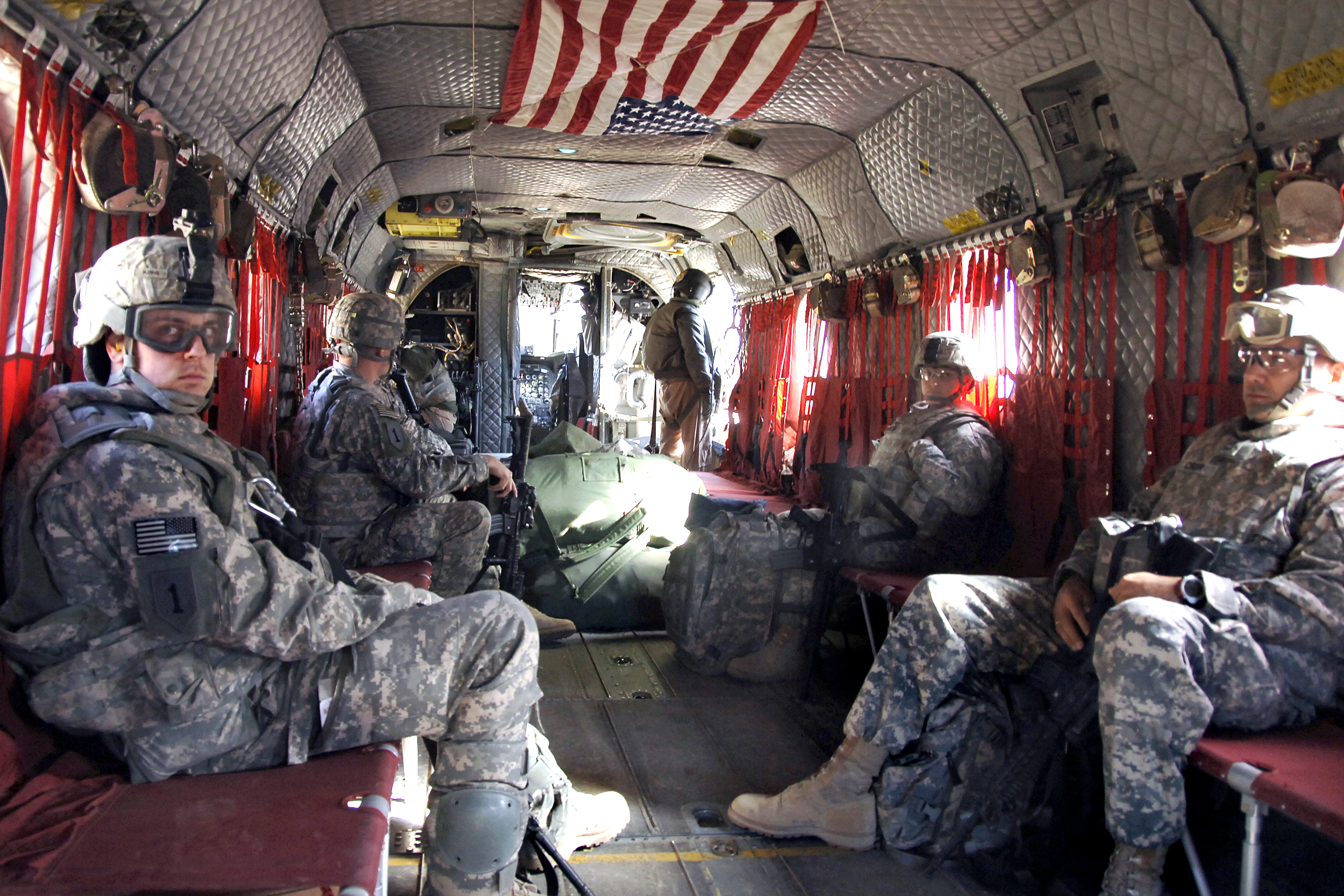
Chinook interior with passengers in seats

"Helitack" is the use of helicopters to combat wildland fires. The helicopters are used for aerial firefighting (water bombing) and may be fitted with tanks or carry helibuckets. Helibuckets, such as the Bambi bucket, are usually filled by submerging the bucket into lakes, rivers, reservoirs, or portable tanks. Tanks fitted onto helicopters are filled from a hose while the helicopter is on the ground or water is siphoned from lakes or reservoirs through a hanging snorkel as the helicopter hovers over the water source. Helitack helicopters are also used to deliver firefighters, who rappel down to inaccessible areas, and to resupply firefighters. Common firefighting helicopters include variants of the Bell 205 and the Erickson S-64 Aircrane helitanker.

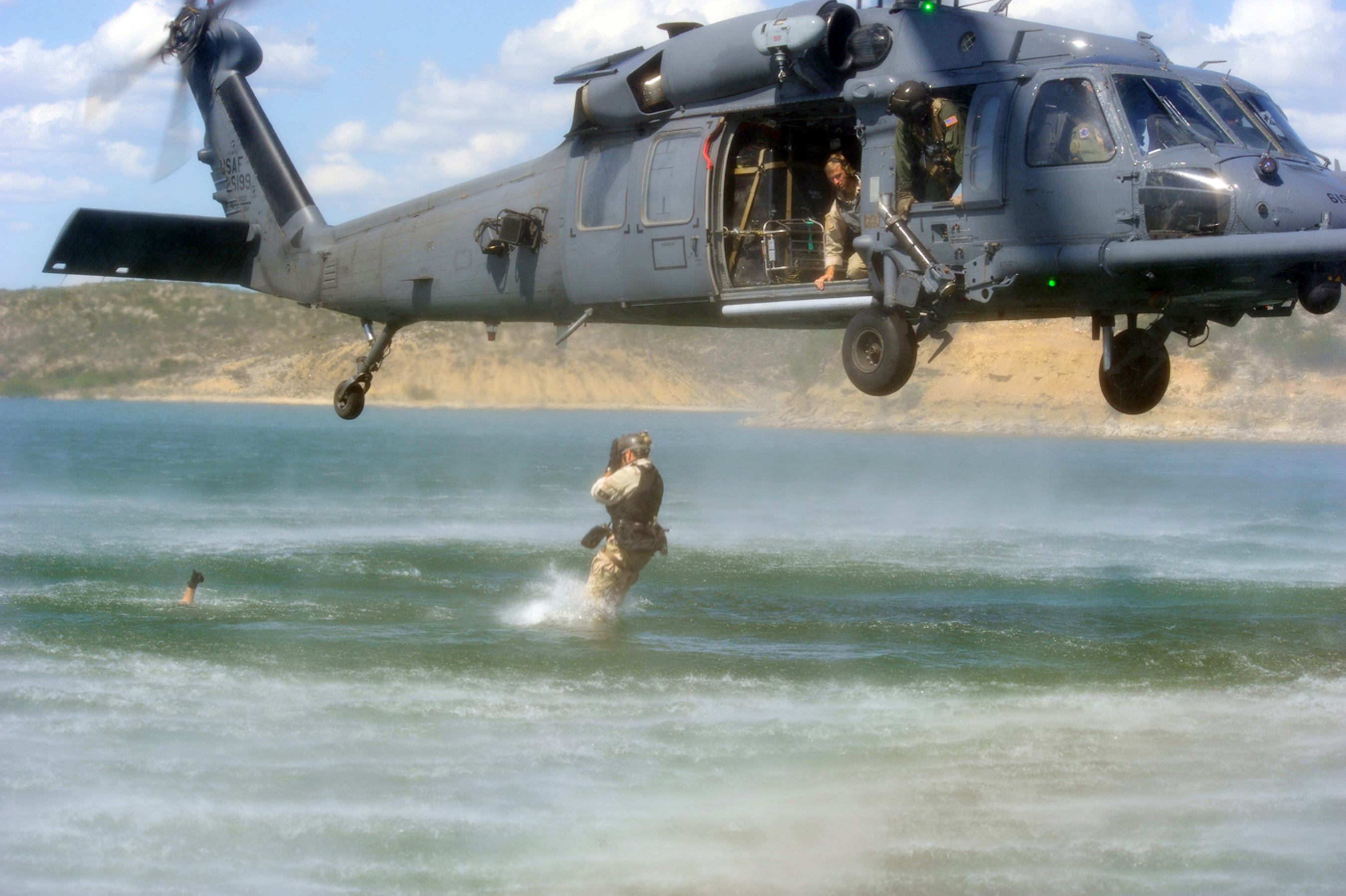
Exercises with a helicopter to rescue someone in water

Helicopters are used as air ambulances for emergency medical assistance in situations when an ambulance cannot easily or quickly reach the scene, or cannot transport the patient to a medical facility in time. Helicopters are also used when patients need to be transported between medical facilities and air transportation is the most practical method. An air ambulance helicopter is equipped to stabilize and provide limited medical treatment to a patient while in flight. The use of helicopters as air ambulances is often referred to as "MEDEVAC", and patients are referred to as being "airlifted", or "medevaced". This use was pioneered in the Korean War, when time to reach a medical facility was reduced to three hours from the eight hours needed in World War II, and further reduced to two hours by the Vietnam War. In naval service a prime function of rescue helicopters is to promptly retrieve downed aircrew involved in crashes occurring upon launch or recovery aboard aircraft carriers. In past years this function was performed by destroyers escorting the carrier, but since then helicopters have proved vastly more effective.

Police departments and other law enforcement agencies use helicopters to pursue suspects and patrol the skies. Since helicopters can achieve a unique aerial view, they are often used in conjunction with police on the ground to report on suspects' locations and movements. They are often mounted with lighting and heat-sensing equipment for night pursuits.

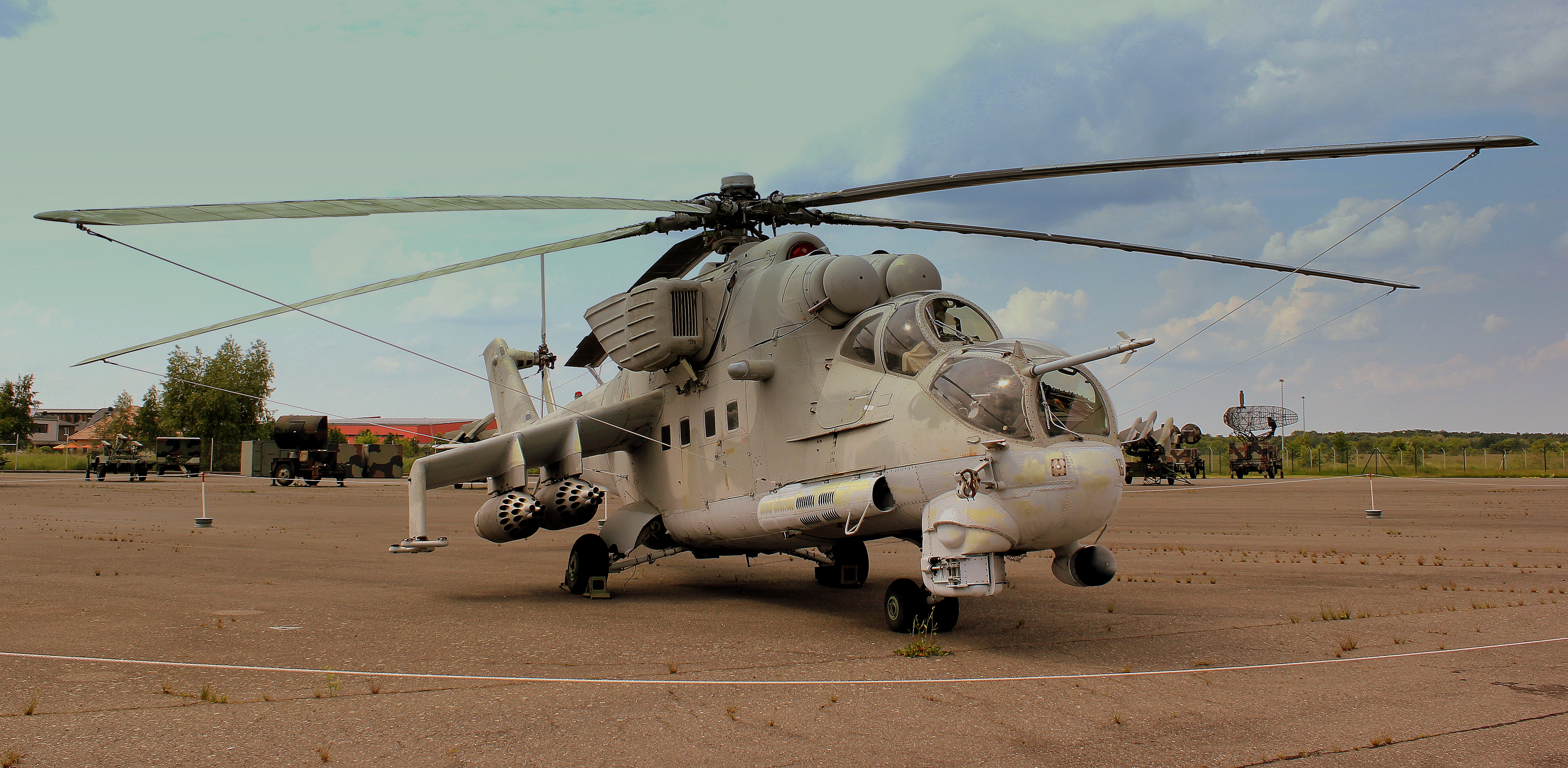
The Mil-24 'Hind' is a well-known military attack helicopter

Military forces use attack helicopters to conduct aerial attacks on ground targets. Such helicopters are mounted with missile launchers and miniguns. Transport helicopters are used to ferry troops and supplies where the lack of an airstrip would make transport via fixed-wing aircraft impossible. The use of transport helicopters to deliver troops as an attack force on an objective is referred to as "air assault". Unmanned aerial systems (UAS) helicopter systems of varying sizes are developed by companies for military reconnaissance and surveillance duties. Naval forces also use helicopters equipped with dipping sonar for anti-submarine warfare, since they can operate from small ships.

Oil companies charter helicopters to move workers and parts quickly to remote drilling sites located at sea or in remote locations. The speed advantage over boats makes the high operating cost of helicopters cost-effective in ensuring that oil platforms continue to operate. Various companies specialize in this type of operation.

NASA developed Ingenuity, a 1.8 kg (4.0 lb) helicopter used to survey Mars (along with a rover). It began service in February 2021 and was retired due to sustained rotor blade damage in January 2024 after 73 sorties. As the Martian atmosphere is 100 times thinner than Earth's, its two blades spin at close to 3,000 revolutions a minute, approximately 10 times faster than that of a terrestrial helicopter.

=== Market ===
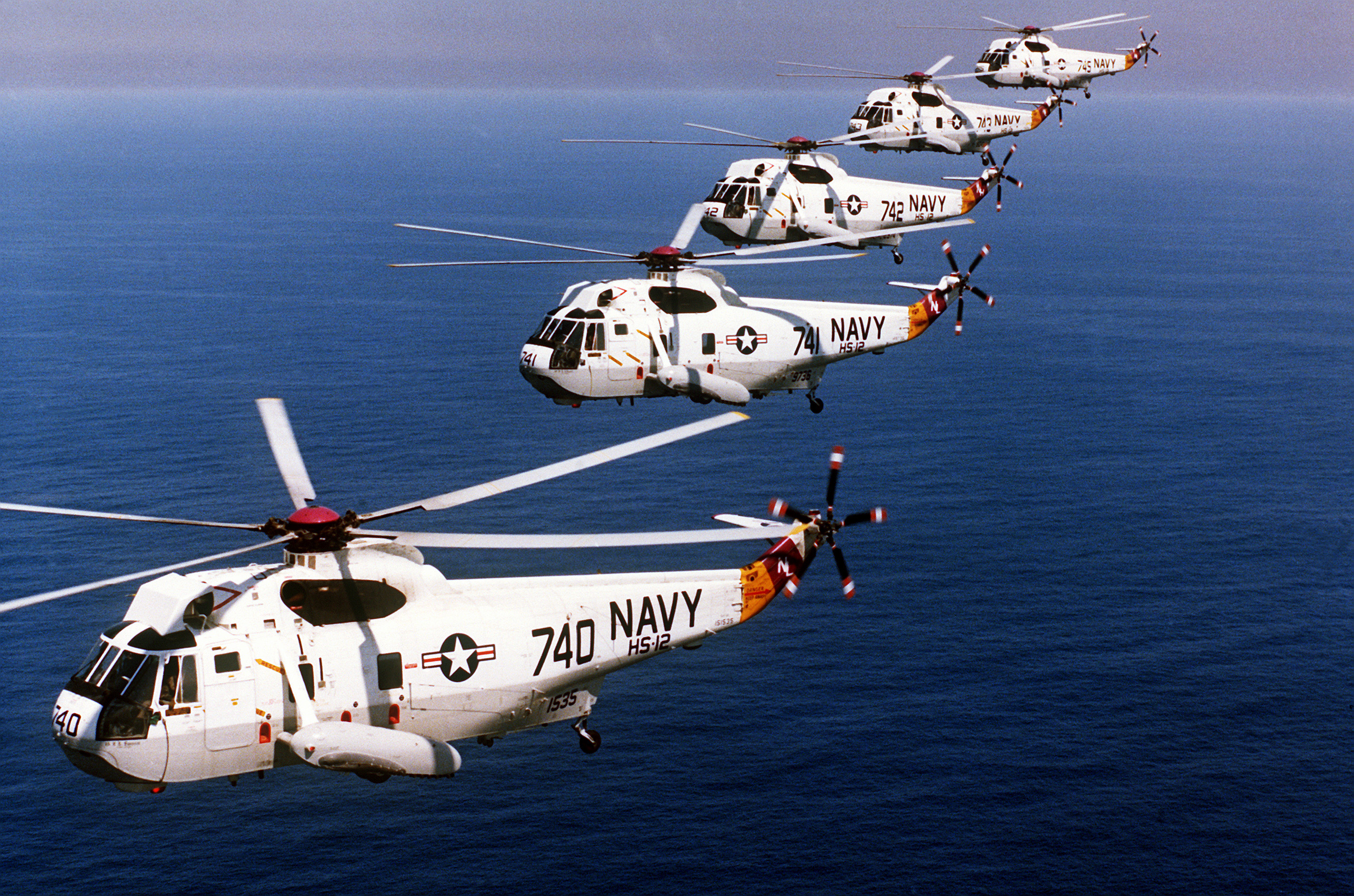
Helicopter Anti-Submarine Squadron HS-12 "Wyverns" flying SH-3H Sea Kings in formation, 1985. Military helicopters are a significant part of the helicopter market

In 2017, 926 civil helicopters were shipped for $3.68 billion, led by Airbus Helicopters with $1.87 billion for 369 rotorcraft, Leonardo Helicopters with $806 million for 102 (first three-quarters only), Bell Helicopter with $696 million for 132, then Robinson Helicopter with $161 million for 305.

By October 2018, the in-service and stored helicopter fleet of 38,570 with civil or government operators was led by Robinson Helicopter with 24.7% followed by Airbus Helicopters with 24.4%, then Bell with 20.5 and Leonardo with 8.4%, Russian Helicopters with 7.7%, Sikorsky Aircraft with 7.2%, MD Helicopters with 3.4% and other with 2.2%. The most widespread model is the piston Robinson R44 with 5,600, then the H125/AS350 with 3,600 units, followed by the Bell 206 with 3,400. Most were in North America with 34.3% then in Europe with 28.0% followed by Asia-Pacific with 18.6%, Latin America with 11.6%, Africa with 5.3% and Middle East with 1.7%.

== History ==
=== Early design ===
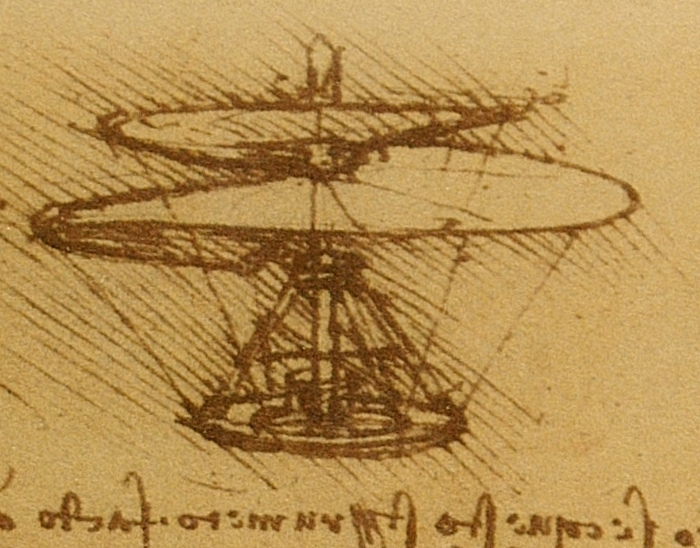
Leonardo's "aerial screw"

The earliest references for vertical flight came from China. Since around 400 BC, Chinese children have played with bamboo flying toys (or Chinese top). This bamboo-copter is spun by rolling a stick attached to a rotor. The spinning creates lift, and the toy flies when released. The 4th-century AD Daoist book Baopuzi by Ge Hong (抱朴子 "Master who Embraces Simplicity") reportedly describes some of the ideas inherent to rotary wing aircraft.

Designs similar to the Chinese helicopter toy appeared in some Renaissance paintings and other works. In the 18th and early 19th centuries Western scientists developed flying machines based on the Chinese toy.

It was not until the early 1480s, when Italian polymath Leonardo da Vinci created a design for a machine that could be described as an "aerial screw", that any recorded advancement was made towards vertical flight. His notes suggested that he built small flying models, but there were no indications for any provision to stop the rotor from making the craft rotate. As scientific knowledge increased and became more accepted, people continued to pursue the idea of vertical flight.

In July 1754, Russian Mikhail Lomonosov had developed a small coaxial modeled after the Chinese top but powered by a wound-up spring device and demonstrated it to the Russian Academy of Sciences. It was powered by a spring, and was suggested as a method to lift meteorological instruments. In 1783, Christian de Launoy, and his mechanic, Bienvenu, used a coaxial version of the Chinese top in a model consisting of contrarotating turkey flight feathers as rotor blades, and in 1784, demonstrated it to the French Academy of Sciences. Sir George Cayley, influenced by a childhood fascination with the Chinese flying top, developed a model of feathers, similar to that of Launoy and Bienvenu, but powered by rubber bands. By the end of the century, he had progressed to using sheets of tin for rotor blades and springs for power. His writings on his experiments and models would become influential on future aviation pioneers. Alphonse Pénaud would later develop coaxial rotor model helicopter toys in 1870, also powered by rubber bands. One of these toys, given as a gift by their father, would inspire the Wright brothers to pursue the dream of flight.

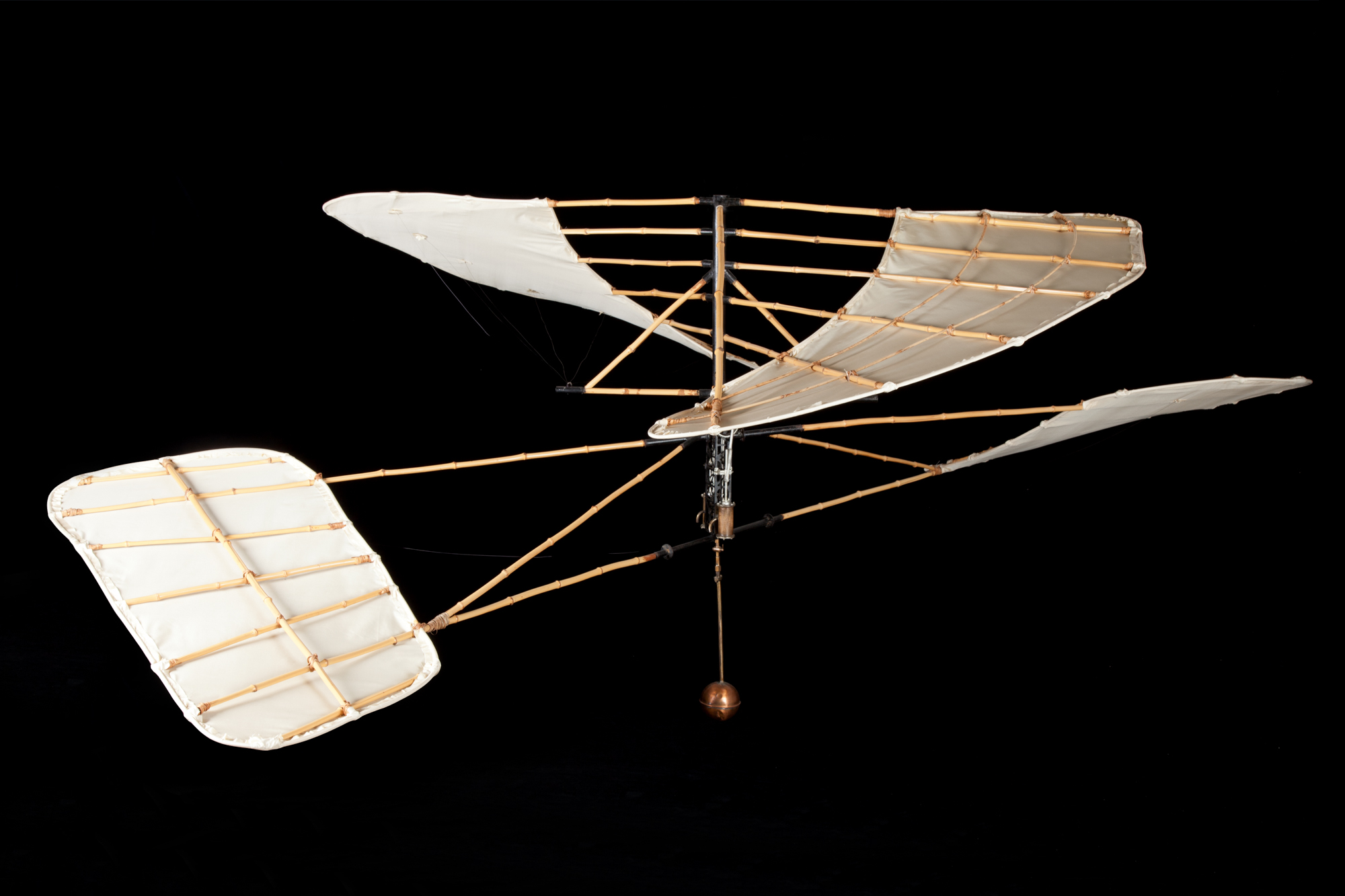
Experimental helicopter by Enrico Forlanini (1877), exposed at the Museo nazionale della scienza e della tecnologia Leonardo da Vinci of Milan, Italy

In 1861, the word "helicopter" was coined by Gustave de Ponton d'Amécourt, a French inventor who demonstrated a small steam-powered model. While celebrated as an innovative use of a new metal, aluminum, the model never lifted off the ground. D'Amecourt's linguistic contribution would survive to eventually describe the vertical flight he had envisioned. Steam power was popular with other inventors as well. In 1877, the Italian engineer, inventor and aeronautical pioneer Enrico Forlanini developed an unmanned helicopter powered by a steam engine. It rose to a height of 13 meters (43 feet), where it remained for 20 seconds, after a vertical take-off from a park in Milan. Milan has dedicated its city airport to Enrico Forlanini, also named Linate Airport, as well as the nearby park, the Parco Forlanini. Emmanuel Dieuaide's steam-powered design featured counter-rotating rotors powered through a hose from a boiler on the ground. In 1887 Parisian inventor, Gustave Trouvé, built and flew a tethered electric model helicopter.

In July 1901, the maiden flight of Hermann Ganswindt's helicopter took place in Berlin-Schöneberg; this was probably the first heavier-than-air motor-driven flight carrying humans. A movie covering the event was taken by Max Skladanowsky, but it remains lost.

In 1885, Thomas Edison was given US$1,000 (equivalent to $36,000 today) by James Gordon Bennett, Jr., to conduct experiments towards developing flight. Edison built a helicopter and used the paper for a stock ticker to create guncotton, with which he attempted to power an internal combustion engine. The helicopter was damaged by explosions and one of his workers was badly burned. Edison reported that it would take a motor with a ratio of three to four pounds per horsepower produced to be successful, based on his experiments. Ján Bahýľ, a Slovak inventor, adapted the internal combustion engine to power his helicopter model that reached a height of 0.5 meters (1.6 feet) in 1901. On 5 May 1905, his helicopter reached 4 meters (13 feet) in altitude and flew for over 1,500 meters (4,900 feet). In 1908, Edison patented his own design for a helicopter powered by a gasoline engine with box kites attached to a mast by cables for a rotor, but it never flew.

=== First flights ===
In 1906, two French brothers, Jacques and Louis Breguet, began experimenting with airfoils for helicopters. In 1907, those experiments resulted in the Gyroplane No.1, possibly as the earliest known example of a quadcopter. Although there is some uncertainty about the date, sometime between 14 August and 29 September 1907, the Gyroplane No. 1 lifted its pilot into the air about 0.6 metres (2 ft) for a minute. The Gyroplane No. 1 proved to be extremely unsteady and required a man at each corner of the airframe to hold it steady. For this reason, the flights of the Gyroplane No. 1 are considered to be the first manned flight of a helicopter, but not a free or untethered flight.

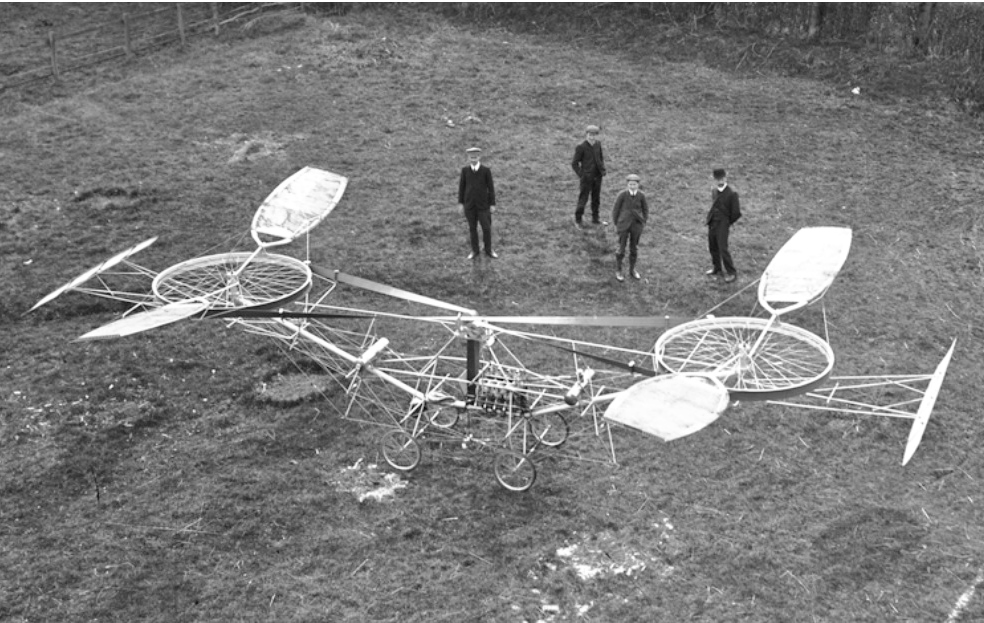
Paul Cornu's helicopter, 1907

That same year, fellow French inventor Paul Cornu designed and built the Cornu helicopter which used two 6.1-metre (20 ft) counter-rotating rotors driven by a 24 hp (18 kW) Antoinette engine. On 13 November 1907, it lifted its inventor to 0.3 metres (1 ft) and remained aloft for 20 seconds. Even though this flight did not surpass the flight of the Gyroplane No. 1, it was reported to be the first truly free flight with a pilot. (Note: Leishman, J. Gordon, Technical Fellow of AHS International. "Paper". 64th Annual Forum of the American Helicopter Society International, on the aerodynamic capability of Cornu's design, arguing that the aircraft lacked the power and rotor loading to lift free of the ground in manned flight.) Cornu's helicopter completed a few more flights and achieved a height of nearly 2.0 metres (6.5 ft), but it proved to be unstable and was abandoned.

In 1909, J. Newton Williams of Derby, Connecticut, and Emile Berliner of Washington, D.C., flew a helicopter "on three occasions" at Berliner's lab in Washington's Brightwood neighborhood.

In 1911, Slovenian philosopher and economist Ivan Slokar patented a helicopter configuration.

The Danish inventor Jacob Ellehammer built the Ellehammer helicopter in 1912. It consisted of a frame equipped with two counter-rotating discs, each of which was fitted with six vanes around its circumference. After indoor tests, the aircraft was demonstrated outdoors and made several free take-offs. Experiments with the helicopter continued until September 1916, when it tipped over during take-off, destroying its rotors.

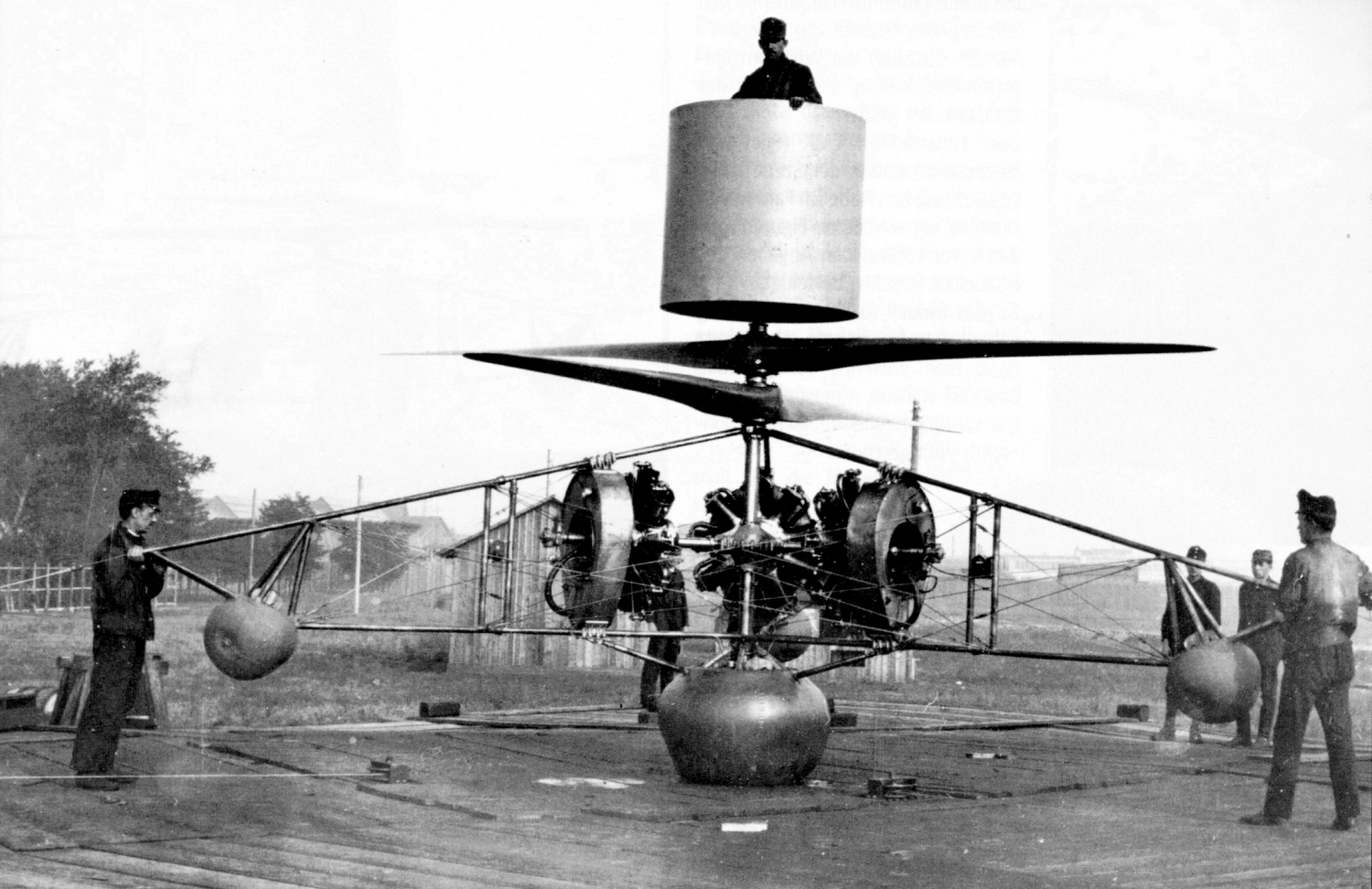
The PKZ-2 with a single observer on board

During World War I, Austria-Hungary developed the PKZ, an experimental helicopter prototype, with two aircraft built.

=== Early development ===
Silent film of a test flight of Pescara's helicopter, 1922. EYE Film Institute Netherlands.

In the early 1920s, Argentine Raúl Pateras-Pescara de Castelluccio, while working in Europe, demonstrated one of the first successful applications of cyclic pitch. Coaxial, contra-rotating, biplane rotors could be warped to cyclically increase and decrease the lift they produced. The rotor hub could also be tilted forward a few degrees, allowing the aircraft to move forward without a separate propeller to push or pull it. Pateras-Pescara was also able to demonstrate the principle of autorotation. By January 1924, Pescara's helicopter No. 1 was tested but was found to be underpowered and could not lift its own weight. His 2F fared better and set a record. The British government funded further research by Pescara which resulted in helicopter No. 3, powered by a 250-horsepower (190 kW) radial engine which could fly for up to ten minutes.

In March 1923 Time magazine reported Thomas Edison sent George de Bothezat a congratulations for a successful helicopter test flight. Edison wrote, "So far as I know, you have produced the first successful helicopter." The helicopter was tested at McCook's Field and remained airborne for 2 minutes and 45 seconds at a height of 15 feet.

On 14 April 1924, Frenchman Étienne Oehmichen set the first helicopter world record recognized by the Fédération Aéronautique Internationale (FAI), flying his quadrotor helicopter 360 meters (1,180 ft). On 18 April 1924, Pescara beat Oemichen's record, flying for a distance of 736 meters (2,415 ft) (nearly 0.80 kilometers or .5 miles) in 4 minutes and 11 seconds (about 13 km/h or 8 mph), maintaining a height of 1.8 meters (6 feet). On 4 May, Oehmichen completed the first one-kilometer (0.62 mi) closed-circuit helicopter flight in 7 minutes 40 seconds with his No. 2 machine.

In the US, George de Bothezat built the quadrotor helicopter de Bothezat helicopter for the United States Army Air Service but the Army cancelled the program in 1924, and the aircraft was scrapped.

Albert Gillis von Baumhauer, a Dutch aeronautical engineer, began studying rotorcraft design in 1923. His first prototype "flew" ("hopped" and hovered in reality) on 24 September 1925, with Dutch Army-Air arm Captain Floris Albert van Heijst at the controls. The controls that van Heijst used were von Baumhauer's inventions, the cyclic and collective. Patents were granted to von Baumhauer for his cyclic and collective controls by the British ministry of aviation on 31 January 1927, under patent number 265,272.

In 1927, Engelbert Zaschka from Germany built a helicopter, equipped with two rotors, in which a gyroscope was used to increase stability and serves as an energy accumulator for a gliding flight to make a landing. Zaschka's aircraft, the first helicopter, which ever worked so successfully in miniature, not only rises and descends vertically, but is able to remain stationary at any height.

In 1928, Hungarian aviation engineer Oszkár Asbóth constructed a helicopter prototype that took off and landed at least 182 times, with a maximum single flight duration of 53 minutes.

In 1930, the Italian engineer Corradino D'Ascanio built his D'AT3, a coaxial helicopter. His relatively large machine had two, two-bladed, counter-rotating rotors. Control was achieved by using auxiliary wings or servo-tabs on the trailing edges of the blades, a concept that was later adopted by other helicopter designers, including Bleeker and Kaman. Three small propellers mounted to the airframe were used for additional pitch, roll, and yaw control. The D'AT3 held modest FAI speed and altitude records for the time, including altitude (18 m or 59 ft), duration (8 minutes 45 seconds) and distance flown (1,078 m or 3,540 ft).

==== First practical rotorcraft ====
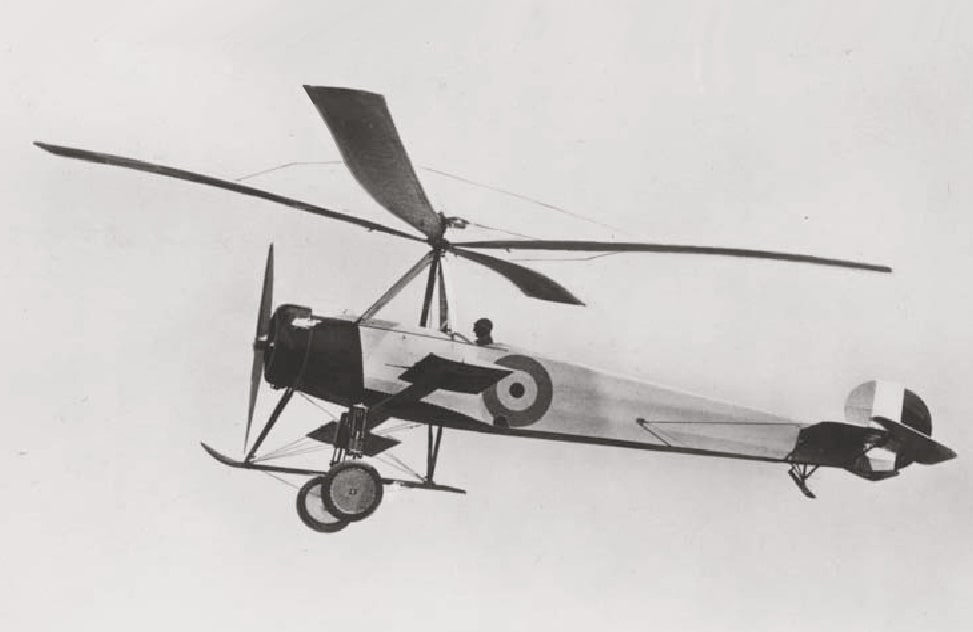
A Cierva autogyro in the 1920s, one of the predecessors to helicopters

Spanish aeronautical engineer and pilot Juan de la Cierva invented the autogyro in the early 1920s, becoming the first practical rotorcraft. In 1928, de la Cierva successfully flew an autogyro across the English Channel, from London to Paris. In 1934, an autogyro became the first rotorcraft to successfully take off and land on the deck of a ship. That same year, the autogyro was employed by the Spanish military during the Asturias revolt, becoming the first military deployment of a rotorcraft. Autogyros were also employed in New Jersey and Pennsylvania for delivering mail and newspapers prior to the invention of the helicopter. Though lacking true vertical flight capability, work on the autogyro forms the basis for helicopter analysis.

==== Single lift-rotor success ====
In the Soviet Union, Boris N. Yuriev and Alexei M. Cheremukhin, two aeronautical engineers working at the Tsentralniy Aerogidrodinamicheskiy Institut (TsAGI or the Central Aerohydrodynamic Institute), constructed and flew the TsAGI 1-EA single lift-rotor helicopter, which used an open tubing framework, a four-blade main lift rotor, and twin sets of 1.8-meter (5.9-foot) diameter, two-bladed anti-torque rotors: one set of two at the nose and one set of two at the tail. Powered by two M-2 powerplants, up-rated copies of the Gnome Monosoupape 9 Type B-2 100 CV output rotary engine of World War I, the TsAGI 1-EA made several low altitude flights. By 14 August 1932, Cheremukhin managed to get the 1-EA up to an unofficial altitude of 605 meters (1,985 feet), shattering d'Ascanio's earlier achievement. As the Soviet Union was not yet a member of the FAI, however, Cheremukhin's record remained unrecognized.

Nicolas Florine, a Russian engineer, built the first twin tandem rotor machine to perform a free flight. It flew in Sint-Genesius-Rode, at the Laboratoire Aérotechnique de Belgique (now von Karman Institute) in April 1933, and attained an altitude of six meters (20 feet) and an endurance of eight minutes. Florine chose a co-rotating configuration because the gyroscopic stability of the rotors would not cancel. Therefore, the rotors had to be tilted slightly in opposite directions to counter torque. Using hingeless rotors and co-rotation also minimised the stress on the hull. At the time, it was one of the most stable helicopters in existence.

The Bréguet-Dorand Gyroplane Laboratoire was built in 1933. It was a coaxial helicopter, contra-rotating. After many ground tests and an accident, it first took flight on 26 June 1935. Within a short time, the aircraft was setting records with pilot Maurice Claisse at the controls. On 14 December 1935, he set a record for closed-circuit flight with a 500-meter (1,600-foot) diameter. The next year, on 26 September 1936, Claisse set a height record of 158 meters (518 feet). And, finally, on 24 November 1936, he set a flight duration record of one hour, two minutes and 50 seconds over a 44 kilometers (27 miles) closed circuit at 44.7 kilometres per hour (27.8 mph). The aircraft was destroyed in 1943 by an Allied airstrike at Villacoublay airport.

==== American single-rotor beginnings ====
American inventor Arthur M. Young started work on model helicopters in 1928 using converted electric hover motors to drive the rotor head. Young invented the stabilizer bar and patented it shortly after. A mutual friend introduced Young to Lawrence Dale, who once seeing his work asked him to join the Bell Aircraft company. When Young arrived at Bell in 1941, he signed his patent over and began work on the helicopter. His budget was US$250,000 (equivalent to $5.5 million today) to build two working helicopters. In just six months they completed the first Bell Model 1, which spawned the Bell Model 30, later succeeded by the Bell 47.

=== Birth of an industry ===
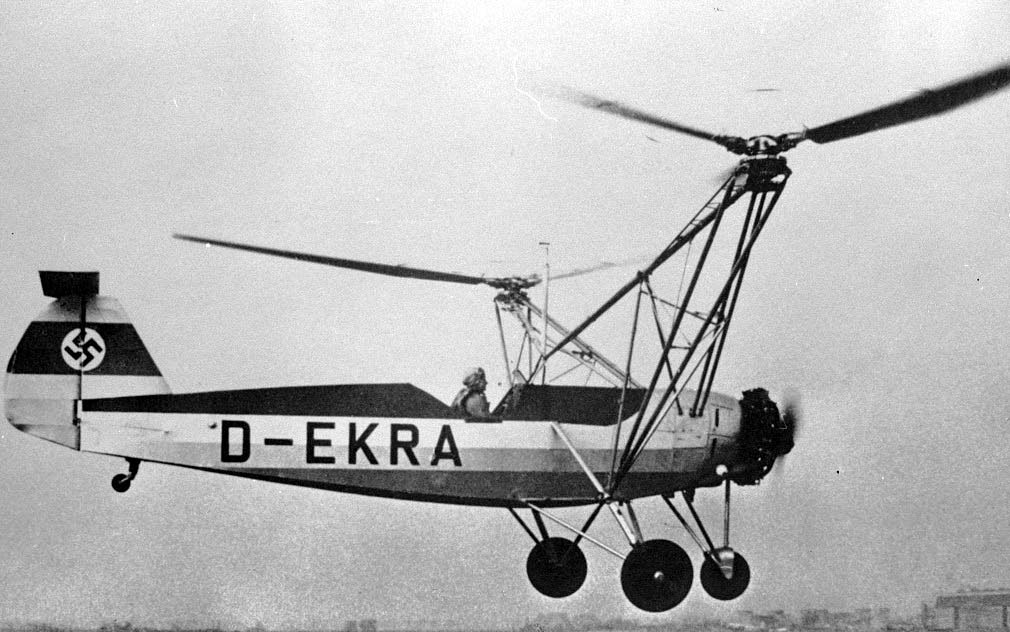
Focke-Wulf Fw 61, the first successful helicopter

Heinrich Focke at Focke-Wulf had purchased a license from Cierva Autogiro Company, which according to Frank Kingston Smith Sr., included "the fully controllable cyclic/collective pitch hub system". In return, Cierva Autogiro received a cross-license to build the Focke-Achgelis helicopters. Focke designed the world's first practical helicopter, the transverse twin-rotor Focke-Wulf Fw 61, which first flew in June 1936. It was demonstrated by Hanna Reitsch in February 1938 inside the Deutschlandhalle in Berlin. The Fw 61 set a number of FAI records from 1937 to 1939, including: maximum altitude of 3,427 metres (11,243 ft), maximum distance of 230 kilometres (140 mi), and maximum speed of 124 kilometres per hour (77 mph). Autogiro development was now being bypassed by a focus on helicopters.

During World War II, Nazi Germany used helicopters in small numbers for observation, transport, and medical evacuation. The Flettner Fl 282 Kolibri synchropter—using the same basic configuration as Anton Flettner's own pioneering Fl 265—was used in the Baltic, Mediterranean, and Aegean Seas. The Focke-Achgelis Fa 223 Drache, like the Fw 61, used two transverse rotors, and was the largest rotorcraft of the war. Extensive bombing by the Allied forces prevented Germany from producing helicopters in large quantities during the war.

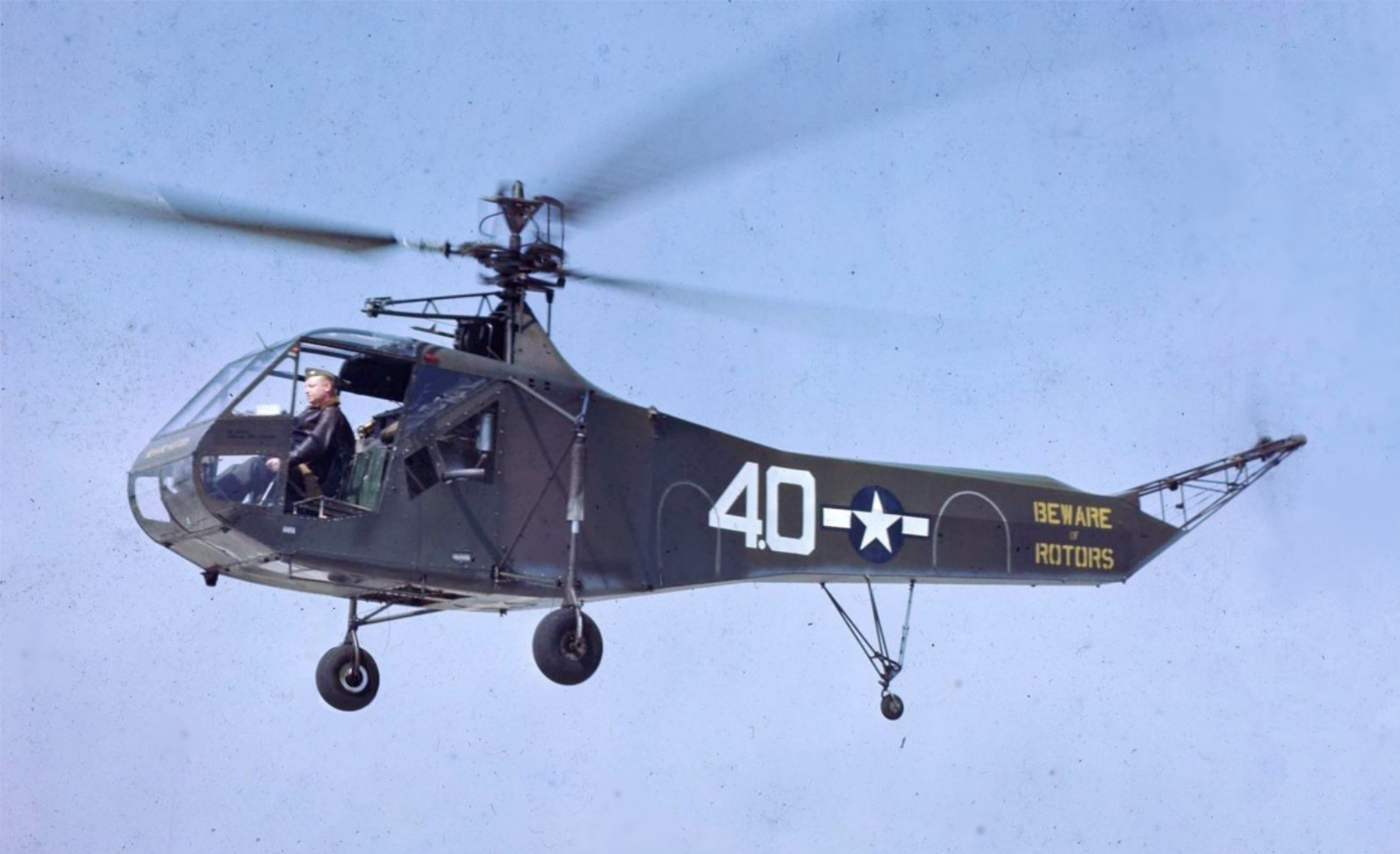
The Sikorsky R-4 became the first mass-produced helicopter in the early 1940s, and was capable of vertical takeoff. It performed the first medevac flights during WW2.

In the United States, Russian-born engineer Igor Sikorsky and Wynn Laurence LePage competed to produce the U.S. military's first helicopter. LePage received the patent rights to develop helicopters patterned after the Fw 61, and built the XR-1 in 1941. Meanwhile, Sikorsky settled on a simpler, single-rotor design, the VS-300 of 1939, which turned out to be the first practical single lifting-rotor helicopter design. After experimenting with configurations to counteract the torque produced by the single main rotor, Sikorsky settled on a single, smaller rotor mounted on the tail boom.

Developed from the VS-300, Sikorsky's R-4 of 1942 was the first large-scale mass-produced helicopter, with a production order for 100 aircraft. The R-4 was the only Allied helicopter to serve in World War II, used primarily for search and rescue (by the USAAF 1st Air Commando Group) in the Burma campaign; in Alaska; and in other areas with harsh terrain. Total production reached 131 helicopters before the R-4 was replaced by other Sikorsky helicopters such as the R-5 and the R-6. In all, Sikorsky produced over 400 helicopters before the end of World War II.

While LePage and Sikorsky built their helicopters for the military, Bell Aircraft hired Arthur Young to help build a helicopter using Young's two-blade teetering rotor design, which used a weighted stabilizer bar placed at a 90° angle to the rotor blades. The subsequent Model 30 helicopter of 1943 showed the design's simplicity and ease of use. The Model 30 was developed into the Bell 47 of 1945, which became the first helicopter certified for civilian use in the United States (March 1946). Produced in several countries, the Bell 47 was the most popular helicopter model for nearly 30 years.

=== Turbine age ===
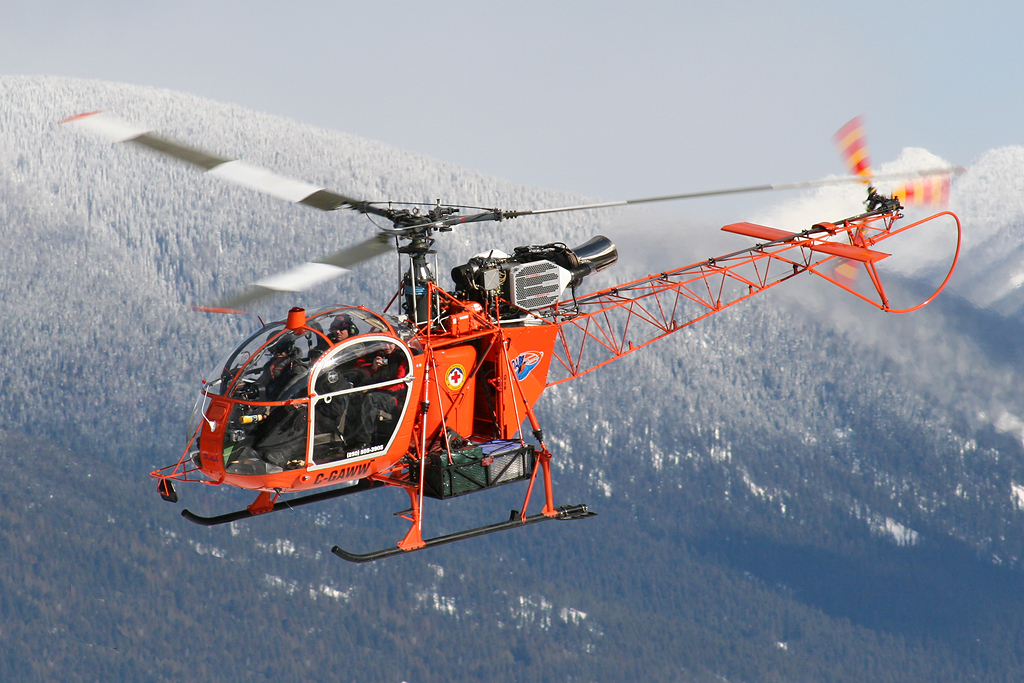
A turbine powered helicopter with its engine visible

In 1951, at the urging of his contacts at the Department of the Navy, Charles Kaman modified his K-225 synchropter—a design for a twin-rotor helicopter concept first pioneered by Anton Flettner in 1939, with the aforementioned Fl 265 piston-engined design in Germany—with a new kind of engine, the turboshaft engine. This adaptation of the turbine engine provided a large amount of power to Kaman's helicopter with a lower weight penalty than piston engines, with their heavy engine blocks and auxiliary components. On 11 December 1951, the Kaman K-225 became the first turbine-powered helicopter in the world. Two years later, on 26 March 1954, a modified Navy HTK-1, another Kaman helicopter, became the first twin-turbine helicopter to fly. However, it was the Sud Aviation Alouette II that would become the first helicopter to be produced with a turbine-engine.

Reliable helicopters capable of stable hover flight were developed decades after fixed-wing aircraft. This is largely due to higher engine power density requirements than fixed-wing aircraft. Improvements in fuels and engines during the first half of the 20th century were a critical factor in helicopter development. The availability of lightweight turboshaft engines in the second half of the 20th century led to the development of larger, faster, and higher-performance helicopters. While smaller and less expensive helicopters still use piston engines, turboshaft engines are the preferred powerplant for helicopters today.

== Safety ==
=== Maximum speed limit ===
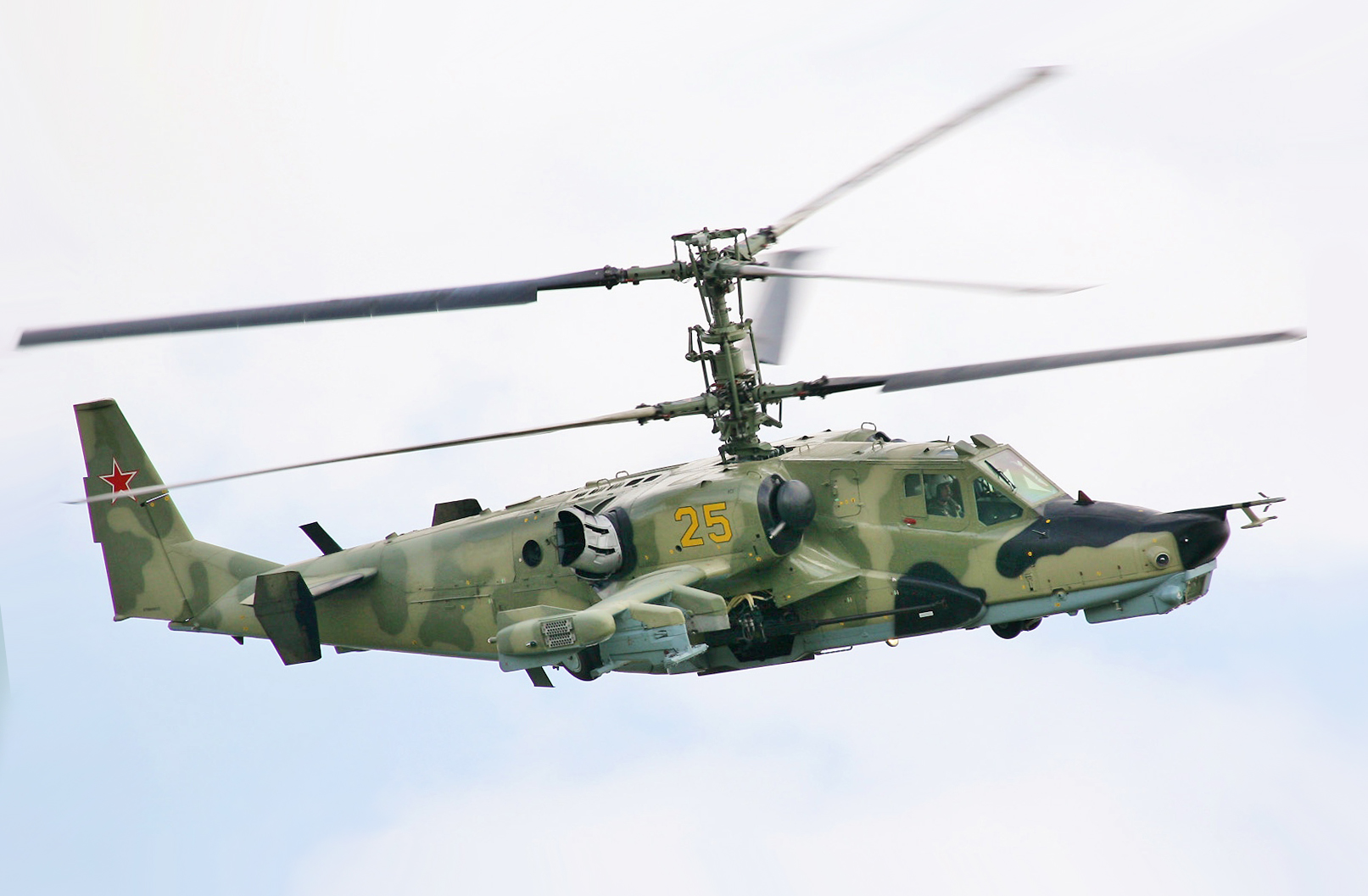
A Russian Air Force Kamov Ka-50 using a coaxial rotor system

There are several reasons a helicopter cannot fly as fast as a fixed-wing aircraft. When the helicopter is hovering, the outer tips of the rotor travel at a speed determined by the length of the blade and the rotational speed. In a moving helicopter, however, the speed of the blades relative to the air depends on the speed of the helicopter as well as on their rotational speed. The airspeed of the advancing rotor blade is much higher than that of the helicopter itself. It is possible for this blade to exceed the speed of sound, and thus produce vastly increased drag and vibration.

At the same time, the advancing blade creates more lift traveling forward, the retreating blade produces less lift. If the aircraft were to accelerate to the air speed that the blade tips are spinning, the retreating blade passes through air moving at the same speed of the blade and produces no lift at all, resulting in very high torque stresses on the central shaft that can tip down the retreating-blade side of the vehicle, and cause a loss of control. Dual counter-rotating blades prevent this situation due to having two advancing and two retreating blades with balanced forces.

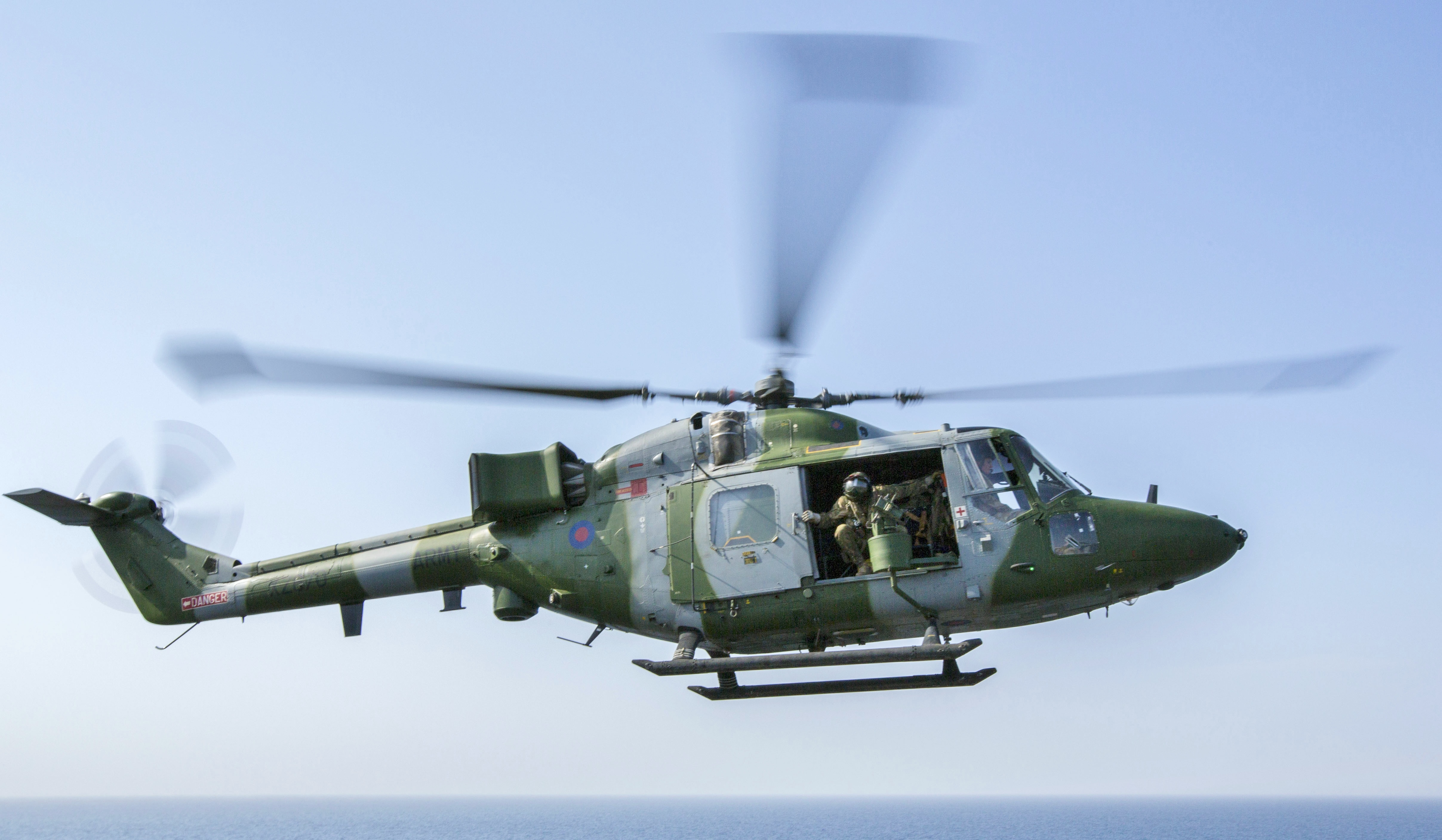
The Lynx helicopter is noted for its speed

Because the advancing blade has higher airspeed than the retreating blade and generates a dissymmetry of lift, rotor blades are designed to "flap" – lift and twist in such a way that the advancing blade flaps up and develops a smaller angle of attack. Conversely, the retreating blade flaps down, develops a higher angle of attack, and generates more lift. At high speeds, the force on the rotors is such that they "flap" excessively, and the retreating blade can reach too high an angle and stall. For this reason, the maximum safe forward airspeed of a helicopter is given a design rating called V_{NE}, velocity, never exceed. In addition, it is possible for the helicopter to fly at an airspeed where an excessive amount of the retreating blade stalls, which results in high vibration, pitch-up, and roll into the retreating blade.

=== Noise ===
At the end of the 20th century, designers began working on helicopter noise reduction. Urban communities have often expressed great dislike of noisy aviation or noisy aircraft, and police and passenger helicopters can be unpopular because of the sound. The redesigns followed the closure of some city heliports and government action to constrain flight paths in national parks and other places of natural beauty.

=== Vibration ===
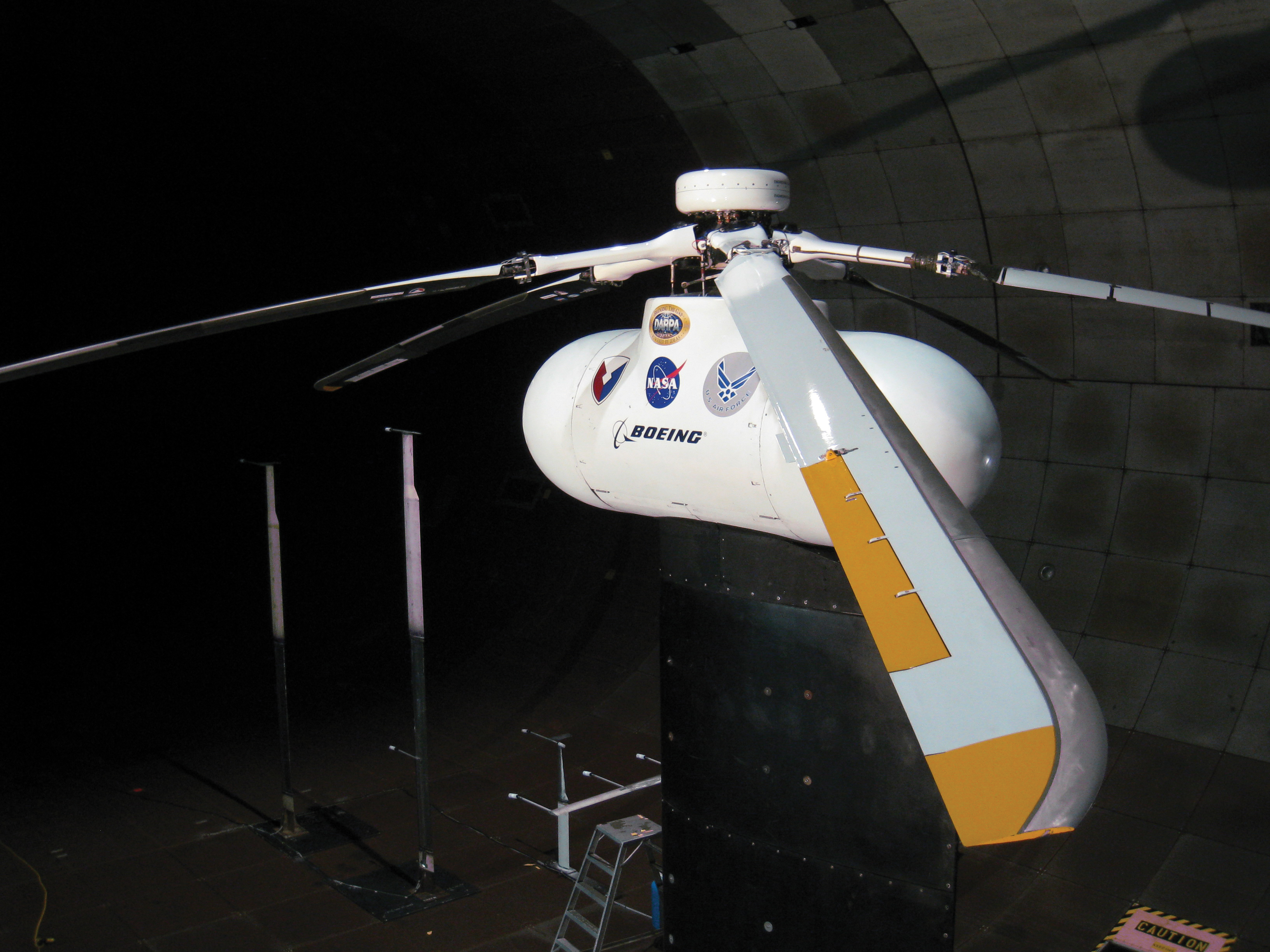
NASA experiment for piezoelectric rotor blades to potentially reduce the noise and vibration

To reduce vibration, all helicopters have rotor adjustments for height and weight. A maladjusted helicopter can easily vibrate so much that it will shake itself apart. Blade height is adjusted by changing the pitch of the blade. Weight is adjusted by adding or removing weights on the rotor head and/or at the blade end caps. Most also have vibration dampers for height and pitch. Some also use mechanical feedback systems to sense and counter vibration. Usually the feedback system uses a mass as a "stable reference" and a linkage from the mass operates a flap to adjust the rotor's angle of attack to counter the vibration. Adjustment can be difficult in part because measurement of the vibration is hard, usually requiring sophisticated accelerometers mounted throughout the airframe and gearboxes. The most common blade vibration adjustment measurement system is to use a stroboscopic flash lamp, and observe painted markings or coloured reflectors on the underside of the rotor blades. The traditional low-tech system is to mount coloured chalk on the rotor tips, and see how they mark a linen sheet. Health and Usage Monitoring Systems (HUMS) provide vibration monitoring and rotor track and balance solutions to limit vibration. Gearbox vibration most often requires a gearbox overhaul or replacement. Gearbox or drive train vibrations can be extremely harmful to a pilot. The most severe effects are pain, numbness, and loss of tactile discrimination or dexterity.

=== Loss of tail-rotor effectiveness ===
For a standard helicopter with a single main rotor, the tips of the main rotor blades produce a vortex ring in the air, which is a spiraling and circularly rotating airflow. As the craft moves forward, these vortices trail off behind the craft.

When hovering with a forward diagonal crosswind, or moving in a forward diagonal direction, the spinning vortices trailing off the main rotor blades will align with the rotation of the tail rotor and cause an instability in flight control.

When the trailing vortices colliding with the tail rotor are rotating in the same direction, this causes a loss of thrust from the tail rotor. When the trailing vortices rotate in the opposite direction of the tail rotor, thrust is increased. Use of the foot pedals is required to adjust the tail rotor's angle of attack, to compensate for these instabilities.

These issues are due to the exposed tail rotor cutting through open air around the rear of the vehicle. This issue disappears when the tail is instead ducted, using an internal impeller enclosed in the tail and a jet of high pressure air sideways out of the tail, as the main rotor vortices can not impact the operation of an internal impeller.

=== Critical wind azimuth ===
For a standard helicopter with a single main rotor, maintaining steady flight with a crosswind presents an additional flight control problem, where strong crosswinds from certain angles will increase or decrease lift from the main rotors. This effect is also triggered in a no-wind condition when moving the craft diagonally in various directions, depending on the direction of main rotor rotation.

This can lead to a loss of control and a crash or hard landing when operating at low altitudes, due to the sudden unexpected loss of lift, and insufficient time and distance available to recover.

=== Transmission ===
Conventional rotary-wing aircraft use a set of complex mechanical gearboxes to convert the high rotation speed of gas turbines into the low speed required to drive main and tail rotors. Unlike powerplants, mechanical gearboxes cannot be duplicated (for redundancy) and have always been a major weak point in helicopter reliability. In-flight catastrophic gear failures often result in gearbox jamming and subsequent fatalities, whereas loss of lubrication can trigger onboard fire. Another weakness of mechanical gearboxes is their transient power limitation, due to structural fatigue limits. Recent EASA studies point to engines and transmissions as prime cause of crashes just after pilot errors.

By contrast, electromagnetic transmissions do not use any parts in contact; hence lubrication can be drastically simplified, or eliminated. Their inherent redundancy offers good resilience to single point of failure. The absence of gears enables high power transient without impact on service life. The concept of electric propulsion applied to helicopter and electromagnetic drive was brought to reality by Pascal Chretien who designed, built and flew world's first man-carrying, free-flying electric helicopter. The concept was taken from the conceptual computer-aided design model on 10 September 2010 to the first testing at 30% power on 1 March 2011 – less than six months. The aircraft first flew on 12 August 2011. All development was conducted in Venelles, France.

In addition to regulatory measures, helicopter operators are also supported by voluntary safety teams that analyze accident data and promote specific countermeasures. In the United States, for example, the U.S. Helicopter Safety Team (USHST) publishes accident reviews and safety enhancements that address issues such as loss of control in flight, inadvertent flight into instrument meteorological conditions (IIMC), and low-altitude operations, encouraging improvements in training, operational decision-making, and the use of safety-enhancing technologies.

=== Hazards ===
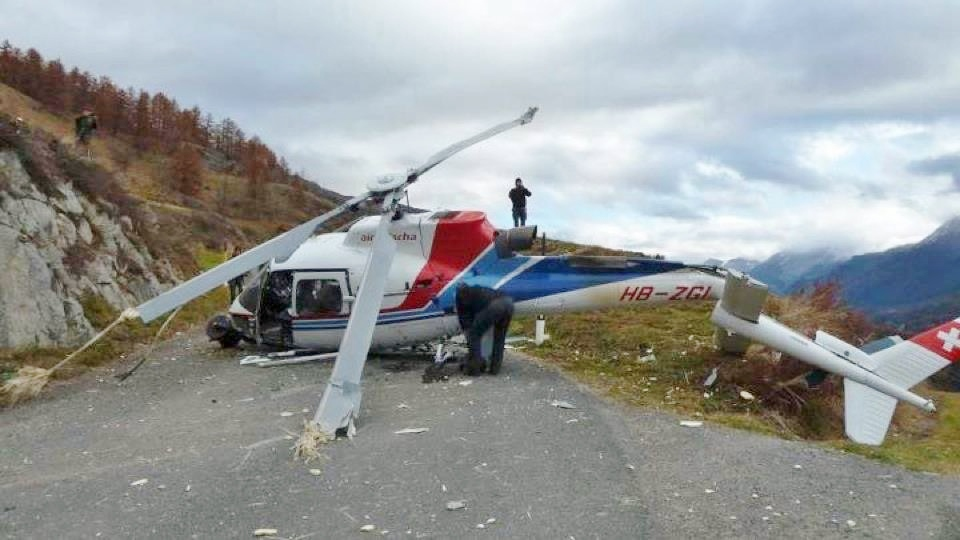
A Eurocopter AS350, destroyed after its main rotor struck the side of a mountain while at low altitude

As with any moving vehicle, unsafe operation could result in loss of control, structural damage, or loss of life. The following is a list of some of the potential hazards for helicopters:

- Settling with power is when the aircraft has insufficient power to arrest its descent. This hazard can develop into vortex ring state if not corrected early.
- Vortex ring state is a hazard induced by a combination of low airspeed, high power setting, and high descent rate. Rotor-tip vortices circulate from the high pressure air below the rotor disk to low pressure air above the disk, so that the helicopter settles into its own descending airflow. Adding more power increases the rate of air circulation and aggravates the situation. It is sometimes confused with settling with power, but they are aerodynamically different.
- Retreating blade stall is experienced during high speed flight and is the most common limiting factor of a helicopter's forward speed.
- Ground resonance is a self-reinforcing vibration that occurs when the lead/lag spacing of the blades of an articulated rotor system becomes irregular.
- Low-G condition is an abrupt change from a positive G-force state to a negative G-force state that results in loss of lift (unloaded disc) and subsequent roll over. If aft cyclic is applied while the disc is unloaded, the main rotor could strike the tail causing catastrophic failure.
- Dynamic rollover in which the helicopter pivots around one of the skids and 'pulls' itself onto its side (almost like a fixed-wing aircraft ground loop).
- Powertrain failures, especially those that occur within the shaded area of the height–velocity diagram.
- Tail rotor failures which occur from either a mechanical malfunction of the tail rotor control system or a loss of tail rotor thrust authority, called "loss of tail-rotor effectiveness" (LTE).
- Brownout in dusty conditions or whiteout in snowy conditions. (Also known as dustballs & snowballs respectively)
- Low rotor RPM, is when the engine cannot drive the blades at sufficient RPM to maintain flight.
- Rotor overspeed, which can over-stress the rotor hub pitch bearings (brinelling) and, if severe enough, cause blade separation from the aircraft.
- Wire and tree strikes due to low altitude operations and take-offs and landings in remote locations.
- Controlled flight into terrain in which the aircraft is flown into the ground unintentionally due to a lack of situational awareness.
- Mast bumping in some helicopters

=== List of fatal crashes ===
Deadliest helicopter crashes by death toll
Date	Operator	Aircraft	Event and location	Death toll
19 August 2002	Russia	Mil Mi-26	Shot down over Chechnya	127
9 December 1982	Nicaragua	Mil Mi-8	Shot down by Sandinistan rebels while carrying 88 people. All 84 passengers were killed and all four crew members survived.	84
4 February 1997	Israel	Sikorsky CH-53 Sea Stallion (x2)	Collision over Israel	73
14 December 1992	Russia (Russian Air Force)	Mil Mi-8	Shot down by Georgian forces in Abkhazia using SA-14 MANPADs, despite heavy escort. Three crew and 58 passengers, composed of mainly Russian refugees.	61
4 October 1993	Georgia	Mil Mi-8	Shot down when transporting 60 refugees from eastern Abkhazia; all on board were killed.	60
10 May 1977	Israel	CH-53	Crash near Yitav in the Jordan Valley	54
8 January 1968	United States	Sikorsky CH-53A Sea Stallion, USMC	Crash near Đông Hà Combat Base in South Vietnam. All five crew and 41 passengers were killed.	46
11 July 1972	United States	Sikorsky CH-53D Sea Stallion, USMC	Shot down by missile near Quảng Trị in South Vietnam. Six U.S. Marines and 50 Vietnamese Marines on board. Three U.S. Marines and 43 Vietnamese Marines were killed.	46
11 September 1982	United States	Boeing CH-47 Chinook, U.S. Army	Crash at an air show in Mannheim, then located in West Germany.	46
6 November 1986	British International Helicopters	Boeing 234LR Chinook	Crash in the Shetland Islands	45
28 January 1992	Azerbaijan	Mil Mi-8	Shootdown	44
3 July 2009	Pakistan (Pakistan Army)	Mil Mi-17	Crash	41
6 August 2011	United States	CH-47 Chinook	Shootdown, Afghanistan	38
18 August 1971	United States	CH-47 Chinook, U.S. Army	Crash near Pegnitz, then located in West Germany. All four crew and 33 passengers were killed.	37
26 January 2005	United States	Sikorsky CH-53E Super Stallion, USMC	Crash landed near Ar Rutbah, Iraq	31

== World records ==
Record type	Record	Helicopter	Pilot(s)	Date	Location	Note	Ref.
Speed	400.87 km/h (249.09 mph)	Westland Lynx	John Trevor Egginton (UK)	11 August 1986	UK		
Distance without landing	3,561.55 km (2,213.04 mi)	Hughes YOH-6A	Robert G. Ferry (USA)	6 April 1966	United States		
Around-the-world speed	136.7 km/h (84.9 mph)	Agusta A109S Grand	Scott Kasprowicz (USA)	18 August 2008	From and to New York City via Europe, Russia, Alaska, Canada	No in-flight refueling	
Highest altitude without payload	12,442 m (40,820 ft)	Aerospatiale Lama	Jean Boulet (France)	21 June 1972	France		
Highest level flight altitude	11,010 m (36,120 ft)	Sikorsky CH-54 Tarhe	James K. Church	4 November 1971	United States		
Altitude with 40-tonne payload	2,255 m (7,398 ft)	Mil V-12	Vasily Kolochenko, et al.	6 August 1969	USSR		
Highest takeoff (turbine)	8,848 m (29,029 ft)	Eurocopter AS350	Didier Delsalle	14 May 2005	Nepal	Mount Everest	
Highest takeoff (piston)	4,300.7 m (14,110 ft)	Robinson R44	Mark Young	12 October 2009	United States	Pike's Peak, Colorado	
First manned electric flight	Purely electric hover	Solution F Prototype	Pascal Chretien	12 August 2011	France	Venelles	
Longest human-powered lift	Pedalling, lift 64 s endurance, 3.3 m height; diagonal width: 46.9 m	AeroVelo Atlas, 4 rotors	Todd Reichert	13 June 2013	Canada	Indoor soccer stadium; Igor I. Sikorsky Competition winner	

== See also ==
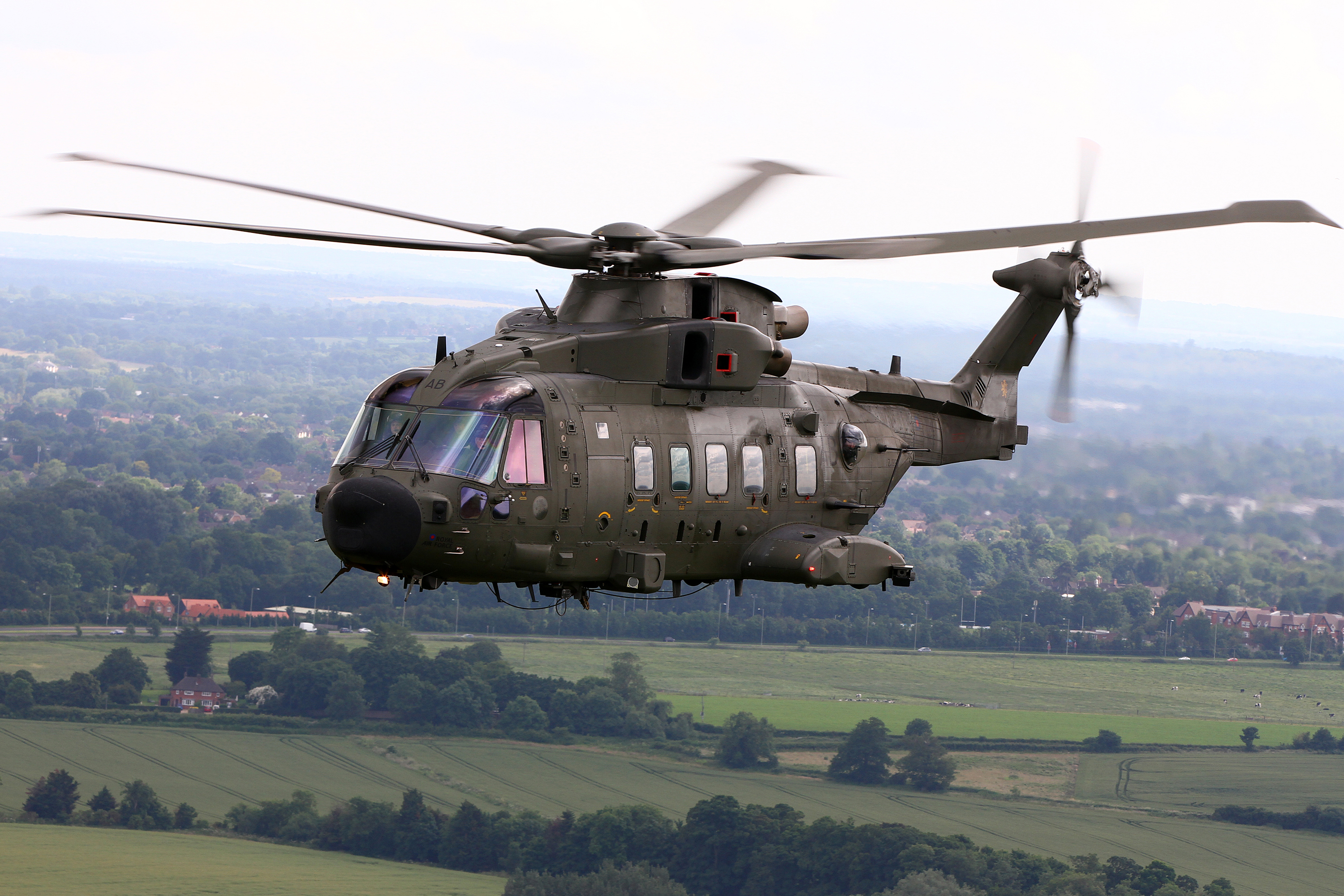
RAF Merlin HC3A Helicopter

- Attack helicopter
- Backpack helicopter
- Cyclogyro
- Disk loading
- Helicopter dynamics
- Helicopter height–velocity diagram
- Helicopter manufacturer
- Helicopter Underwater Escape Training
- Jesus nut, the top central big nut that holds the rotor on
- List of helicopter airlines
- List of rotorcraft
- Transverse flow effect
- Utility helicopter
- Wire strike protection system
- Tiltrotor

	Aerostat	Aerodyne		
	Lift: Lighter than air gas	Lift: Fixed wing	Lift: Unpowered rotor	Lift: Powered rotor
Unpowered free flight	(Free) balloon	Glider	Helicopter, etc. in autorotation	(None – see note 2)
Tethered (static or towed)	Tethered balloon	Kite	Rotor kite	(None – see note 2)
Powered	Airship	Airplane, ornithopter, etc.	Autogyro	Gyrodyne, helicopter
