= Translational lift =

Forward flight lift in a helicopter

Translational lift is improved rotor efficiency resulting from directional flight in a helicopter. Translation is the conversion from the hover to forward flight. As undisturbed air enters the rotor system horizontally, turbulence and vortices created by hovering flight are left behind and the flow of air becomes more horizontal. The efficiency of the hovering rotor system is greatly improved with each knot of airspeed gained by horizontal movement of the aircraft or wind speed.

As forward airspeed increases, the helicopter goes through effective translational lift (ETL) at about 16 to 24 knots. This is known as the ETL speed. Above this speed, the rotor system completely outruns the recirculation of old vortices and begins to work in undisturbed air. Efficiency continues to increase with airspeed until the best climb airspeed is reached, and drag is minimised.

This additional lift can enable an overloaded helicopter to climb even if it is too heavy to hover in ground effect. Liftoff can still be achieved if the helicopter has enough of a straight runway to make a "running take off", where the pilot will accelerate the helicopter across the ground on its landing gear until translational lift speed is achieved and the aircraft begins to climb. This is described in Robert Mason's book Chickenhawk.

During the translation from the hover to forward flight, the difference in lift across the rotor disc causes a difference in drag, resulting in a noticeable vibration between approximately 10-20 knots.

As speed increases and translational lift becomes more effective, the helicopter will tend to pitch up and roll to the right or left (depending on main rotor rotation direction), due to dissymmetry of lift, gyroscopic precession, and the transverse flow effect. The pilot must anticipate and correct for these effects.

The efficiency of the tail rotor is also improved with forward airspeed. This is known as translational thrust.

== See also ==
- Ground effect (aerodynamics)
- Transverse flow effect
- Dissymmetry of lift
- Vortex ring
- Vortex ring state
