= Transverse flow effect =

Helicopter aerodynamic effect

Transverse flow effect is an aerodynamic effect encountered when a helicopter moves horizontally (typically forward) through the air, which causes the rotor disc to roll to the side. It is also known as transverse roll or inflow roll.

Transverse flow effect is not experienced when hovering, because the air above the rotor disc is being pulled down from above (known as induced flow or downwash), and is equally distributed around the rotor disc. The air is descending from above, which has the effect of reducing angle of attack.

However, when the helicopter starts moving into undisturbed air, a portion of the disc is in clean, unaccelerated air, while the remaining portion of the rotor disc is still working on descending air. The part of the disc working on clean air therefore sees a higher angle of attack than the portion of the disc which is working on descending air. The result is that the portion in clean air develops more lift.

The disc rolls to the side, rather than pitching backwards as one might naively expect, because of phase lag. Phase lag is a property of all rotating systems acted upon by a periodic force, which causes the extra lift to be seen up to 90 degrees later in rotor rotation. For systems hinged at the axis of rotation, such as a semi-rigid rotorhead, the phase lag is 90 degrees. For systems that are hinged at some distance from the axis of rotation, such as an articulated rotorhead, the phase lag is less than 90 degrees. In forward flight the pilot will experience either a right or left roll, depending upon whether the rotor of the helicopter rotates counter-clockwise or clockwise respectively. Some sources attribute the roll to gyroscopic precession, however this is not correct: gyroscopic precession always results in a shift of 90 degrees, whereas phase lag can be less than 90 degrees. Gyroscopic precession applies only to rigid systems, but helicopter rotors are not rigid as they are designed to flap up and down.

If a helicopter experiences a crosswind, the transverse flow effect will result in a pitching up or down instead of a roll.

At higher airspeeds, more and more of the rotor disc will be in clean air and the lift differential will decrease, however transverse flow effect will be experienced to some extent across the whole flight envelope. In a typical single rotor helicopter, the effect is greatest just before Effective Translational Lift (ETL).

The difference in lift between the front and rear of the rotor disc also causes a difference in drag, resulting in a vibration between approximately 10-20 knots. However some sources attribute this to ETL rather than transverse flow.
