= Vuia 1 =

Vuia No. 1
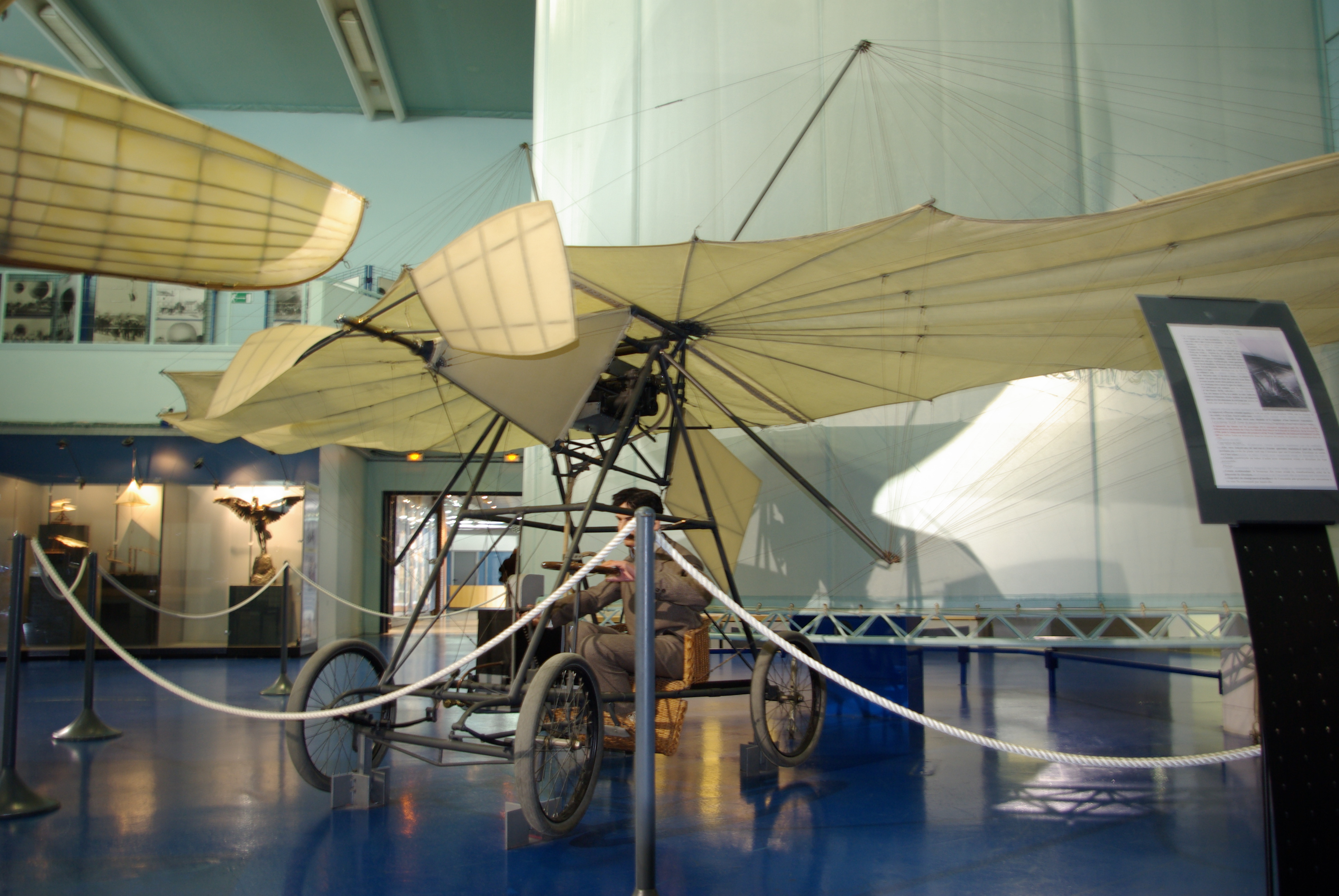
- Replica of the Vuia 1 at Musée de l'Air et de l'Espace

General information
- Type: Experimental aircraft
- Manufacturer: Ateliers Hockenjos & Schmitt
- Designer: Traian Vuia
- Number built: 1

History
- First flight: 18 March 1906

The Vuia 1, also nicknamed Liliacul (the bat), was a pioneer aircraft designed and built by Romanian inventor Traian Vuia. It was finished in December 1905 in France and first flew on 18 March 1906 at Montesson.

== Background ==
After finishing his studies, Traian Vuia continued to study the problem of flying, and began building his first aircraft, which he called the Aeroplan Automobil. Being short of funds, Vuia left for Paris in June 1902, hoping he could find someone interested in funding his project.

Once there, Vuia met Georges Besançon, the founder of the aeronautical journal L'Aérophile. With his help, Vuia managed to go through the vast documentation and fundamental works regarding aeronautics. Using the knowledge from other aviation pioneers such as George Cayley, Clément Ader, Samuel Langley and Otto Lilienthal, he presented a document to the Académie des Sciences on 16 February 1903. However, his project was rejected with the response that "The problem of flight with a machine which weighs more than air can not be solved and it is only a dream."

Refusing to give up, he applied for a French patent on 15 May 1903. The patent (No. 332106) was issued on 17 August and published on 16 October, the same year.

== Construction and design ==
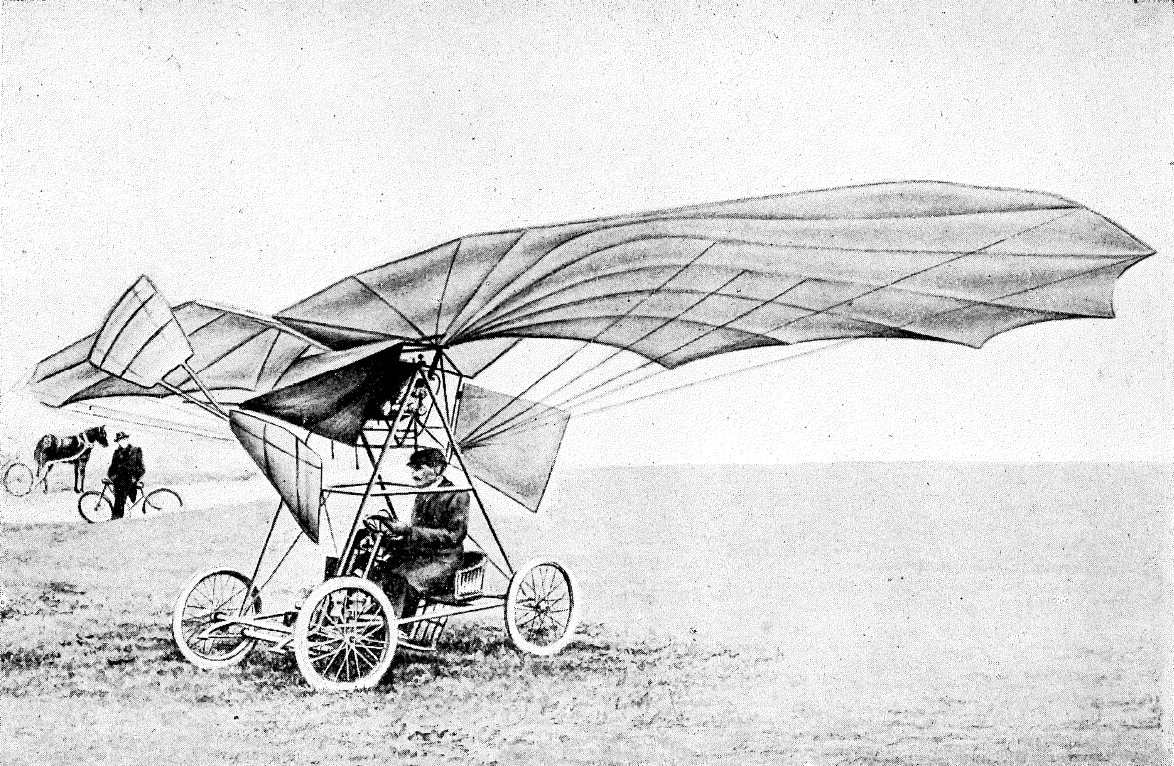
The Vuia 1 aircraft

Not being able to find an engine for his airplane, he visited Victor Tatin, then addressed automobile manufactures Clément-Bayard and Buchet, the latter of which provided the engine for the Santos-Dumont number 6 airship. Neither being able to help him with the engine, Vuia asked for help from Gheorghe Dobrin and together with other members of the Romanian community in Paris like Coriolan Brediceanu and Marius Sturza, enough funds were gathered for the engine.

Initially, he managed to find an engine at Courbevoie, however its manufacturer was insolvent and Vuia lost the money. Inspired by this engine, Vuia designed an engine which was powered by liquid carbon dioxide. He submitted the patent on 14 November 1904, receiving it on 30 May 1905 (No. 349493). With a recommendation from Besançon, Vuia got into contact with an automobile mechanic, Hockenjos, and construction of the aircraft started at the Hockenjos & Schmitt workshops. After initial construction of the aircraft was completed in February 1905, Vuia continued talks with Victor Tatin, who agreed to manufacture the propeller.

In August of the same year, Vuia bought a Serpollet engine which he modified after his design. The aircraft was finished in December 1905, with Ernest Archdeacon, Alberto Santos-Dumont and Victor Tatin being present during the mounting of the engine.

=== Design ===
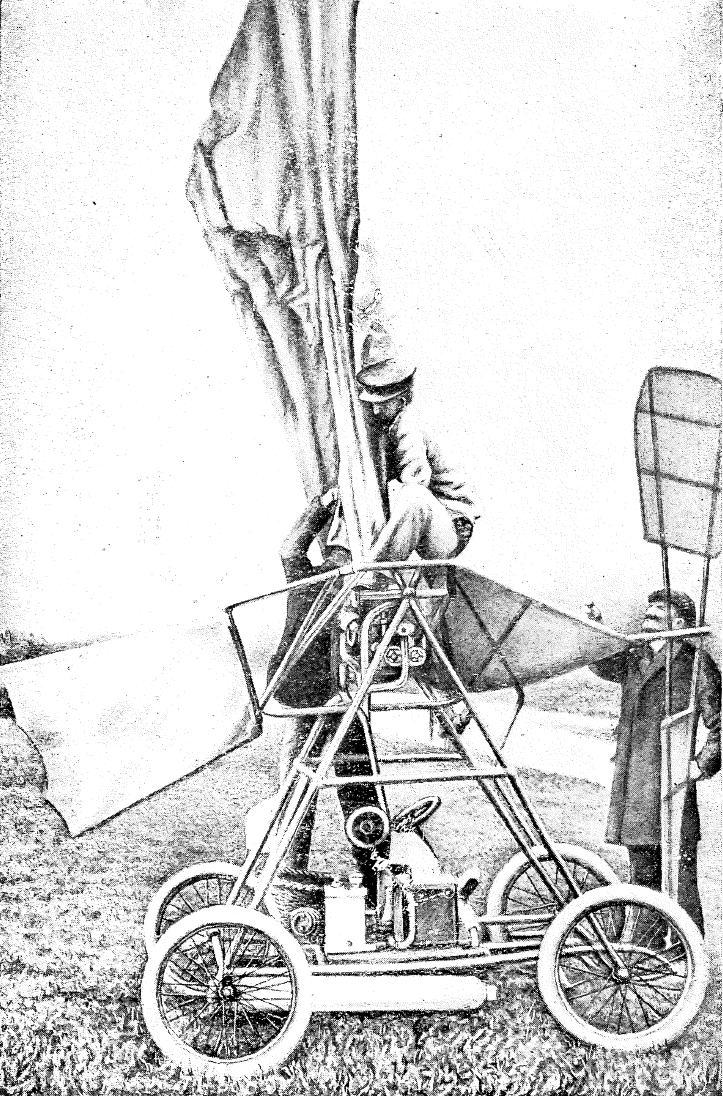
Vuia 1 with its wings folded

The Vuia 1 was a parasol monoplane, its wings being attached to the upper part of a mobile metal frame which, together with the fixed lower chassis, made up the skeleton of the machine. The two wings could be folded and made up like an umbrella so that the plane could travel on the ground and be parked. The upper frame carried the engine, the airscrew and the rudder. The lower chassis had four wheels with pneumatic tires, the front wheels having shock-absorbing springs.

On the lower chassis the following components of the engine were mounted: the generator (a boiler which vaporized the carbonic acid gas), the acid gas tank, the kerosene tank (the burning of which was giving the necessary vaporizing temperature), the rudder and engine control devices, as well as the pilot seat. The link between the lower chassis and the upper frame was ensured by a set of four steel tubes, starting above each wheel and joined in a tip end, forming two triangles on each side. Between the tips of these triangles a steel tube, which in a horizontal plane was perpendicular to the flight path, supported the upper frame and the wings. This way the transversal tube became an axis around which the system formed by the upper frame and the wings was oscillating, allowing the variation of the angle of incidence while in flight, thus playing the role of an elevator. Hence, Traian Vuia was the first in the world to build wings with variable incidence during flight, an idea taken up later by other aircraft constructors.

== Flights ==
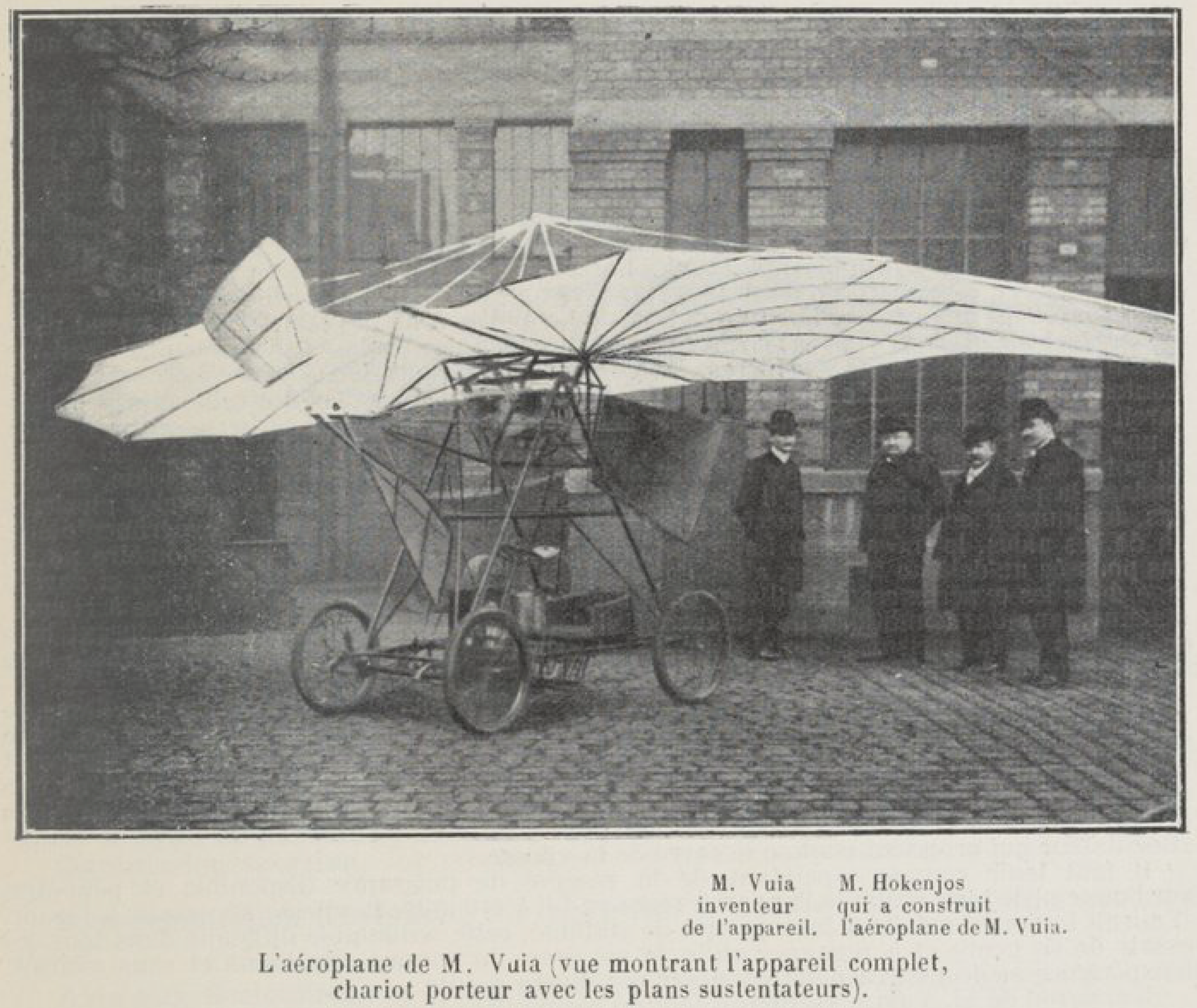
Traian Vuia and M. Hockenjos with Vuia's airplane, from L'Aérophile February 1906

After the aircraft was finished in December 1905, Vuia first tested it on the ground, going with 40 km/h without using the full power of the engine. In February 1906, Vuia made the first test of the aircraft without the wings on a road at Montesson. The test was watched by Georges Besançon, duke and viscount Decazes, Gustave Hermite, Albert de Masfrand, journalists and photographers. The news of his aircraft was published the next day in France and Britain.

On 6 March, it was decided to mount the wings. On 18 March 1906, at 3.05 p.m., while in the presence of Hockenjos, Tiefenbacher, Watelet and mechanic Lallemand, the Vuia 1 lifted off the ground and flew at a height of about 1 m (3.3 ft) for about 12 m (39 ft) before the engine stopped. The aircraft, moved by the wind, hit a tree while coming down, damaging its wing and propeller.

On 6 May, Vuia flew again, however this flight was interrupted when a wing mount detached and damaged the canvas. The wing was quickly fixed with a white patch being added over the damaged part. Following this flight, Vuia would start looking for a new place to carry out his tests, obtaining the approval to use the military field at Issy-les-Moulineaux only on Sundays.

The first flight on the new field took place on 24 June, during which several short hops were achieved. On 1 July several more, longer hops, were achieved. Following this attempt, Vuia brought new modifications to his machine, which would be named Vuia 1-bis.

=== Vuia 1-bis ===
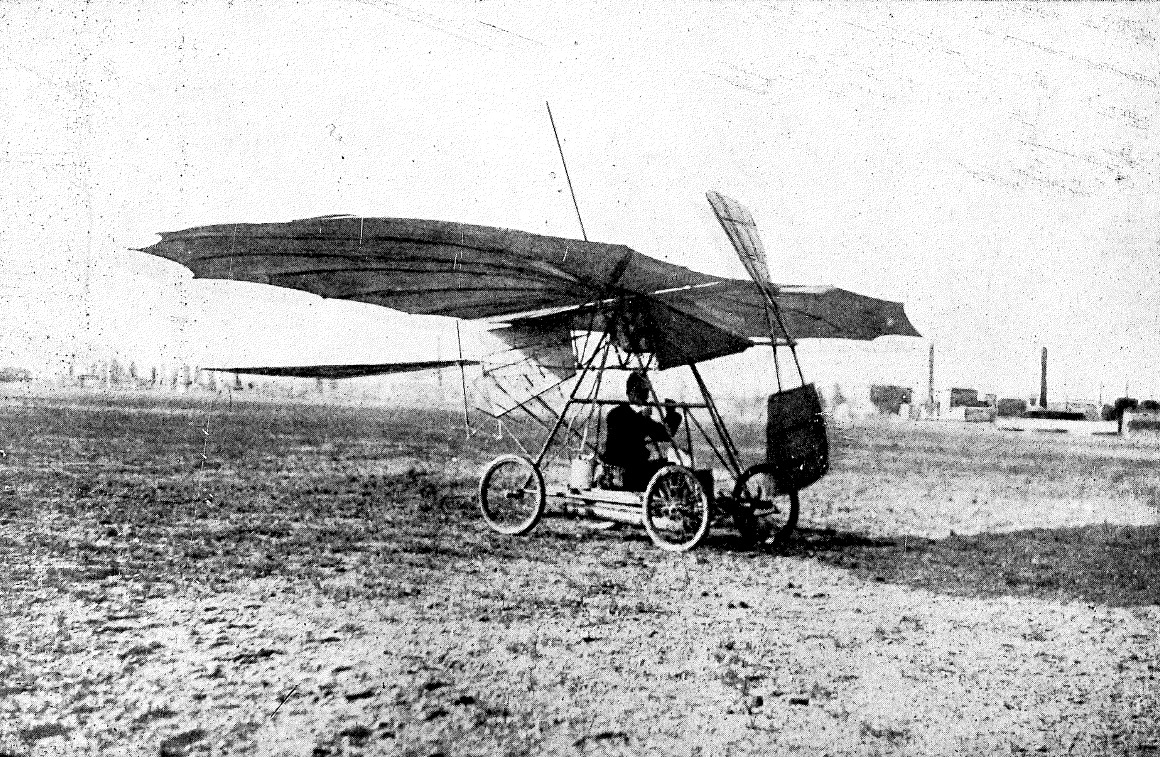
The Vuia I-bis

After some successive changes, Vuia completed the upgrades in August. The wings of this machine had a smaller wing camber and an orientable stabilizer, improving the aerodynamic qualities of the plane. The angle of incidence was no longer adjusted in flight, being fixed before takeoff. The efficiency of the engine was also improved by increasing the airscrew's speed to 930 turns per minute. During the experiments the weight of the machine was changed several times. Initially planned to have 240 kg, the weight of the machine eventually reached 275 kg.

On 19 August a longer hop of 24 m (79 ft) at a height of about 2.5 m (8.2 ft) was made, ending in a heavy landing which damaged the propeller. Following this test, the other aviation pioneers started to pay more attention to Vuia's flights, and will resort to Vuia's solution of launching their machines directly on wheels.

The flight tests on 7 and 14 October were the first with an official presence. The control of the results being carried out by Ernest Archdeacon and Édouard Surcouf. An accident, however, would put a stop to other tests in 1906, with Vuia also being unable to enroll in the Aéro-Club de France and participate in Archdeacon's Grand Prix due to monetary problems.

Vuia would carry out more tests on his Vuia 1-bis until 30 March 1907. However these were not more successful than the previous ones, Vuia giving up on the carbon dioxide engine and instead building an aircraft powered by a 25 hp Antoinette engine, the Vuia 2.

== Legacy ==
It does not matter who has made a thing. What is important is that it exists, that it has been made. I have never pursued glory, because I know that glory often ruins a man. I do not work for my personal glory, I work for the glory of mankind.

— Traian Vuia

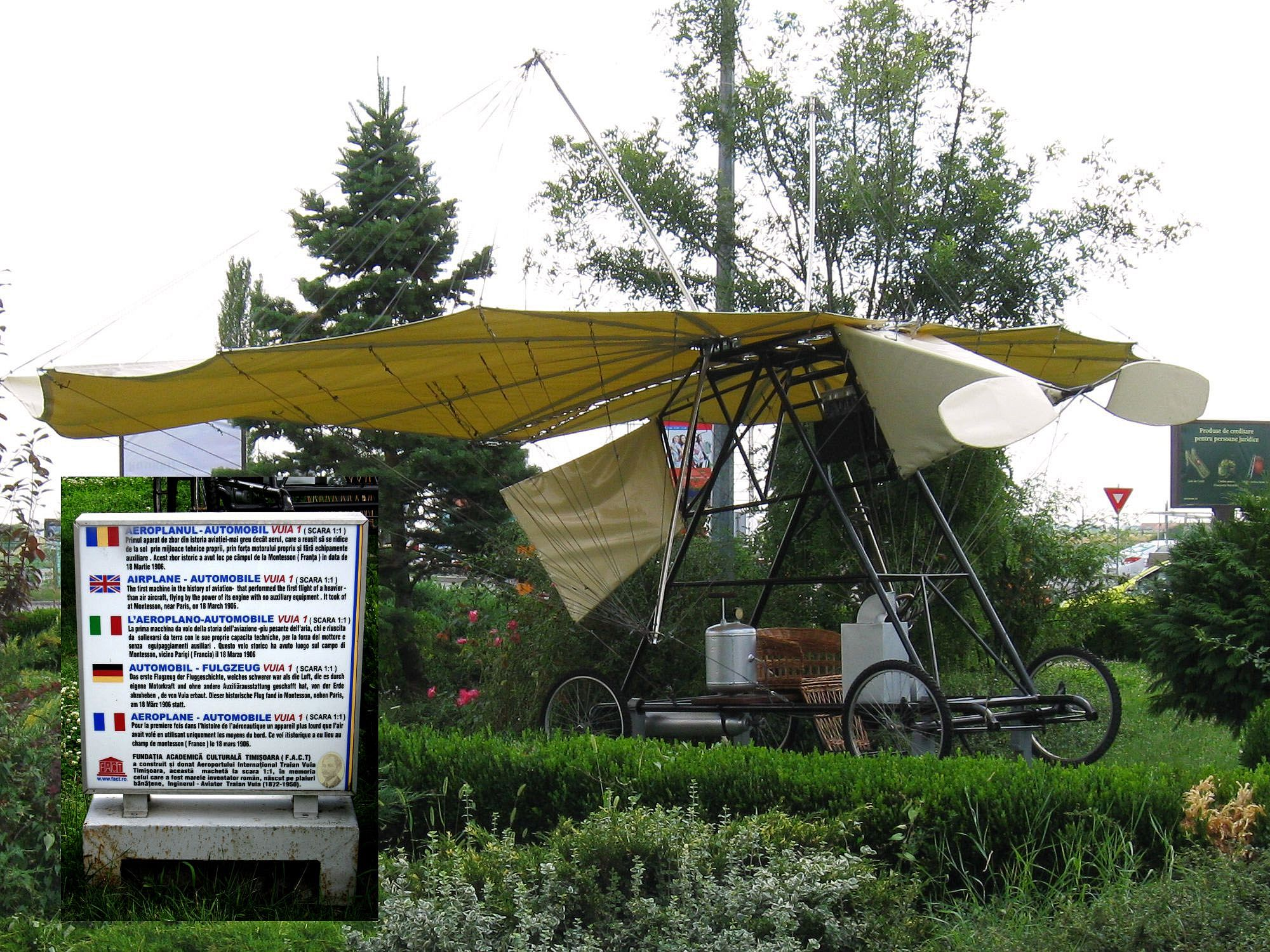
The FACT Vuia 1 replica at the Timișoara International Airport

Vuia's tests were followed with attention by other aviation pioneers such as Ernest Archdeacon, Louis Blériot, Gabriel Voisin, Ferdinand Ferber and Alberto Santos-Dumont. According to Charles Dollfus, former curator of the Air Museum in Paris, Santos-Dumont's use of wheels on his aircraft was influenced by seeing Vuia's flight attempts. Vuia's monoplane design also inspired Blériot in designing monoplanes.

In 2006, a working replica of Vuia's airplane was built to celebrate 100 years since his first flight. The replica was built by the Timișoara Academic Cultural Foundation (FACT) and was powered by a 25 hp Rotax engine. It was on display for a few days in Timișoara, then it was displayed at Montesson then taken on a tour through several European cities. The airplane was presented with its engine running without any flight attempts.

== Specifications (Vuia 1) ==
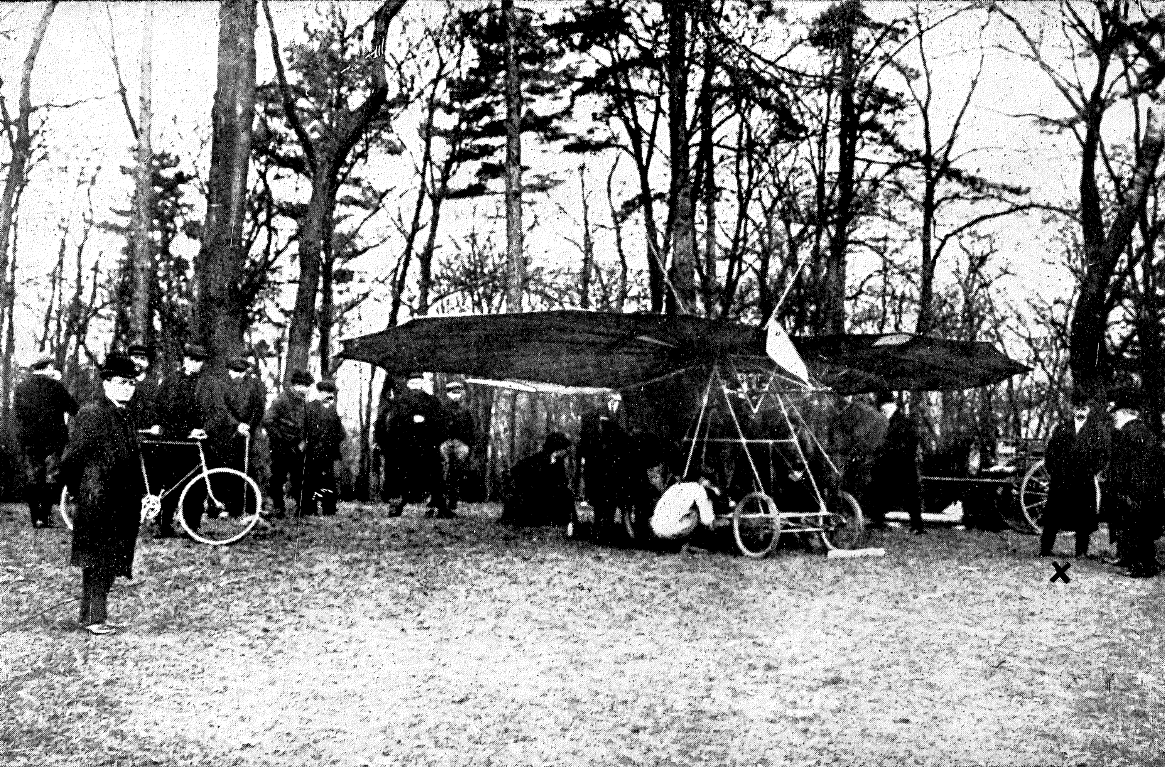
Vuia's airplane in 1906, Santos-Dumont is present on the right (Note: Also notice the white patch on the wing)

Data from Romanian Aeronautical Constructions 1905-1974, L'Aérophile

General characteristics

- Crew: 1
- Length: 3.20 m (10 ft 6 in)
- Wingspan: 8.70 m (28 ft 7 in)
- Height: 2.90 m (9 ft 6 in)
- Wing area: 20 m^{2} (220 sq ft)
- Empty weight: 195 kg (430 lb)
- Max takeoff weight: 241 kg (531 lb)
- Fuel capacity: 13 liters
- Powerplant: 1 × Vuia modified Serpollet carbonic acid powered, 15 kW (20 hp)
- Propellers: 2-bladed propeller designed by Victor Tatin, 2.20 m (7 ft 3 in) diameter

== See also ==
- Santos-Dumont 14-bis
- Louis Blériot
- Jacob Ellehammer
- Wright brothers
- Otto Lilienthal
