= 1906 in aviation =

This is a list of aviation-related events from 1906:

== Events ==
=== January–December ===
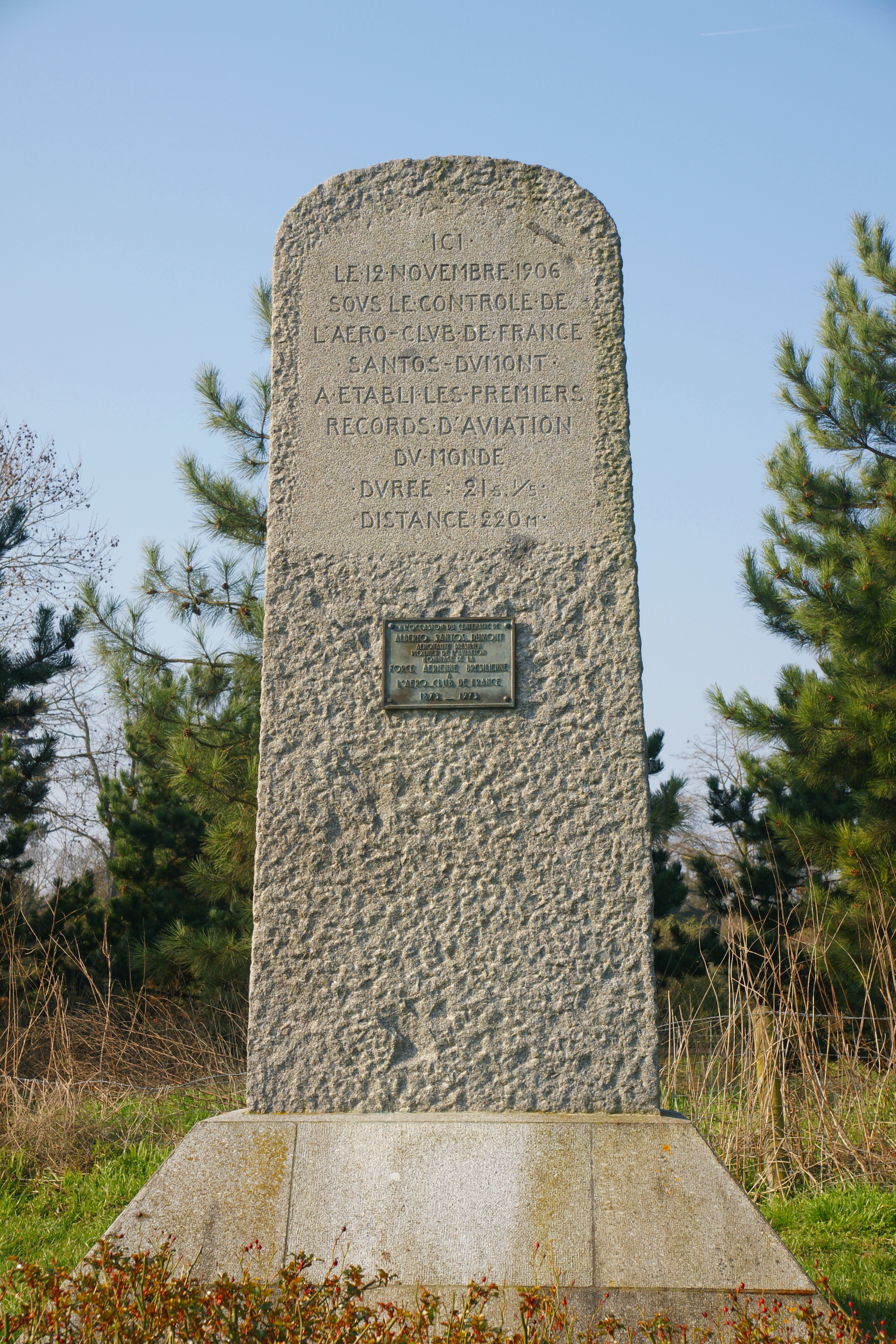
The monument at the Château de Bagatelle to Santos-Dumont's flight on 12 November 1906.

- 17 January – The Zeppelin LZ2 makes its first flight, which ends in a forced landing.
- 18 January – The Zeppelin LZ2 is destroyed in high winds.
- 27 February – American aviation pioneer Samuel Pierpont Langley dies at Aiken, South Carolina.
- 5 March – Romanian inventor Traian Vuia begins testing his Vuia 1 at Montesson, France, by driving it as an automobile without its wings mounted. It is a high-wing monoplane powered by a carbonic acid gas engine, and is first aircraft with pneumatic tires.
- 18 March – At Montesson, Traian Vuia achieves several short hops in his Vuia 1, traveling about 12 meters (39 feet) at an altitude of about 1 meter (3.3 feet). He flies four more times; one flight travels some 20 meters (66 feet) at an altitude of 1 meter (3.3 feet), and the longest flight is 24 meters (79 feet), the first manned flights of a heavier-than-air monoplane with an unassisted takeoff.
- April 10 – Charles Frederick Page was granted the first patent for an aircraft in the United States.
- 11 August – Mrs. C.J. Miller becomes the first American woman to ride as a passenger in a dirigible.
- September – A military balloon is flown over Stonehenge in England carrying out the first aerial photography in archaeology.
- 12 September – Jacob Ellehammer makes a tethered flight with his aeroplane "Semi-biplane" on the tiny island of Lindholm. The plane was attached to the ground by a rope and described a few circles.
- 13 September – Alberto Santos-Dumont successfully flies his Santos-Dumont 14-bis aircraft for the first time, on the grounds of the Château de Bagatelle in the Bois de Boulogne public park in Paris.
- 30 September – The Gordon Bennett Cup in ballooning is awarded for the first time. It goes to Lieutenant Frank Lahm of the United States Army, who flies 647 km (402 mi) in the balloon United States from Paris to Fylingdales Moor in North Yorkshire, England. It is the first international balloon race.
- 9 October – The Zeppelin LZ 3 flies for the first time, making a 60-mile (97 km) round trip in two hours.
- 23 October – Alberto Santos-Dumont wins the Archdeacon Prize as for a flight of 60 m (200 ft) in his Santos-Dumont 14-bis at the Château de Bagatelle's grounds.
- November – Brothers Gabriel and Charles Voisin open an aircraft factory in Billancourt, France, beginning the Voisin company.
- 12 November – Alberto Santos-Dumont flies 722 feet (220 m) in 21 seconds at the Château de Bagatelle's grounds in the Santos-Dumont 14-bis which has been recently equipped with primitive interplane ailerons. This is recorded as the first officially observed aeroplane flight in Europe and, although occurring after longer flights by the Wright brothers in the United States, is the first officially recognized airplane distance record.
- 16 November – The first flight of the French Lebaudy-built semi-rigid airship Patrie takes place.
