= Radiosonde =

Meteorological instrumentation

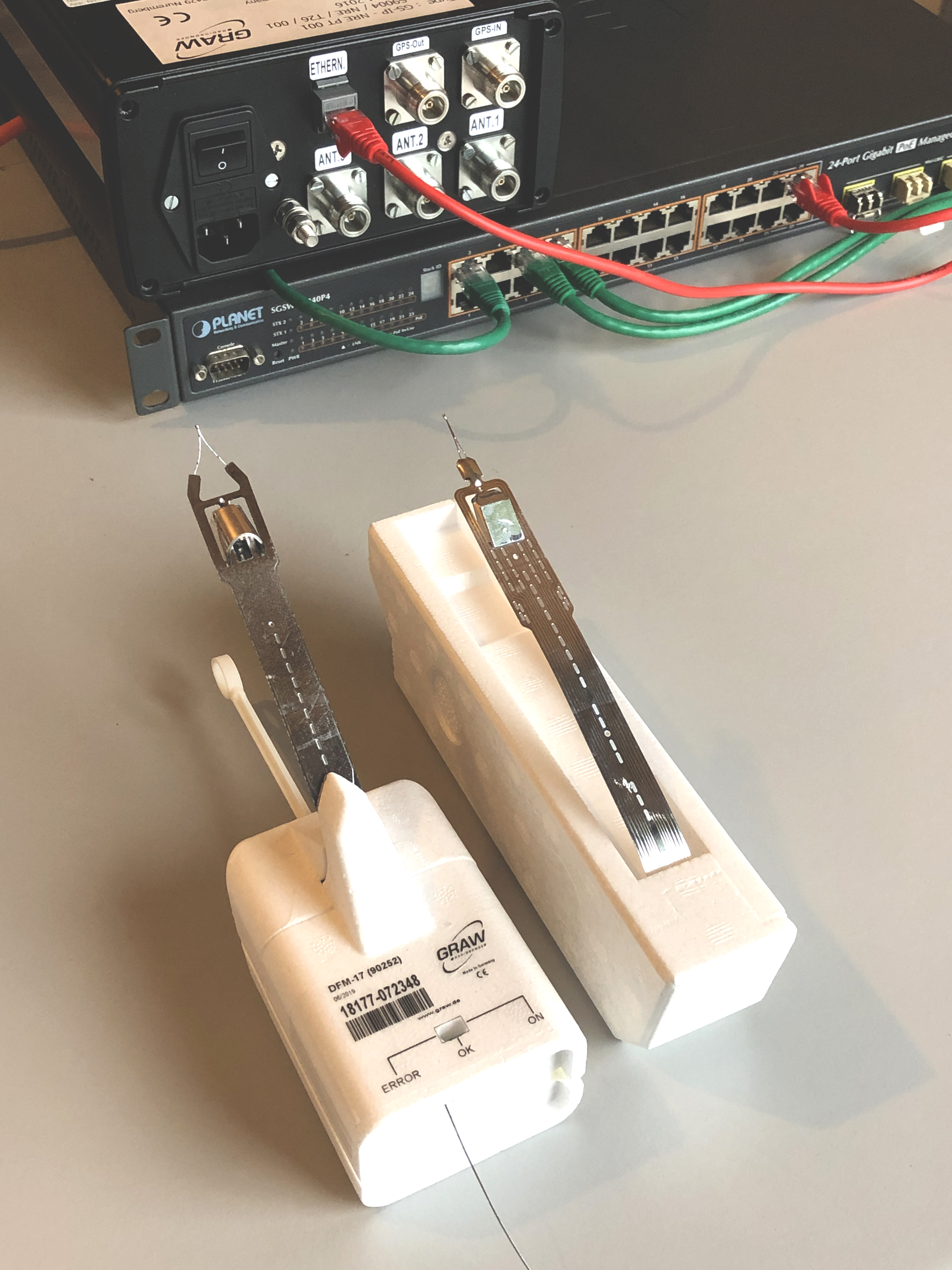
Modern radiosondes showing progress of miniaturisation

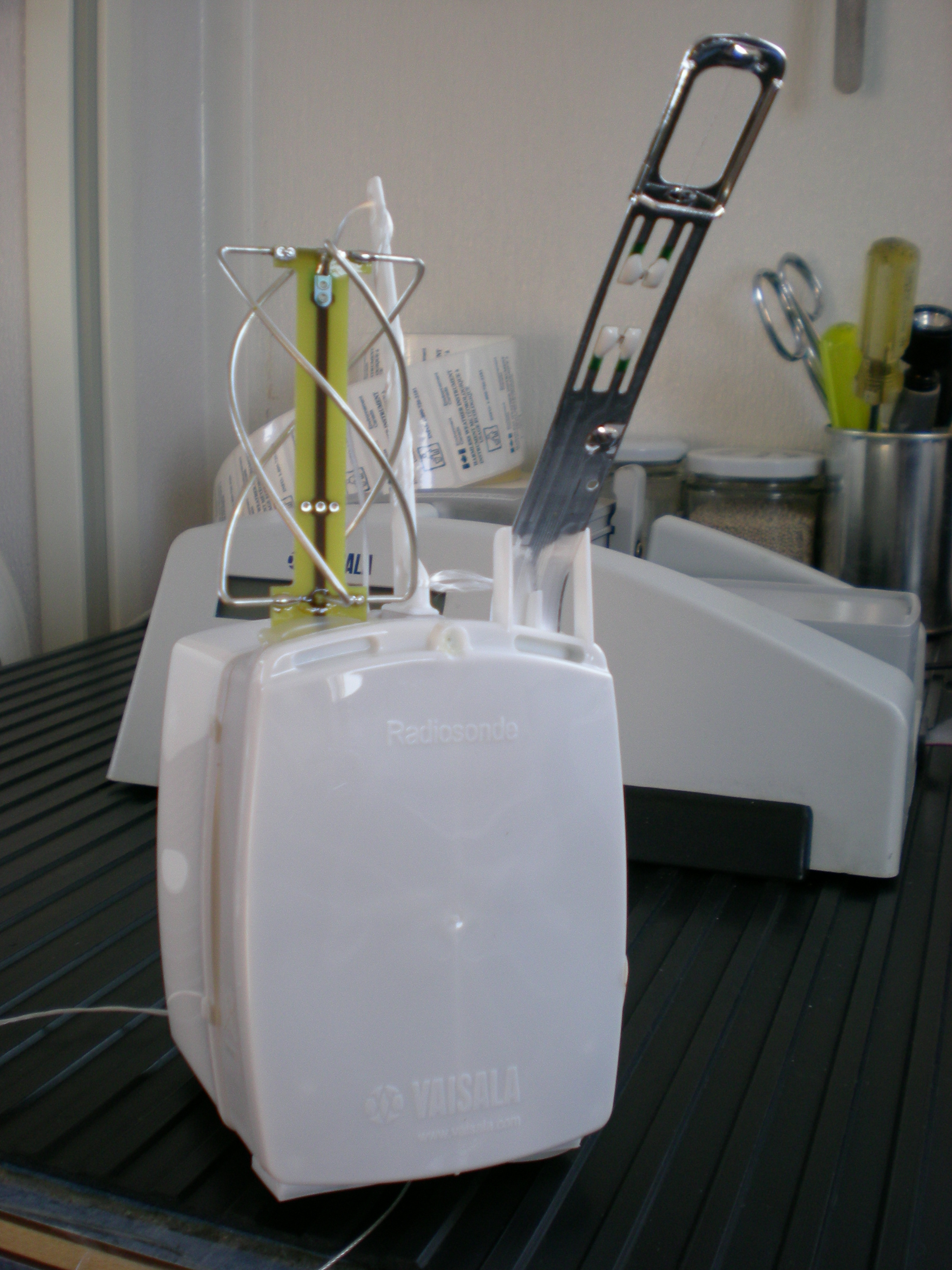
A GPS sonde, approx 220 × 80 ×75 mm (8.7 × 3.1 × 3 in) (with grounding station in the background, used to perform a 'ground check' and also recondition the humidity sensor)

A radiosonde is a battery-powered telemetry instrument carried into the atmosphere usually by a weather balloon that measures various atmospheric parameters and transmits them by radio to a ground receiver. Modern radiosondes measure or calculate the following variables: altitude, pressure, temperature, relative humidity, wind (both wind speed and wind direction), cosmic ray readings at high altitude and geographical position (latitude/longitude). Radiosondes measuring ozone concentration are known as ozonesondes.

Radiosondes may operate at a radio frequency of 403 MHz or 1680 MHz. A radiosonde whose position is tracked as it ascends to give wind speed and direction information is called a rawinsonde ("radar wind -sonde"). Most radiosondes have radar reflectors and are technically rawinsondes. A radiosonde that is dropped from an airplane and falls, rather than being carried by a balloon is called a dropsonde. Radiosondes are an essential source of meteorological data, and hundreds are launched all over the world daily.

== History ==
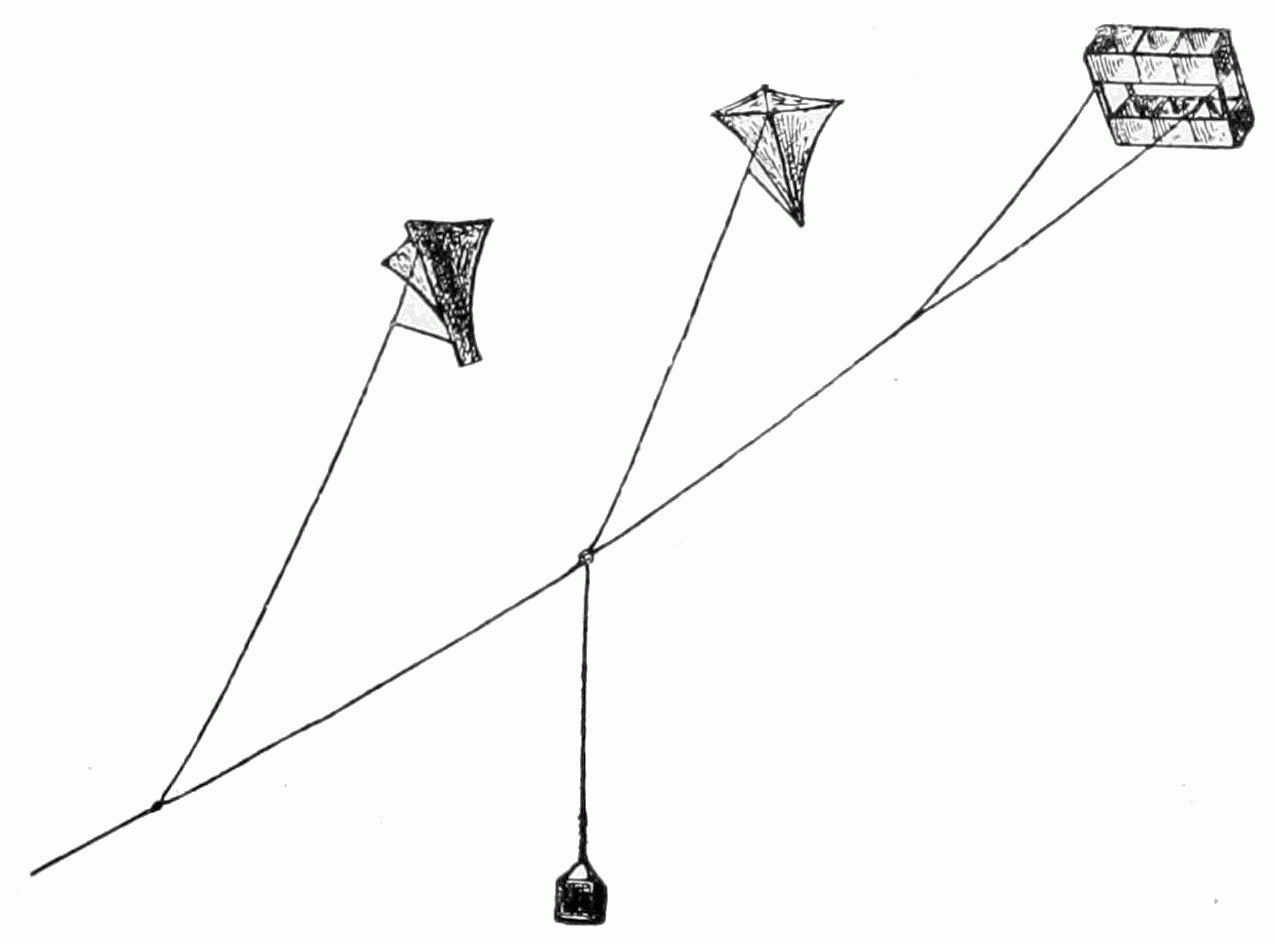
Kites used to fly a meteograph

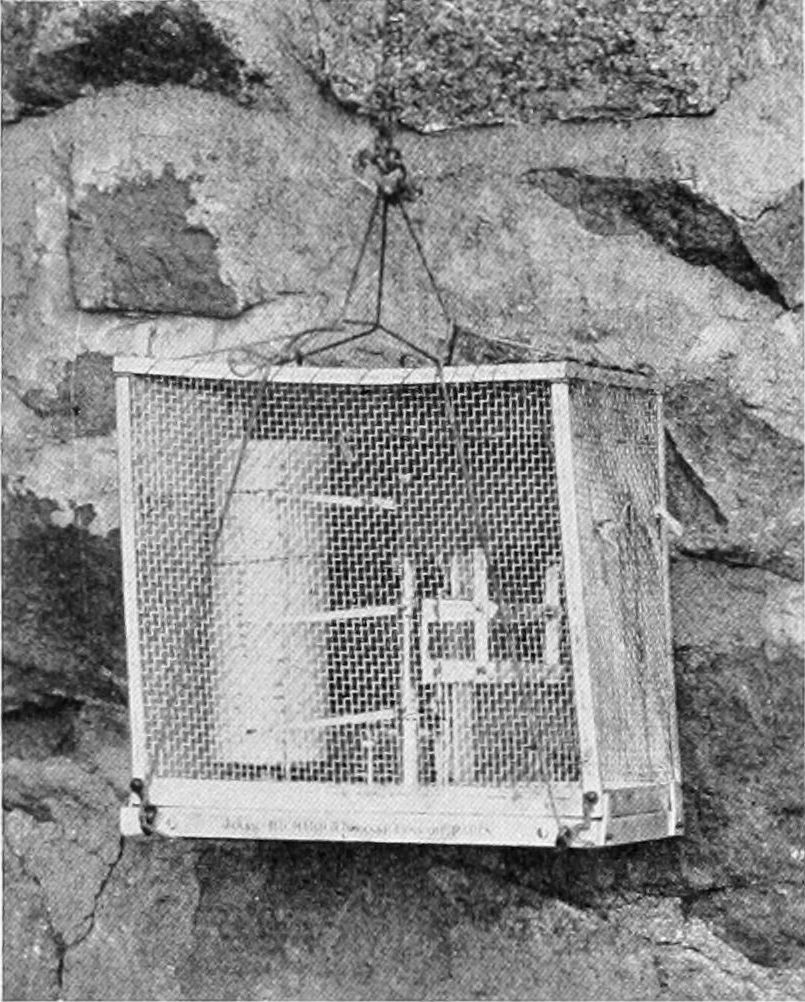
Meteograph used by the US Weather Bureau in 1898

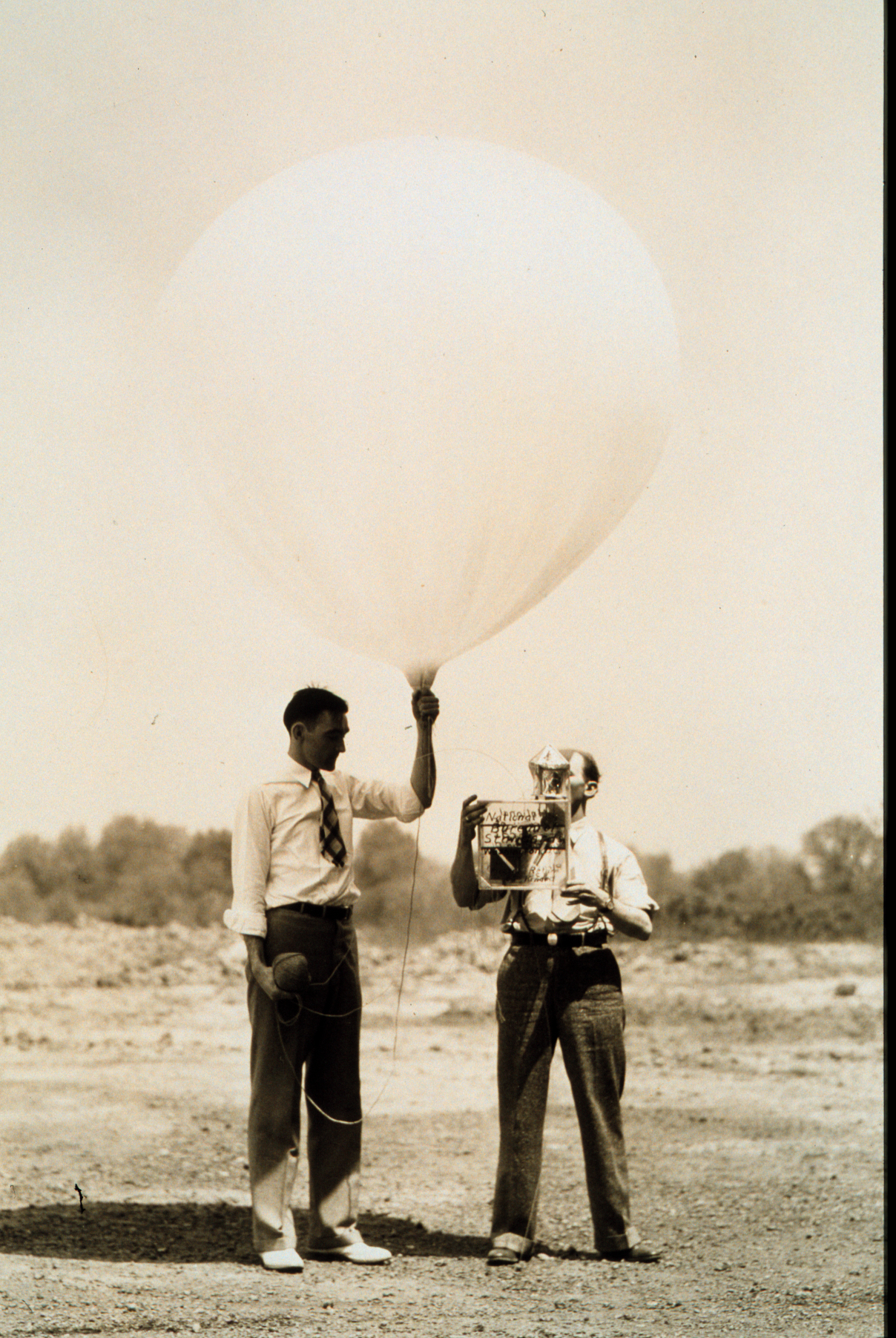
U.S. Bureau of Standards personnel launch radiosonde near Washington, DC in 1936

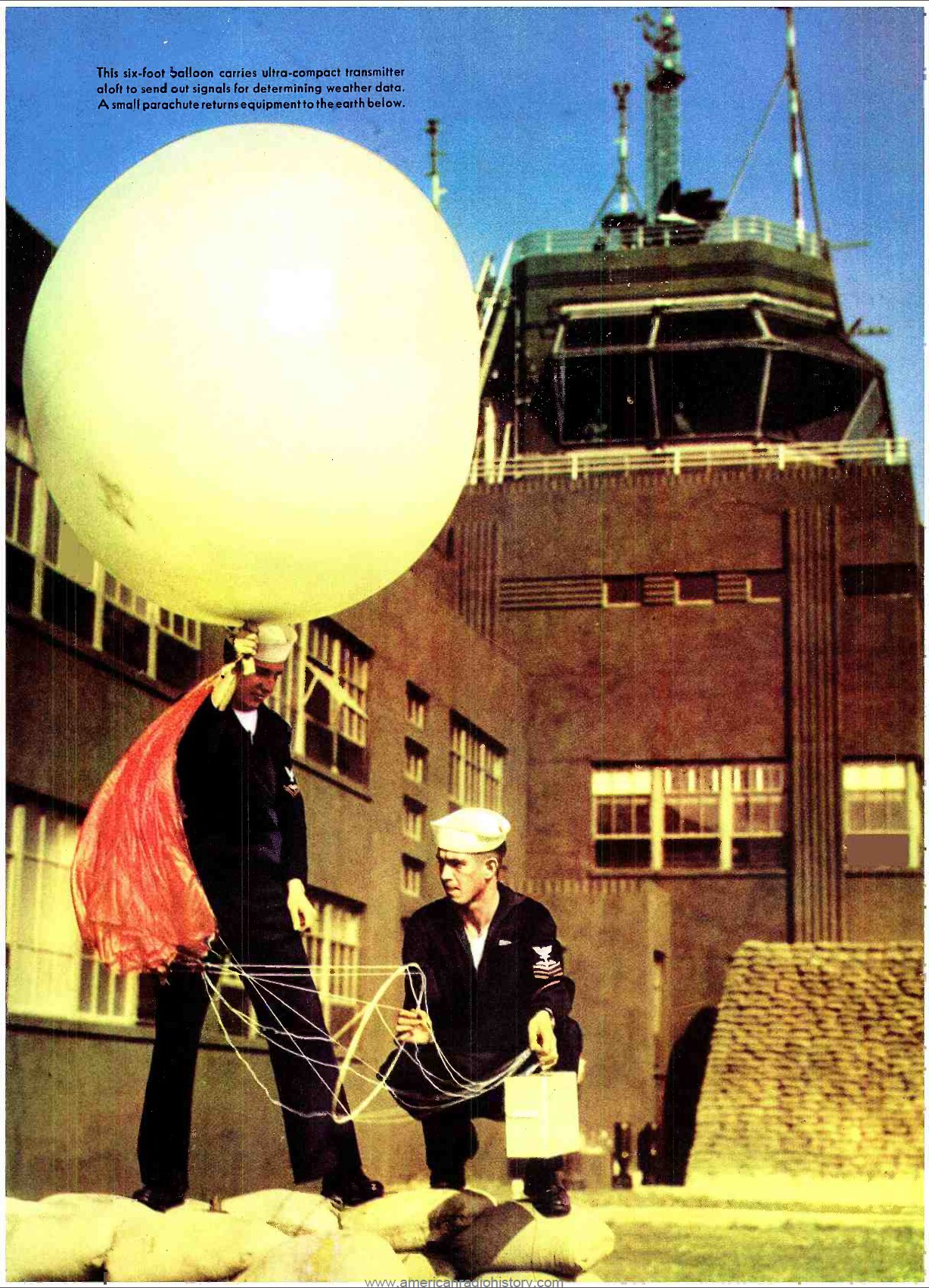
US sailors launching a radiosonde during World War 2

The first flights of aerological instruments were done in the second half of the 19th century with kites and meteographs, a recording device measuring pressure and temperature that would be recovered after the experiment. This proved difficult because the kites were linked to the ground and were very difficult to manoeuvre in gusty conditions. Furthermore, the sounding was limited to low altitudes because of the link to the ground.

Gustave Hermite and Georges Besançon, from France, were the first in 1892 to use a balloon to fly the meteograph. In 1898, Léon Teisserenc de Bort organized at the Observatoire de Météorologie Dynamique de Trappes the first regular daily use of these balloons. Data from these launches showed that the temperature lowered with height up to a certain altitude, which varied with the season, and then stabilized above this altitude. De Bort's discovery of the tropopause and stratosphere was announced in 1902 at the French Academy of Sciences. Other researchers, like Richard Aßmann and William Henry Dines, were working at the same times with similar instruments.

In 1924, Colonel William Blaire in the U.S. Signal Corps did the first primitive experiments with weather measurements from balloon, making use of the temperature dependence of radio circuits. The first true radiosonde that sent precise encoded telemetry from weather sensors was invented in France by Robert Bureau. Bureau coined the name "radiosonde" and flew the first instrument on January 7, 1929. Developed independently a year later, Pavel Molchanov flew a radiosonde on January 30, 1930. Molchanov's design became a popular standard because of its simplicity and because it converted sensor readings to Morse code, making it easy to use without special equipment or training.

Working with a modified Molchanov sonde, Sergey Vernov was the first to use radiosondes to perform cosmic ray readings at high altitude. On April 1, 1935, he took measurements up to 13.6 km (8.5 mi) using a pair of Geiger counters in an anti-coincidence circuit to avoid counting secondary ray showers. This became an important technique in the field, and Vernov flew his radiosondes on land and sea over the next few years, measuring the radiation's latitude dependence caused by the Earth's magnetic field.

In 1936, the U.S. Navy assigned the U.S. Bureau of Standards (NBS) to develop an official radiosonde for the Navy to use. The NBS gave the project to Harry Diamond, who had previously worked on radio navigation and invented a blind landing system for airplanes. The organization led by Diamond eventually (in 1992) became a part of the U.S. Army Research Laboratory. In 1937, Diamond, along with his associates Francis Dunmore and Wilbur Hinmann, Jr., created a radiosonde that employed audio-frequency subcarrier modulation with the help of a resistance-capacity relaxation oscillator. In addition, this NBS radiosonde was capable of measuring temperature and humidity at higher altitudes than conventional radiosondes at the time due to the use of electric sensors.

In 1938, Diamond developed the first ground receiver for the radiosonde, which prompted the first service use of the NBS radiosondes in the Navy. Then in 1939, Diamond and his colleagues developed a ground-based radiosonde called the “remote weather station,” which allowed them to automatically collect weather data in remote and inhospitable locations. By 1940, the NBS radiosonde system included a pressure drive, which measured temperature and humidity as functions of pressure. It also gathered data on cloud thickness and light intensity in the atmosphere. Due to this and other improvements in cost (about $25), weight (> 1 kilogram), and accuracy, hundreds of thousands of NBS-style radiosondes were produced nationwide for research purposes, and the apparatus was officially adopted by the U.S. Weather Bureau.

Diamond was given the Washington Academy of Sciences Engineering Award in 1940 and the IRE Fellow Award (which was later renamed the Harry Diamond Memorial Award) in 1943 for his contributions to radio-meteorology.

The expansion of economically important government weather forecasting services during the 1930s and their increasing need for data motivated many nations to begin regular radiosonde observation programs

In 1985, as part of the Soviet Union's Vega program, the two Venus probes, Vega 1 and Vega 2, each dropped a radiosonde into the atmosphere of Venus. The sondes were tracked for two days.

Although modern remote sensing by satellites, aircraft and ground sensors is an increasing source of atmospheric data, none of these systems can match the vertical resolution (30 m (98 ft) or less) and altitude coverage (30 km (19 mi)) of radiosonde observations, so they remain essential to modern meteorology.

Although hundreds of radiosondes are launched worldwide each day year-round, fatalities attributed to radiosondes are rare. The first known example was the electrocution of a lineman in the United States who was attempting to free a radiosonde from high-tension power lines in 1943. In 1970, an Antonov 24 operating Aeroflot Flight 1661 suffered a loss of control after striking a radiosonde in flight resulting in the death of all 45 people on board.

== Operation ==
A rubber or latex balloon filled with either helium or hydrogen lifts the device up through the atmosphere. The maximum altitude to which the balloon ascends is determined by the diameter and thickness of the balloon. Balloon sizes can range from 100 to 3,000 g (3.5 to 105.8 oz). As the balloon ascends through the atmosphere, the pressure decreases, causing the balloon to expand. Eventually, the balloon will expand to the extent that its skin will break, terminating the ascent. An 800 g (28 oz) balloon will burst at about 21 km (13 mi). After bursting, a small parachute on the radiosonde's support line may slow its descent to Earth, while some rely on the aerodynamic drag of the shredded remains of the balloon, and the very light weight of the package itself. A typical radiosonde flight lasts 60 to 90 minutes. One radiosonde from Clark Air Base, Philippines, reached an altitude of 155,092 ft (47,272 m).

The modern radiosonde communicates via radio with a computer that stores all the variables in real time. The first radiosondes were observed from the ground with a theodolite, and gave only a wind estimation by the position. With the advent of radar by the Signal Corps it was possible to track a radar target carried by the balloons with the SCR-658 radar. Modern radiosondes can use a variety of mechanisms for determining wind speed and direction, such as a radio direction finder or GPS. The weight of a radiosonde is typically 250 g (8.8 oz).

Sometimes radiosondes are deployed by being dropped from an aircraft instead of being carried aloft by a balloon. Radiosondes deployed in this way are called dropsondes.

== Routine radiosonde launches ==
Radiosondes weather balloons have conventionally been used as means of measuring atmospheric profiles of humidity, temperature, pressure, wind speed and direction. High-quality, spatially and temporally “continuous” data from upper-air monitoring along with surface observations are critical bases for understanding weather conditions and climate trends and providing weather and climate information for the welfare of societies. Reliable and timely information underpin society’s preparedness to extreme weather conditions and to changing climate patterns.

Worldwide, there are about 1,300 radiosonde launch sites. Most countries share data with the rest of the world through international agreements. Nearly all routine radiosonde launches occur one hour before the official observation times of 0000 UTC and 1200 UTC to center the observation times during the roughly two-hour ascent. Radiosonde observations are important for weather forecasting, severe weather watches and warnings, and atmospheric research.

The United States National Weather Service launches radiosondes twice daily from 92 stations, 69 in the conterminous United States, 13 in Alaska, nine in the Pacific, and one in Puerto Rico. It also supports the operation of 10 radiosonde sites in the Caribbean. A list of U.S. operated land based launch sites can be found in Appendix C, U.S. Land-based Rawinsonde Stations of the Federal Meteorological Handbook #3, titled Rawinsonde and Pibal Observations, dated May 1997.

The UK launches Vaisala RS41 radiosondes four times daily (an hour before 00, 06, 12, and 18 UTC) from 6 launch sites (south to north): Camborne, (lat, lon)=(50.218, -5.327), SW tip of England; Herstmonceux (50.89, 0.318), near SE coast; Watnall, (53.005, -1.25), central England; Castor Bay, (54.50, -6.34), near the SE corner of Lough Neagh in Northern Ireland; Albemarle, (55.02, -1.88), NE England; and Lerwick, (60.139, -1.183), Shetland, Scotland.

== Uses of upper air observations ==
Raw upper air data is routinely processed by supercomputers running numerical models. Forecasters often view the data in a graphical format, plotted on thermodynamic diagrams such as Skew-T log-P diagrams, Tephigrams, and or Stüve diagrams, all useful for the interpretation of the atmosphere's vertical thermodynamics profile of temperature and moisture as well as kinematics of vertical wind profile.

Radiosonde data is a crucially important component of numerical weather prediction. Because a sonde may drift several hundred kilometers during the 90- to 120-minute flight, there may be concern that this could introduce problems into the model initialization. However, this appears not to be so except perhaps locally in jet stream regions in the stratosphere. This issue may in future be solved by weather drones, which have precise control over their location and can compensate for drift.

Lamentably, in less developed parts of the globe such as Africa, which has high vulnerability to impacts of extreme weather events and climate change, there is paucity of surface- and upper-air observations. The alarming state of the issue was highlighted in 2020 by the World Meteorological Organisation which stated that "the situation in Africa shows a dramatic decrease of almost 50% from 2015 to 2020 in the number of radiosonde flights, the most important type of surface-based observations. Reporting now has poorer geographical coverage". Over the last two decades, some 82% of the countries in Africa have experienced severe (57%) and moderate (25%) radiosonde data gap. This dire situation has prompted call for urgent need to fill the data gap in Africa and globally. The vast data gap in such a large part the global landmass, home to some of the most vulnerable societies, the aforementioned call has galvanised a global effort to “plug the data gap” in the decade ahead and halt a further deterioration in the observation networks.

== International regulation ==
According to the International Telecommunication Union, a meteorological aids service (also: meteorological aids radiocommunication service) is – according to Article 1.50 of the ITU Radio Regulations (RR) – defined as "A radiocommunication service used for meteorological, including hydrological, observations and exploration. Furthermore, according to article 1.109 of the ITU RR:

A radiosonde is an automatic radio transmitter in the meteorological aids service usually carried on an aircraft, free balloon, kite or parachute, and which transmits meteorological data. Each radio transmitter shall be classified by the radiocommunication service in which it operates permanently or temporarily.

=== Frequency allocation ===
The allocation of radio frequencies is provided according to Article 5 of the ITU Radio Regulations (edition 2012).

In order to improve harmonisation in spectrum utilisation, the majority of service-allocations stipulated in this document were incorporated in national Tables of Frequency Allocations and Utilisations which is with-in the responsibility of the appropriate national administration. The allocation might be primary, secondary, exclusive, and shared.

- primary allocation: is indicated by writing in capital letters (see example below)
- secondary allocation: is indicated by small letters
- exclusive or shared utilization: is within the responsibility of administrations

However, military usage, in bands where there is civil usage, will be in accordance with the ITU Radio Regulations.

Example of frequency allocation

Allocation to services
Region 1	Region 2	Region 3
401-402 MHz METEOROLOGICAL AIDS SPACE OPERATION (space-to-Earth); EARTH EXPLORATION-SATELLITE (Earth-to-space); METEOROLOGICAL-SATELLITE (Earth-to-space); Fixed; Mobile except aeronautical mobile

== See also ==
- 6AK5
- Atmospheric model
- Atmospheric thermodynamics
- CTD (instrument)
- Global horizontal sounding technique
- Rocketsonde
- Totex - a Japanese manufacturer of meteorological balloons
- Vaisala
- Vilho Väisälä
- Water-activated battery
- Cricketsonde
