= Ellehammer triplane =

"Triplane"

General information
- Manufacturer: Jacob Ellehammer
- Designer: Jacob Ellehammer
- Number built: 1

History
- First flight: 1907

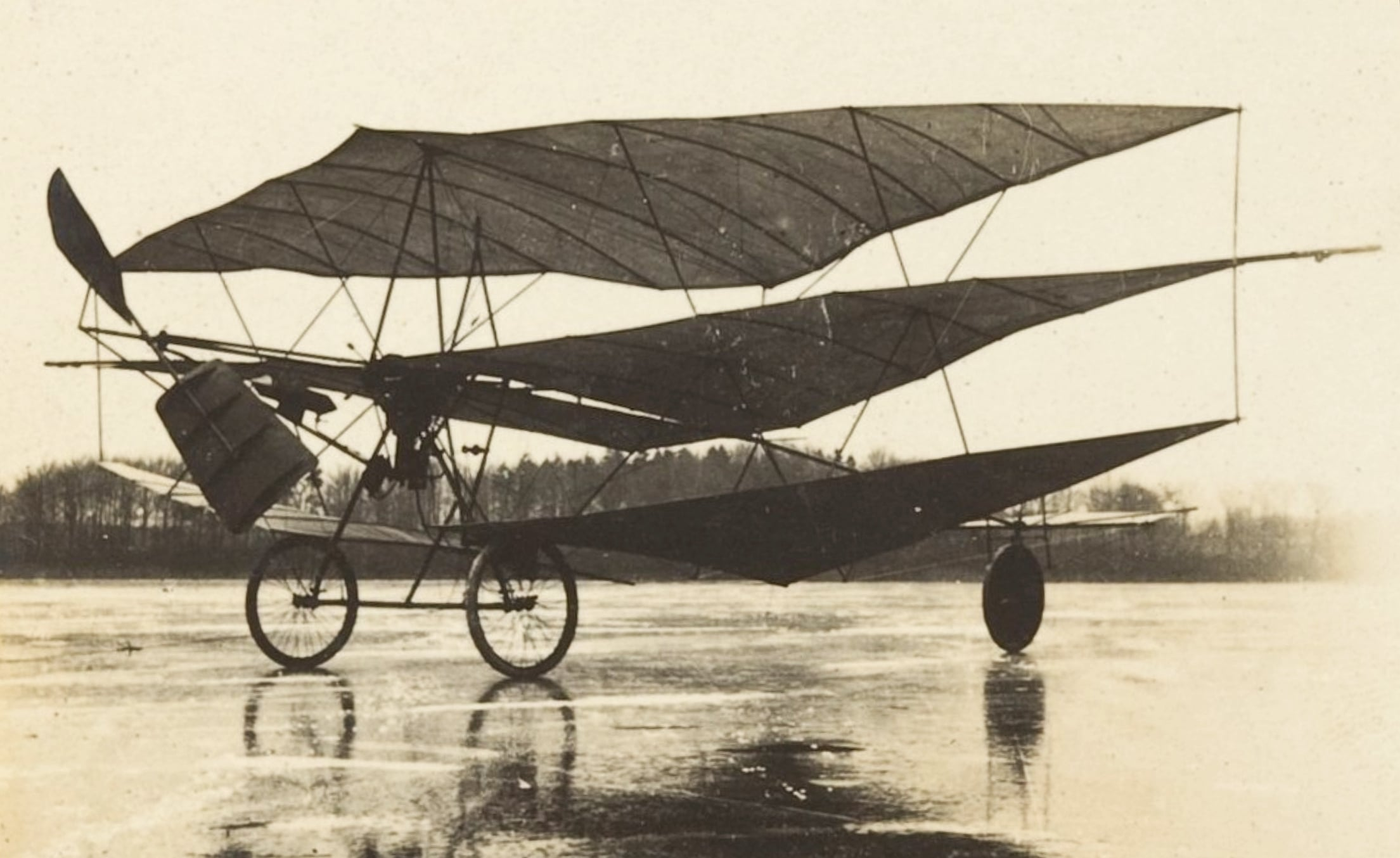
The Triplane prior to takeoff

The Ellehammer triplane was a pioneering aircraft built in Denmark in 1907. Unlike Ellehammer's semi-biplane of the previous year, this (otherwise unnamed) triplane was capable of making free, untethered flights. The aircraft featured three sets of triangular wings attached to an open tubular framework. The upper set was one continuous-span, but the lower sets were split and attached either side of the frame. A horizontal stabiliser was fitted aft of the frame. There were no conventional vertical stabilizers, however the covered tailwheel provided a very small amount of surface area for stability.

On 14 January 1908 Ellehammer achieved a flight in this machine of 175 m (574 ft) and on 13 February, one of 300 m (1,000 ft). Around this time, he also started making curved flights. In June, Ellehammer demonstrated the triplane in Kiel, where he was able to collect a M 5,000 prize from Prince Henry of Prussia for making a powered flight in Germany.

Data from Air Progress

General characteristics

- Crew: 1

Performance
