= 6AK5 =

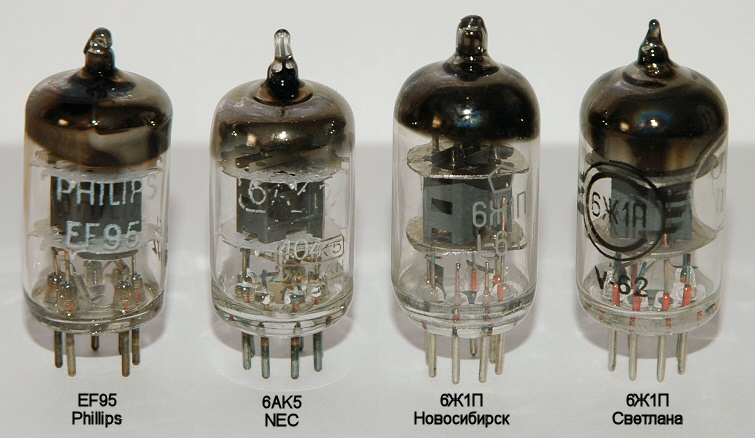
- 6AK5 vacuum tubes, from left to right: EF95 by Phillips, 6AK5 by NEC, 6Zh1P USSR (Novosibirsk), 6Zh1P USSR (Svetlana)
- Classification: Pentode
- Service: VHF RF amplifier
- Height: 1 3/4 in (44 mm)
- Diameter: 3/4 in (19 mm)

Cathode
- Cathode type: Unipotential
- Heater voltage: 6.3 V
- Heater current: 175 mA

Anode
- Max dissipation Watts: 1.7 W
- Max voltage: 180 V

Socket connections
- B7G

The 6AK5 vacuum tube is a miniature 7-pin sharp-cutoff pentode used as RF or IF amplifier especially in high-frequency wide-band applications at frequencies up to 400 MHz.

It was developed by Bell Labs / Western Electric and used extensively as an I.F. amplifier in World War II radar systems. The tube is notable for its extremely fine grid, and extremely close control grid to cathode spacing, yielding excellent high-frequency performance.

It is also known as EF95 under its Mullard–Phillips designation and was produced in the former Soviet Union as type 6Zh1P (Russian: 6Ж1П) under the Russian designation system.

A version of this tube with extended ratings was designated 6AK5W and 6Zh1P-EV (Russian: 6Ж1П-ЕВ) respectively.

Even though primarily intended for VHF amplification, the tube has found some use in audio applications as a microphone preamplifier, for instance in the LOMO 19A9 microphone, headphone amplifiers such as the Little Dot MKIII, and in guitar effects stompboxes, such as Metasonix TM-7 Scrotum Smasher.

The 6AK5 was used in some types of radiosonde (weather balloon payloads), in the 1960s and 70s. Because of the non-recoverable nature of the equipment, the single 6AK5 was soldered directly to the printed circuit board and served as the only active device in the circuit, performing the function of a low frequency modulation oscillator and the high frequency carrier oscillator and output stage.

== See also ==
- List of vacuum tubes
