= Cricketsonde =

1960s low-altitude and CO2 propelled meteorological rocket

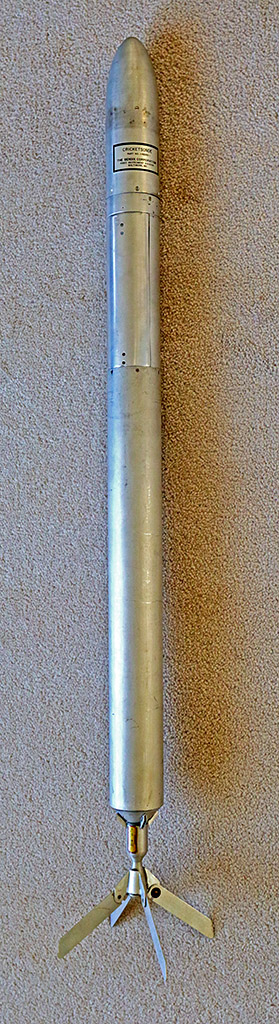
The Cricketsonde rocket vehicle (fins shown in deployed position)

A Cricketsonde (Cold Rocket Instrument Carrying Kit sonde) was a CO_{2} propelled, low-altitude meteorological rocket designed in the early 1960s by Texaco and the Friez Instrument Division of Bendix Corporation. It was used by various government and academic agencies until at least the late 1960s. The rocket carried what was essentially a radiosonde payload and was capable of reaching over 3,000 feet (910 meters), where it then ejected a parachute and sent telemetry about temperature, humidity and barometric pressure during descent. A ground station with a manually tracked antenna received the signal where the data was processed and recorded.

== Vehicle overview ==
The Cricketsonde rocket, made primarily of aluminum, was approximately 2.5 feet in length and 3 inches in diameter, and consisted of a propellant section, a recovery section, and a payload section. With the standard payload (telemetry package, battery and parachute), it weighed 5.5 lbs fully fueled. Depending on payload weight, the cricketsonde could achieve altitudes of over 3,700 feet (1,100 meters).

=== Propulsion section ===
A combination of acetone and liquid CO_{2} was used as the propellant. This mixture was used to control the thrust and thrust duration and was pumped into the rocket just before flight. The amount of fuel usually equated to about 2 seconds of thrust.

=== Telemetry and instrumentation section ===
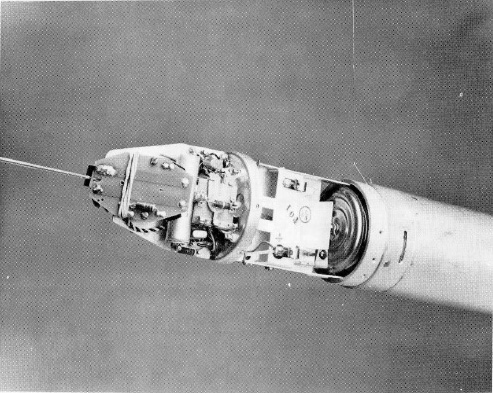
Cricketsonde Telemetry Package 01

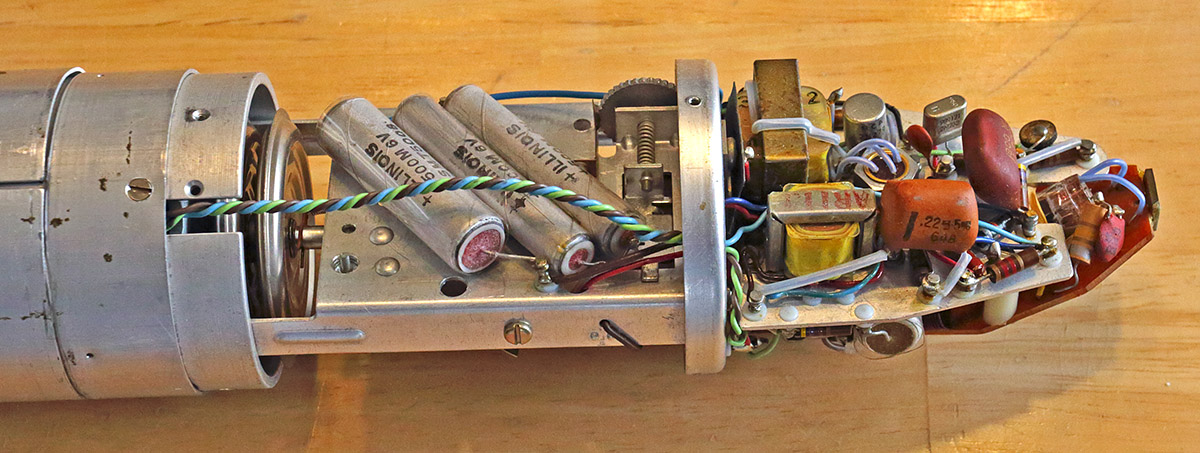
Nose section of the Cricketsonde rocket with nose cover removed. Telemetry and sensor electronics shown.

The telemetry package included a transmitter (operating on 403 MHz), blocking oscillator, pressure switch and battery. A multivibrator switched the temperature and humidity sensors into the circuit, while a baroswitch over-rode the multivibrator to transmit pressure readings.

The instrumentation consisted of a temperature, humidity and pressure sensors. The temperature sensor was a (at the time) standard ML-419 element, while the humidity sensor was a standard ML-476 carbon element. An aneroid-type baroswitch served as the pressure sensor. The temperature and humidity sensors were mounted in a vented housing attached to the parachute, which was exposed to the atmosphere when the parachute was ejected after apogee. Data sampling of temperature and humidity occurred approximately every 30 feet during decent, while pressure readings were taken about every 500 feet (150 meters).

Power was supplied by a water-activated battery (Ray-O-Vac BSC5), which was inserted just prior to flight. A removable cover on the nose cone provided access.

=== Recovery section ===
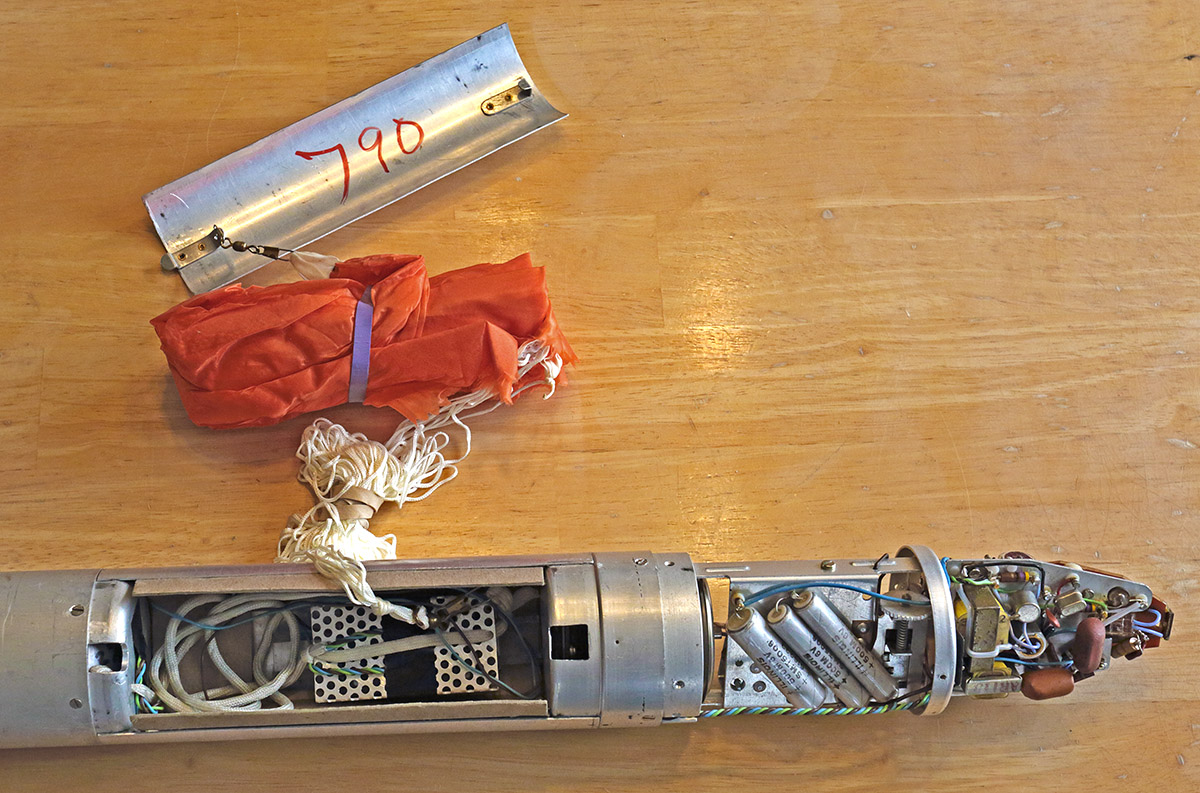
Nose section of the Cricketsonde rocket with nose and payload covers removed. Telemetry and sensor electronics along with recovery parachute shown.

The rocket was able to be recovered as the recovery section contained a 5-foot parachute, to which the entire rocket was attached. After launch, a preset timer controlled deployment of the parachute.

== Ground equipment ==
The ground receiving station consisted of a manually tracked antenna, receiver, recorder and a power generator. More specifically, the receiver setup was composed of a microwave receiver (Polard Model R), frequency meter and discriminator (General Radio Corp Type 1142-A), a loudspeaker, and a multivibrator-pulse shaper.

== Operation ==
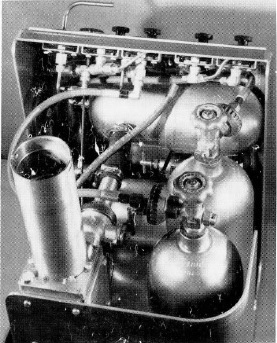
Cricketsonde Launcher 01

In preparing the rocket for launch, the propellant chamber was first partially filled with acetone, then liquid CO_{2} was pumped in to a pressure of 400psi, being dissolved by the acetone in the process. After propellant charging was completed, the rocket was loaded tail-first into the launch breech, and a valved plug inserted into the nozzle. The launch chamber below the breech was charged with gaseous CO_{2} under pressure, and a launch tube added to the breech.

At launch, a valve released the gaseous CO_{2} to expel the rocket. As the rocket left the launch tube, the plug in the rocket nozzle dropped off, allowing the rocket's fins to be deployed and the propellent charge to be released through the nozzle. The propellent discharge lasted about two seconds, giving the rocket a velocity of about 550fps (167 meters per second) and about 75g's acceleration for a .75 lb payload.

After the propellant was exhausted, the rocket coasted to apogee, obtained approx 13–14 seconds after launch (with a .75 lb payload). A timer device then opened the parachute compartment, deploying the 5-foot parachute, and the rocket descended at about 10 fps (3 meters per second).

== Development and operational use history ==
October - December 1963: Cricketsonde flights were conducted at the Otis Air Force Base, Massachusetts, to determine the operational feasibility of the system. The results indicated "that the Cricketsonde had a good potential as an operational system."

1964 or 1965 - At the request of a Texaco representative, the Cricketsonde was given operational tests with inconclusive results by WO Gary Meyers, USMC and members of the Marine Corps aerological staff at Marine Corps Air Station Cherry Point, North Carolina. Later, the Cricketsonde was tested on a field exercise at Page Field, Parris Island, South Carolina. Recollections of LtCol Gary Meyers, USMC Ret.

August 1966, August 1968: The Cricketsonde system was used in conjunction with lidar to make vertical temperature and humidity structure observations. These observations were used to examine any relationship between vertical distribution of atmospheric aerosols and the vertical profiles of temperature and humidity, the purpose being to explore the utility of optical radar to detect and measure meteorological features of the lower atmosphere, such as temperature inversions, haze and smog layers, and humidity variations.
