= Charles Frederick Page =

American airship inventor

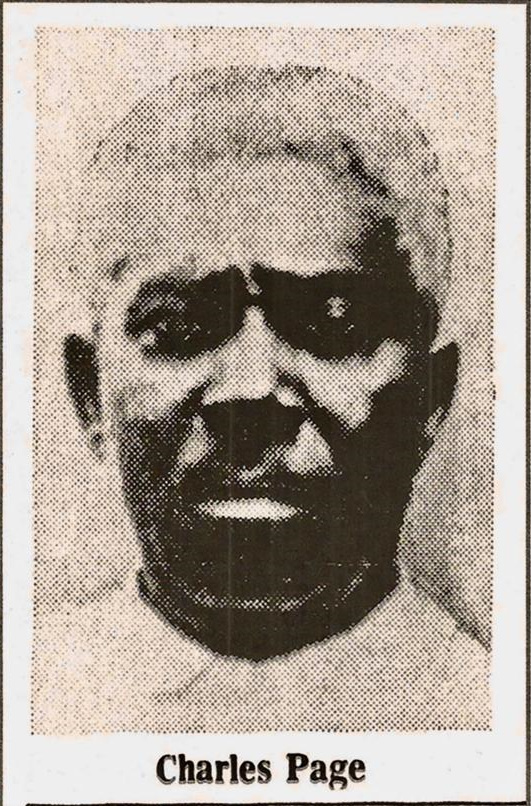
- Born: c. 1864; Louisiana, US
- Died: November 18, 1937 (aged 72–73); Alexandria, Louisiana, US
- Occupations: Timber contractor and inventor

Charles Frederick Page (c. 1864 - November 18, 1937) was a timber contractor who designed and built a full-scale airship.

== Biography ==
Page was born into slavery in c. 1864, in Rapides Parish or Caddo Parish Louisiana. and he taught himself to read and write.

== Airship ==
Page was described as a deep thinker who both thought about many subjects but also attempted to execute many of his ideas. His daughter stated that he was inspired by a "mosquito hawk" in the 1890s to build his own airship. He designed his airship and filed a patent for it, which was registered as United States patent US817442A dated April 24, 1903.

Charles Page's patent was for a type of airship. Airships - flying vehicles suspended by balloons - had already been invented long before, but Page’s design was innovative in its use of two balloons, instead of one, and its rudder and gas motor to address propulsion, control, and stability, not just lift. Multiple balloons had been proposed - and even used - before, George Caley's 1817 design had one spherical and one long balloon (either joined or separate) but was never built, Ernest Pétin's aerial ship had proposed using four spherical balloons in a line in 1850, but never flew. Solomon Andrews' Aereon (the first dirigible airship) in 1863 used three cigar-shaped balloons, and flew in New Jersey, and the LZ 1 used seventeen separate gas balloons within an aluminium framework and a fabric envelope.

Page constructed a full-scale model of his design which he shipped to the Louisiana Purchase Exposition of 1904 for display and as a competition entry, but the airship was stolen in transit and never recovered. This discouraged him and he did not continue to work on his idea. He was granted his patent his airship April 10, 1906

== Career and volunteer work ==
Page worked as a contractor for the timber industry sourcing timber for specific requirements of other industries, including railroad ties, telegraph poles and bridge beams. He also set up a small cabinet making business.

He helped to clear the ground of tree stumps for the Greenwood Memorial Park in Pineville, Louisiana, then assisted the superintendent with landscaping. Inspired by this, he then worked to setup the Lincoln Memorial Cemetery, also in Pineville, where he is buried.

== Death and legacy ==
Page died November 18, 1937, at his home in Alexandria, Louisiana. He married Ida A. Kelso in 1858 and they had eleven children.

The Smithsonian had an exhibit on Page in the 1990s.

A historical marker in his honor was unveiled in Pineville in 2024, the city where Page lived and made his invention. Two models were produced for display in the Louis Armstrong New Orleans International Airport and in the Ernest N. Morial Convention Center.

In 2024 the Louisiana State Museum hosted a display for Page's "tumultuous and trailblazing aviation journey" at its Wedell-Williams Aviation & Cypress Sawmill Museum branch.
