= Wilfrid de Fonvielle =

French science writer and balloonist (1824–1914)

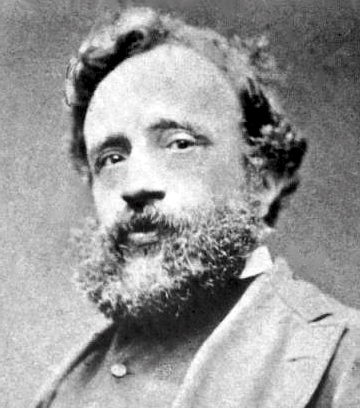
Wilfrid de Fonvielle

Wilfrid de Fonvielle (1824 – 1914) was a French science writer and balloonist.

He published hundreds of articles for technical and scientific journals such as L'Aérophile, La Nature, la Revue Scientifique, La Science illustrée, and L'électricité. He was editor of L'Aérophile.

In 1858, he spent two days in a balloon, and in 1869, he traveled 90 km with Gaston Tissandier in 35 minutes. During the siege of Paris in the Franco-Prussian War, he escaped from the city in a balloon and went to London.

His brothers, Arthur (1830–1914) and Ulrich (1833–1911), were political journalists.
