= Ellehammer helicopter =

Experimental Danish aircraft, 1912

"Helicopter"
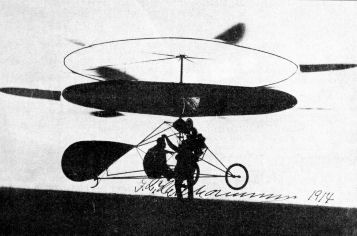
- 1914 photo of Ellehammer's coaxial helicopter hovering

General information
- Type: Experimental helicopter
- Manufacturer: Jacob Ellehammer
- Designer: Jacob Ellehammer
- Number built: 1

History
- First flight: 28 September 1912

The Ellehammer helicopter was an otherwise-unnamed experimental aircraft built in Denmark in 1912. Based on experiments with models, Jacob Ellehammer constructed a full-size machine equipped with two contra-rotating discs, each of which was fitted with six vanes around its circumference. The pitch of these vanes could be varied in operation by the pilot, an early example of cyclic control. The same engine that drove the rotors also powered a propeller mounted tractor-wise to the aircraft's frame.

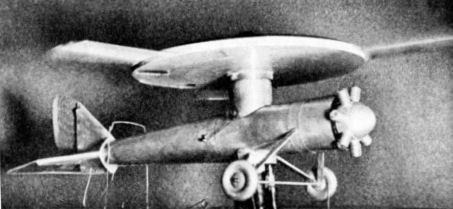
1935 photo of Ellehammer's disc-rotor compound helicopter model

After a number of indoor tests, the aircraft was demonstrated outdoors and made a number of free take-offs. One of these trials was witnessed by Prince Axel of Denmark. Experiments with the helicopter continued until September 1916, when it tipped over during take-off, destroying its rotors.

A famous photo shows it hovering in 1914, though there is no evidence that it was successful in achieving translational flight. Ellehammer later studied a disc-rotor configuration - a compound helicopter with coaxial blades that extended from the hub for hover, and retracted for high speed vertical flight. Although a wind tunnel model was constructed, there's no evidence that anything more was studied.

== Specifications ==
General characteristics

- Crew: One pilot
- Powerplant: 1 × Custom-built radial engine , 27 kW (36 hp)
- Main rotor diameter: 2 × 7.47 m (24 ft 7 in)
- Main rotor area: 12.0 m^{2} (130 sq ft)
