= Totex =

Japanese manufacturer

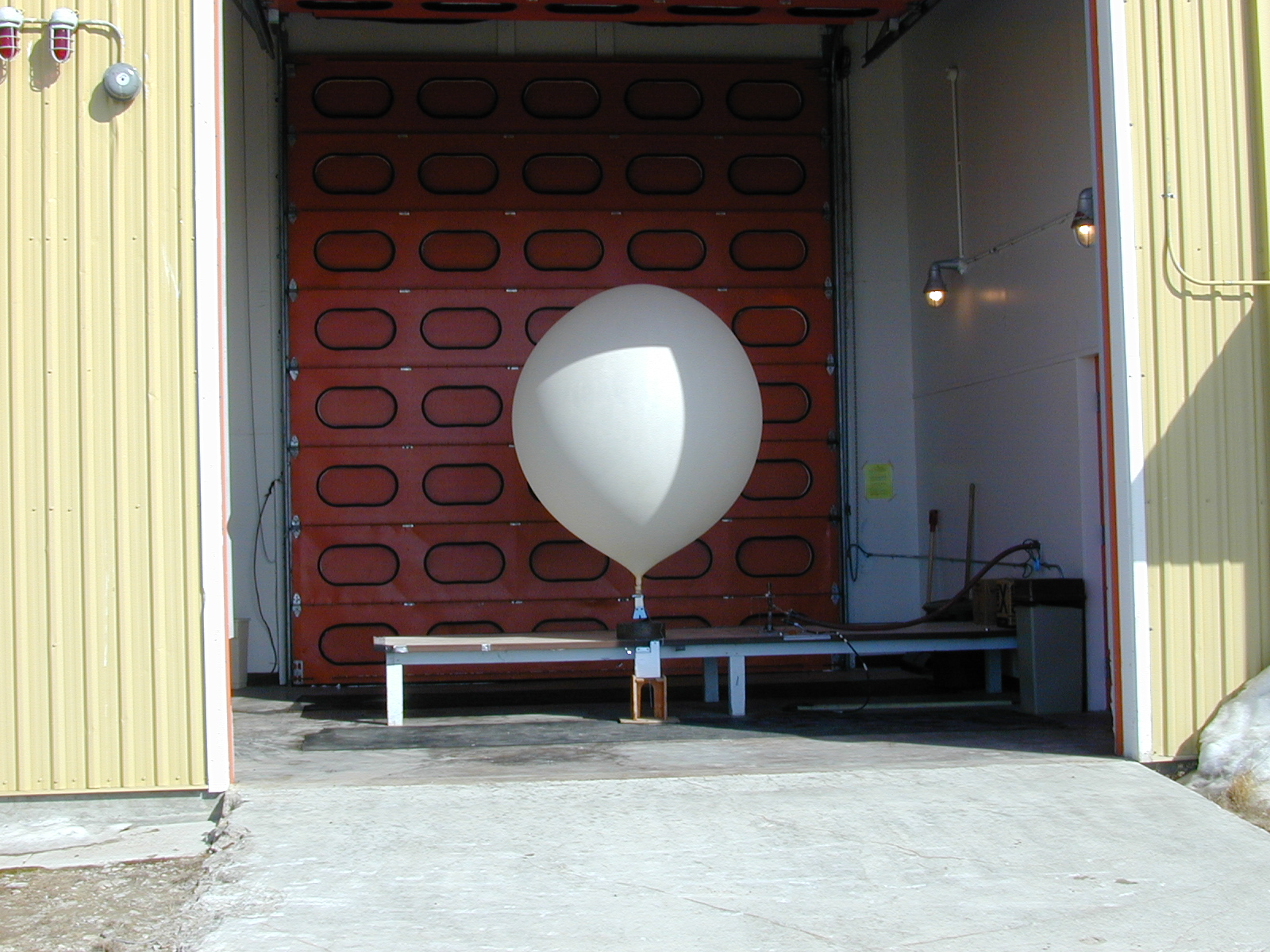
A TX balloon at Cambridge Bay Upper Air station, Nunavut, Canada

Totex Corporation is a Japanese manufacturer of meteorological balloons. The company began production of balloons in 1937.

They currently produce three types of balloons:

- TA is a rubber/latex balloon and was developed in 1940.
- CR is a chloroprene balloon and was developed in 1966.
- TX is a latex balloon and was developed in 1988.

The TX balloon is the standard used by Environment Canada in their Upper Air program (see Radiosonde).
