= L'Aérophile =

French aviation magazine (1893–1947)

L’Aérophile
- L'Aérophile cover from 1898
- Editors: Georges Besançon, Wilfrid de Fonvielle, Emmanuel Aimé
- Frequency: Monthly; weekly
- Publisher: Aéro-Club de France, Blondel la Rougery
- First issue: 1893
- Final issue: 1947
- Country: France
- Based in: Paris
- Language: French

L’Aérophile (French pronunciation: [laeʁɔfil], "The Aerophile") was a French aviation magazine published from 1893 to 1947. It has been described as "the leading aeronautical journal of the world" around 1910.

== History and contents ==
L’Aérophile was founded and run for many years by Georges Besançon. In 1898 it became the official journal of the Aéro Club of France.

Important developments in early aviation were documented in its pages:

- Octave Chanute's April 1903 speech to the Aéro-Club describing the excitement of the gliding experiments done by his group in 1896/7 and of the Wright brothers was printed in April, 1903. Also Ferdinand Ferber's 1902 glider, the first in Europe modeled on those of the Wright brothers, was illustrated in the February 1903 issue.
- The journal published illustrations of ailerons on Robert Esnault-Pelterie’s glider in June 1905, and the ailerons were widely copied afterward.
- In December 1905 and January 1906 journal articles confirmed that the Wright brothers had (as they claimed) flown a controlled, powered airplane, at a time when many readers did not believe this.
- The journal covered at length Alberto Santos-Dumont’s flights of 1906, which were the first airplane flights in Europe.
- Editor Georges Besançon wrote that Wilbur Wright's 1908 flights in France had erased doubts about the Wright brothers' previous experiments.
- L'Aérophile published René Lorin’s article of 1 September 1908 in which he first proposed the ramjet.

Historian Charles Gibbs-Smith criticised L’Aérophile for not publishing the official report on the tests of Clément Ader’s 1897 Avion III when this report was finally made public in 1910, and thus failing to oppose the claim that Ader's machine had made a controlled flight in 1897. L'Aérophile was a monthly publication in its first years, then started to come out twice a month in 1910.

== Affiliations ==
From 1893–94, L'Aérophile was associated with the Union aérophile de France. Starting at the end of 1898 it was the official journal of the Aero Club of France. In later years it was also an official publication of the alumni association (Association des anciens élèves) of the French national aeronautical college (École nationale supérieure de l'aéronautique).

== Bibliography and archives ==
Some early issues have been scanned and are available at Internet Archive thanks to the Smithsonian Institution Libraries. Other issues are online at Google Books. Some portion of the L'Aérophile archives are kept by the US Library of Congress.
