= Ernest Pétin =

French milliner and balloonist

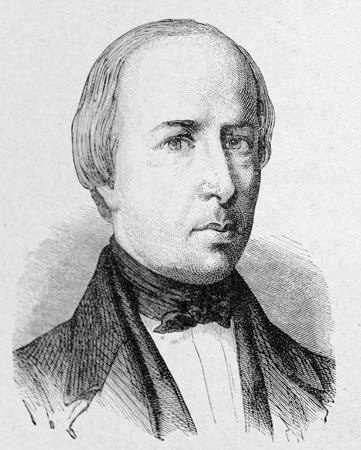
Portrait

Ernest Petin (24 March 1812, Paris – 1878) was a French milliner and balloonist. He researched balloons and tried to construct them based on the structure of bird wings. After several failures he came up with designs that he claimed could carry three thousand people. In August 1852 he and three others ascended using large balloons named the Bon Vivant, 102 feet long with sails and a long gondola. Financial troubles and a refusal by French officials (one officer, Léon Faucher, told him that his balloons were unsupportable as the railroads were troublesome enough) to support his plan for an aerial transport system consisting of trains made of balloons forced him to leave France and move to the United States of America in 1852. He gave a series of lectures on "Etherian Navigation" and attempted some more flights to promote transatlantic flight. A flight on July 5, 1852, failed at Bridgeport after running into telegraph wires. An attempt on Christmas 1852 at New Orleans ended with the craft crashing into Lake Borgne. He claimed to have risen 18,000 feet.

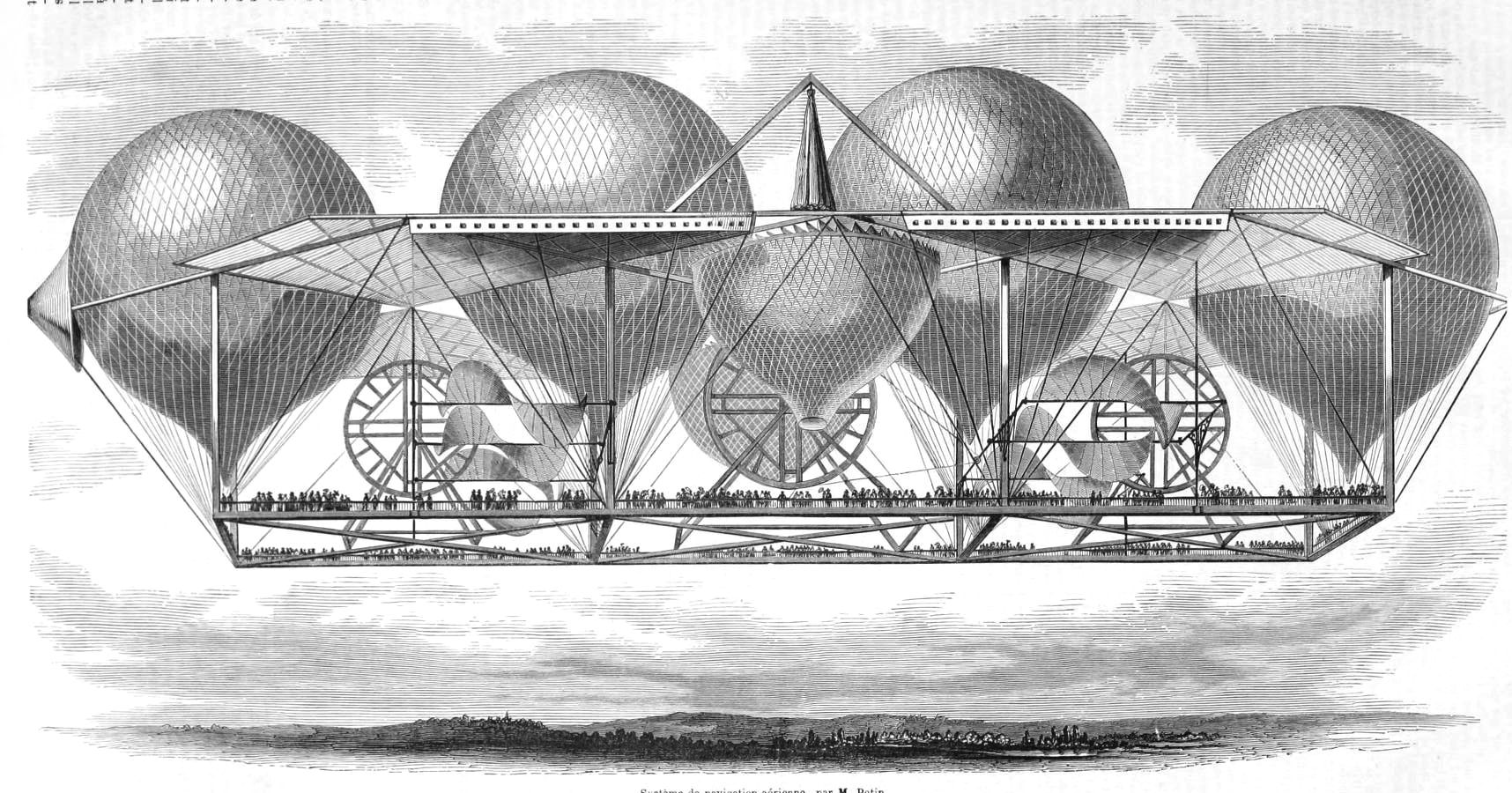
Petin's plan for an aerial platform or "aerostat"

Petin returned to France around 1853 and died at his home in Paris in 1878. Petin finds mention in Jules Verne's Un drame dans les airs.
