= Metasonix =

American audio equipment manufacturer

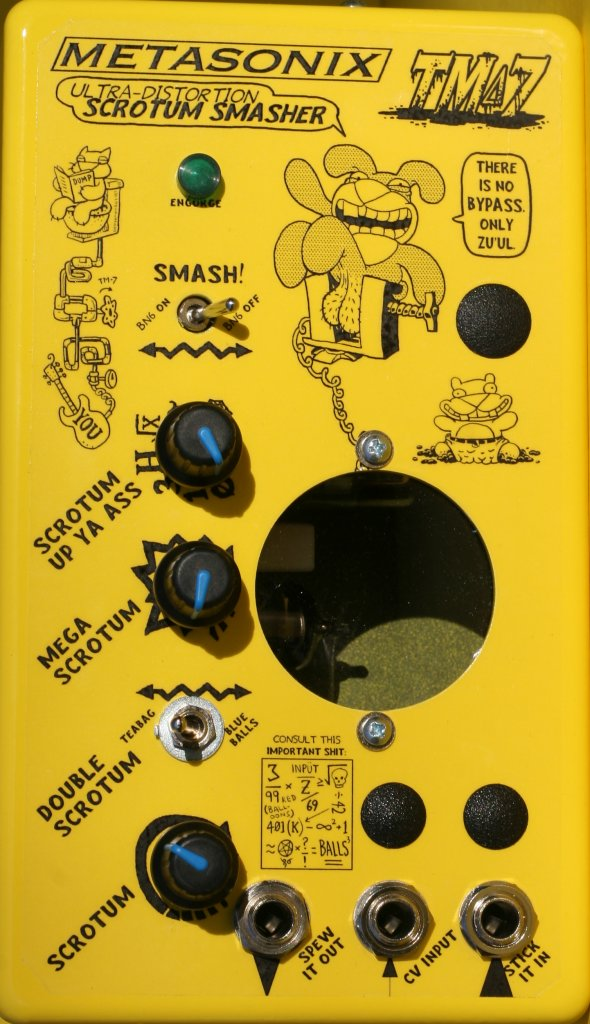
Metasonix TM7 Ultra-Distortion Scrotum Smasher

Metasonix is an audio equipment manufacturer based in Lakeport, California. Founded by Eric Barbour in 1998, it specializes in vacuum tube equipment.

Eli Crews, writing in Electronic Musician in 2008, commented that "Eric Barbour of Metasonix has a colorful approach to design, employing an all-tube audio path in his quest for unusual and sonically extreme products."

== Background ==
Barbour worked as an applications engineer for the Russian vacuum tube manufacturer Svetlana Electron Devices. He was a staff editor and co-founder of Vacuum Tube Valley magazine and contributed to Glass Audio magazine.

== Products ==
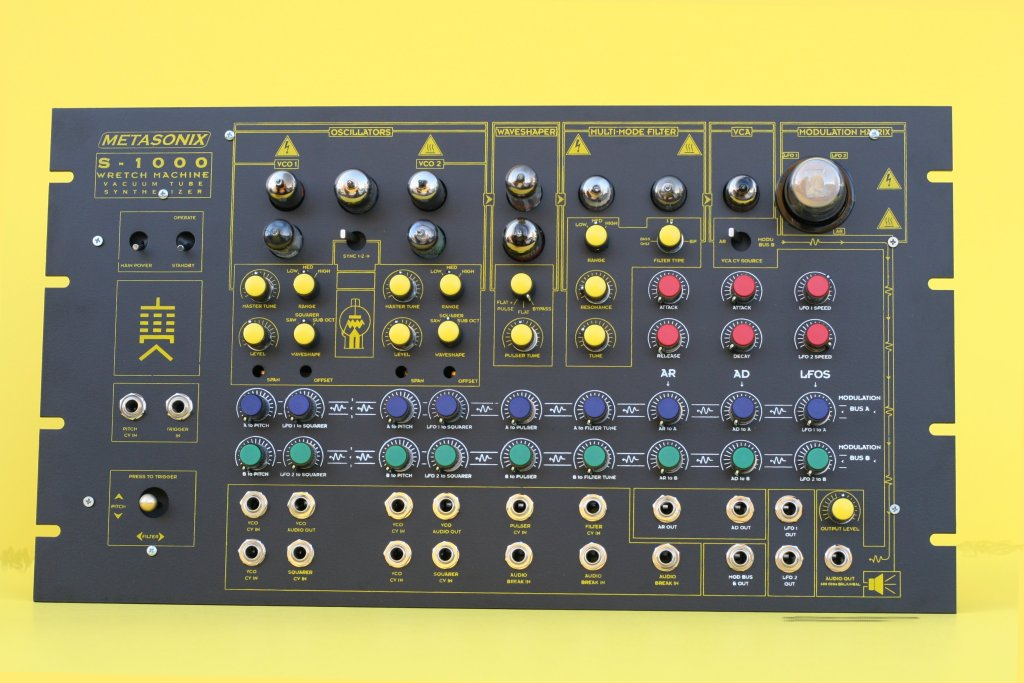
Metasonix S-1000 "Wretch Machine" synthesizer

Metasonix produces audio effects and synthesizers using atypical vintage vacuum tubes. Metasonix modules are considered high-end in pricing and consume large amounts of power to create highly distorted sounds. Its products include the TM-7 "Scrotum Smasher", the TM-3 voltage-controlled oscillator, the TM-6 filter, the TX-1 "Agonizer", the TX-2 "Butt Probe", the TS-21 waveshaper, the S-1000 Wretch Machine, and the G-1000 Fucking Fucker guitar amplifier. Metasonix also sells a drum machine based on vacuum tubes, the D-2000.

The Metasonix TM-7 Ultra-Distortion Scrotum Smasher features control options based on distortion and power with intentionally vulgar names: Smash, Scrotum, Double Scrotum, Mega Scrotum, and Scrotum Up Ya Ass. Audio Geek said of it, "The TM-7 is basically a mean, angry guitar preamp made of three vacuum tubes. Plus a feedback loop which makes the preamp unstable. There is nothing else like it."
