= Ellehammer semi-biplane =

"Semi-biplane"
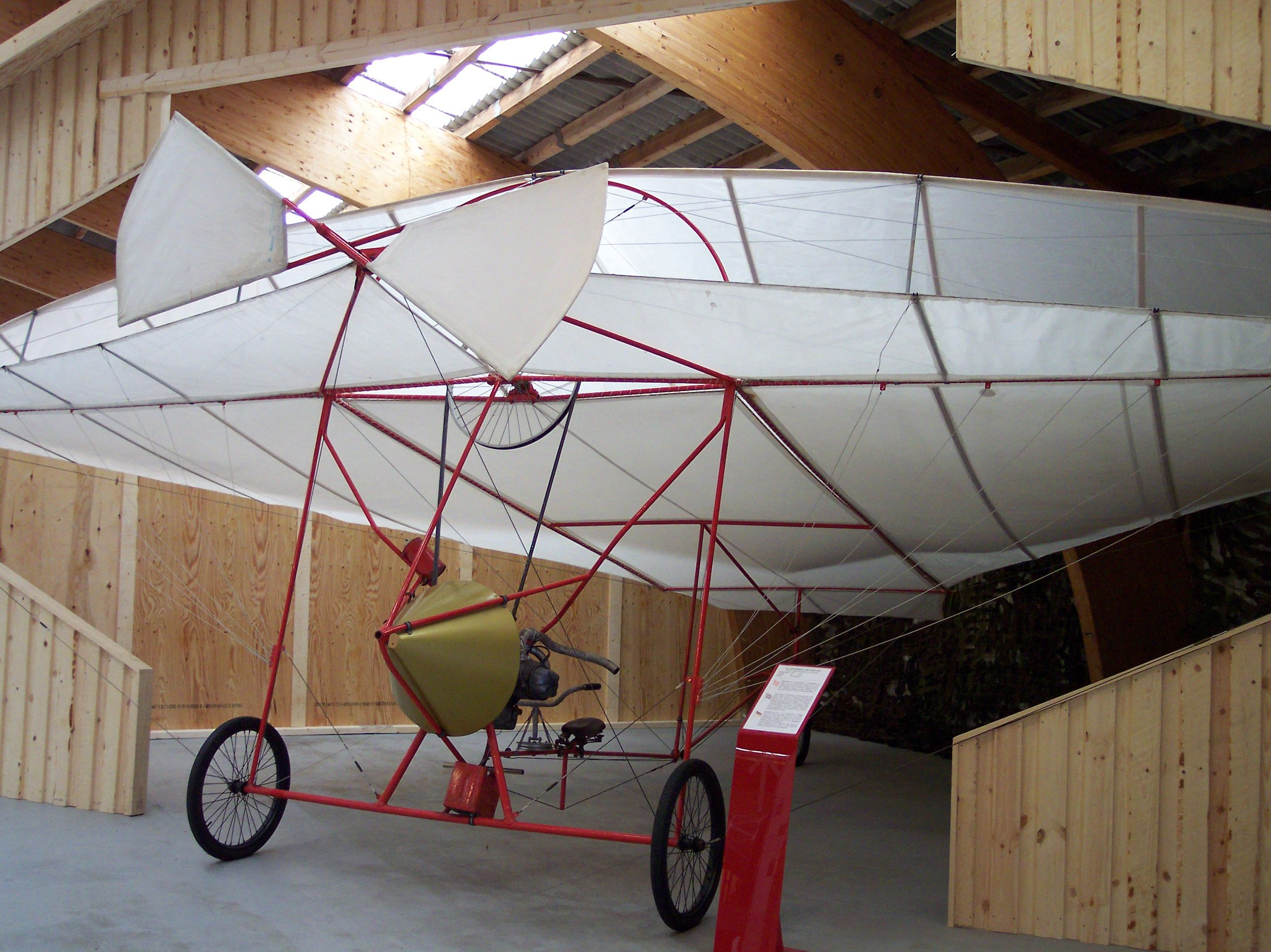
- Replica of the semi-biplane in the Danmarks Flymuseum

General information
- Type: Experimental aircraft
- Manufacturer: Jacob Ellehammer
- Designer: Jacob Ellehammer
- Number built: 1

History
- First flight: 12 September 1906

The Ellehammer Semi-biplane was a pioneering aircraft flown in Denmark in 1906. Jacob Ellehammer built the aircraft based on his monoplane design of the previous year. Like that aircraft, it featured a large, triangular wing, with a motor (of Ellehammer's own design and construction) mounted beneath it. The pilot sat on a seat that was suspended like a pendulum, allowing him to shift his weight to control the aircraft, similar in concept (if not execution) to the control of a modern hang-glider. Unlike his monoplane, however, the semi-biplane's main wing formed a constant, unbroken span. Additionally, it was fitted with an upper wing of the same triangular shape, which connected to the main wing at its three corners and to an arch above the aircraft's centreline.

In this aircraft, Ellehammer made a short hop on Lindholm Island on 16 August, and a sustained flight on 12 September, covering 42 metres at an altitude of around 50 cm (140 ft at around 2 ft). This was not a free flight, however, as the aircraft was tethered to a pole at the center of the runway. A replica of the aircraft was constructed in 1966 by Arvid Ligaard Sørensen, powered by a Citroën 2CV engine and donated to the Danmarks Flymuseum. Tests with the replica showed difficulties in transmitting engine power to the propeller and while this aircraft could taxi, it proved impossible to coax from the ground.

== Specifications (variant) ==
General characteristics

- Crew: One pilot
- Length: 9.40 m (30 ft 10 in)
- Wingspan: 6.00 m (19 ft 8 in)
- Powerplant: 1 × custom-built 3-cylinder radial , 14 kW (18 hp)
