= Gustave Hermite =

French aeronaut and physicist

- Born: 11 June 1863; Nancy
- Died: 9 November 1914 (aged 51); Bois-Colombes
- Occupation: Physicist; inventor

Gustave Hermite (11 June 1863 – 9 November 1914) was a French aeronaut and physicist, pioneer with Georges Besançon of the weather balloon. He was the nephew of Charles Hermite, one of the fathers of modern mathematical analysis.

== Biography ==
Gustave Hermite was born in Nancy, France, on 11 June 1863. Fond of sciences, he began studying chemistry in 1884 at the laboratory of the Academy of Neuchâtel in Switzerland, then turned to astronomy. His first communication to the French Academy of Sciences in 1884 deals with an astronomical telescope of its design. In 1885, he became a member of the Astronomical Society of France. He then embarked on developing inventions and in 1887, he designed and made a rangefinder, then in 1888 a small captive helicopter powered by an electric motor attached to a battery on the ground.

In 1889 he began experimenting with heavier than air aviation: small airplanes propelled by rockets or kites used as a means of traction, on water or on ice. On 17 August 1889, he made his first flight in an untethered balloon and, with his friend Georges Besançon, in 1889 built the Sirius in which they made a trip from Paris to Le Creusot in 16 hours with a stop in the Yonne Department.

In 1890–91, Hermite and Besançon planned a flight over the North Pole but the project did not materialize for lack of funding. The two men began then working on high altitude balloons for scientific purposes. In early 1892, they launched a series of small paper balloons filled with gas to become familiar with the technique. On 17 September, the first documented weather balloon in history flew, with a barometer and a minimum thermometer. The ball fell to the ground thanks to a parachute and the instruments could be recovered.

Having demonstrated the feasibility of the balloon probe, which he gave the name of weather balloon, and thanks to the support of the Union Aerophile de France, they then launch a series of balloons capable of carrying more than 10,000 meters a nacelle weighing several kilograms containing recording devices which inaugurated a series of international scientific ascents. In 1898 Léon Teisserenc de Bort organized the beginnings of systematic sounding of the atmosphere at the Trappes Observatory of Dynamic Meteorology .

Gustave Hermite died on 9 November 1914 in Bois-Colombes, a suburb of Paris.
