= Georges Besançon =

French editor and balloonist (1866–1934)

Georges Besançon, 1894

Georges Besançon (1866–1934) founded and edited the aeronautical journal L'Aérophile.

Besançon was a balloonist ("aeronaut") and journalist. Besançon helped train the later-celebrated balloonist Salomon Andrée, probably in the late 1880s.

In 1892, Besançon and scientist Gustave Hermite sent instruments on fabric or paper balloons into the upper atmosphere for meteorological research. In 1901, Hermite and Besançon sent up small instrumented rubber balloons that were designed to expand until at a high altitude they would burst. Then their instruments would descend by parachute.

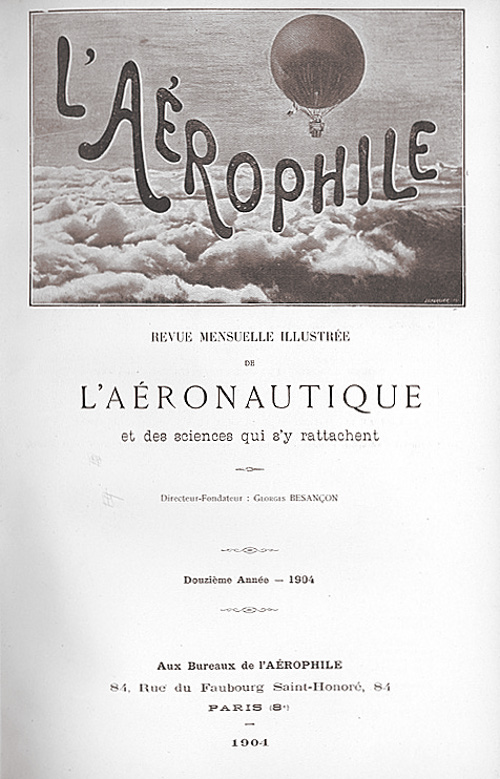
L'Aerophile

Besançon founded the aeronautical periodical L'Aérophile in 1893, and remained its director until at least 1910. There he covered and reported on the era in which the airplane was invented and an international airplane industry arose.
