= Jacob Ellehammer =

Danish watchmaker and inventor

Jacob Christian Hansen-Ellehammer
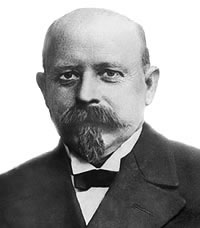
- Born: Jacob Christian Hansen; 14 June 1871; Bakkebølle, Denmark
- Died: 20 May 1946 (aged 74); Gentofte, Zealand, Denmark
- Education: Watchmaker, mechanic
- Engineering career
- Discipline: Aviation
- Significant design: Ellehammer semi-biplane

Jacob Christian Hansen-Ellehammer (14 June 1871 – 20 May 1946) was a Danish inventor and aviation pioneer. He obtained a total of 59 Danish patents and worked with many different things, including amusement machines, Tivoli boats, egg openers, cleavers for pig slaughterhouses, engines in countless shades, motorcycles, cars, alternative energy and fire-fighting equipment. He was also among the first in Europe to fly an airplane.

== Early life ==
Ellehammer was the son of Mads Jakob Hansen (born 1836 in Hjelm on Møn) and his wife Maren Kathrine Larsen (born 1839 in Petersværft on Sydhavsøerne). He took the name Ellehammer in 1901 after his mother's family. Ellehammer's family moved to Vålse on Falster in 1875. The father and his two brothers, Christian and Henrik, took part in the drainage of Vålse Vig using an invented water lift which was driven by a Dutch windmill.

Ellehammer was trained as a watchmaker in Nykøbing Falster and then went to Copenhagen, where he was apprenticed as an electromechanic, which was one of the pioneering jobs of the time.

== Career ==
=== Electronics ===
Completing his apprenticeship, Ellehammer established his own company in 1898. In the beginning he produced cigarette machines, beverage machines and other electronic machinery.

=== Elleham (motorcycle) ===
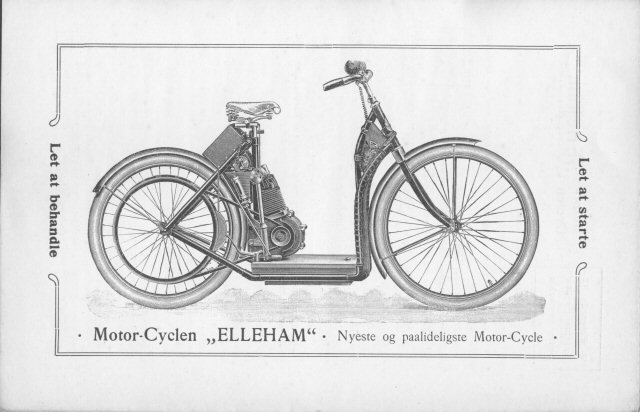
Ellenham

In 1903 Ellehammer made his prototype motorcycle. He designed and made the three-cylinder radial engine that powered it. After further development it was put into production in 1904 as the Elleham. The initial versions were powered by a Zédel enigine. Later models also used a 330cc single-cylinder Peugeot Frères engine. In all over 1,000 Elleham motorcycles were sold including sidecar model for the Post Danmark.

=== Radial Engine ===
In 1903–1904 Ellehammer used his experience with single-cylinder Peugeot Frères engines to build the world's first air-cooled radial engine, a three-cylinder engine by utilizing Peugeot Frères cylinders and heads in a home-cast engine block. The initial engine soon proved too weak and homemade cylinders with a larger volume were fitted on an even bigger block. This same engine was believed to have been used in his later helicopter experiments.

He further developed the radial engine, making a five-cylinder model in 1907. This engine was installed in his triplane.

=== First flights ===
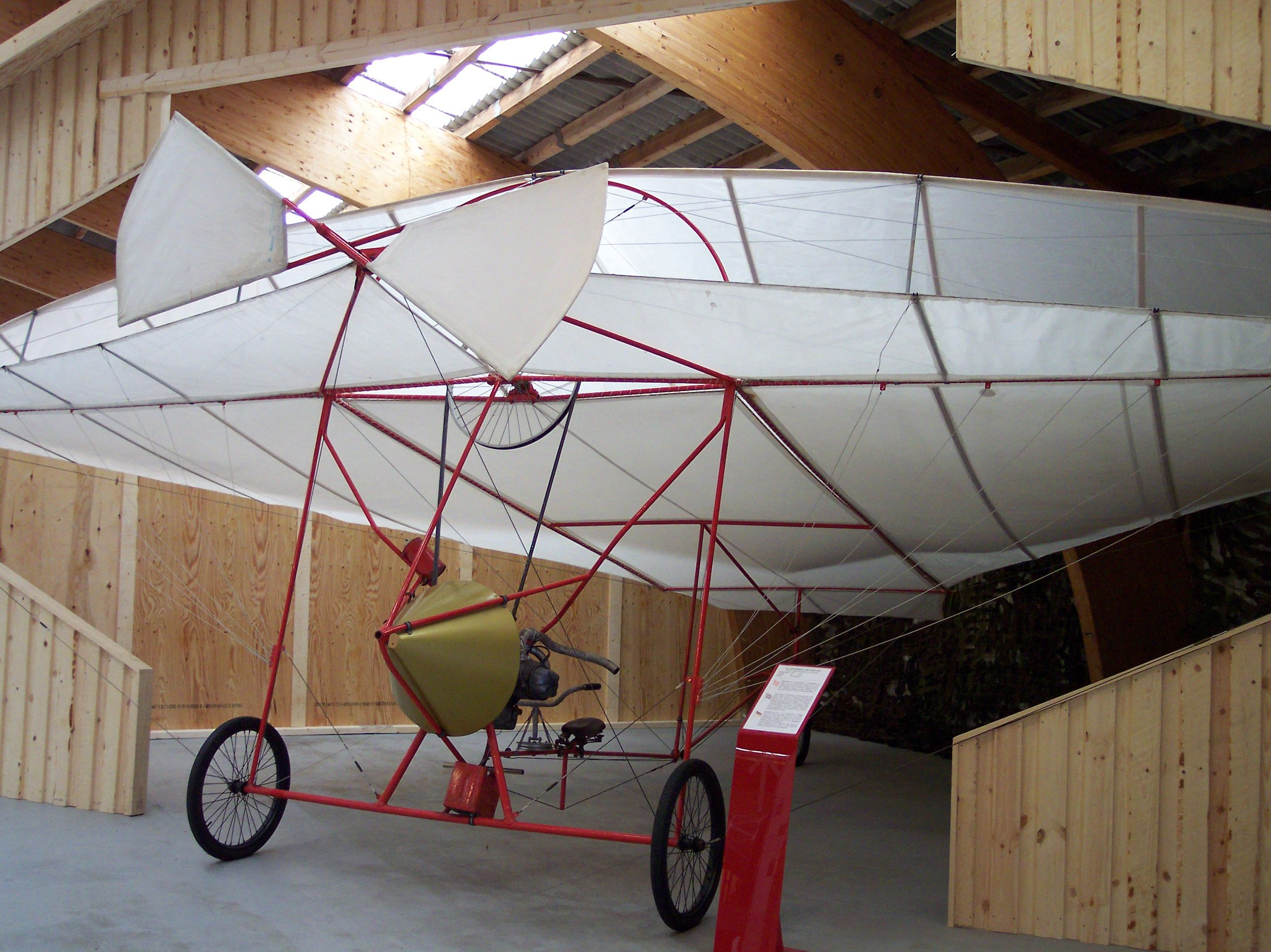
Replica of Ellehammer's 1906 aircraft in the Danmarks Flymuseum

Ellehammer wanted to be the first in Europe to fly and in 1905 built a machine which he called an "airship". It was built as a semi-biplane, which is to say a monoplane with a loose mainsail, very similar to a dual winged hang-glider. He began a series of experiments in January 1906 on the island of Lindholm in Småland. During the flight tests, the machine was tethered to a mast in the middle of the island's round runway. The first engine was judged too weak, so Ellehammer built a new engine with 18 hp, which was used for the flight tests from August 1906. From both his diary and log book, it appears that Ellehammer got the machine to lift of as early as 28 August 1906. At least two photographs from 12 September that year show him hovering above the ground. Because the plane was tethered and controlled flight was not established these were not counted as "flights" in the sense of the Wright brothers 1903 flight. Alberto Santos-Dumont's flight on 23 October 1906 was recognised as the first flight of a heavier-than-air machine in Europe.

Ellehammer continued to work on the problem of controlled flight by making a more powerful engine and on reducing the aircraft's weight. He made test runs of his new construction on the ice on Farum Lake at the end of 1906. In Kiel, Germany, Ellehammer flew on 28 June 1908 approx 50m and thereby won a prize of 5,000 Mark for the achievement.

=== Helicopter ===
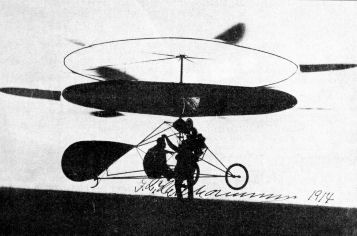
1914 photo of Ellehammer's coaxial helicopter hovering

Hansen-Ellehammer's later inventions included a successful triplane and helicopter. His helicopter was a coaxial machine. A famous photo shows it hovering in 1914, though there is no evidence that it was successful in achieving horizontal flight. Hansen-Ellehammer later studied a disc-rotor configuration - a compound helicopter with coaxial blades that extended from the hub for hover, and retracted for high speed horizontal flight. Although a wind tunnel model was constructed, there's no evidence that anything more was studied.

A down-scaled model of his helicopter was found deep in storage and it had a relatively small three-cylinder radial engine fitted which is considered being reuse of his original engine, hence the first functioning radial engine still exists and is displayed at the Danish Museum of Science & Technology in Helsingør. The engine is started up on a daily basis.

=== Ellemobil (automobile) ===
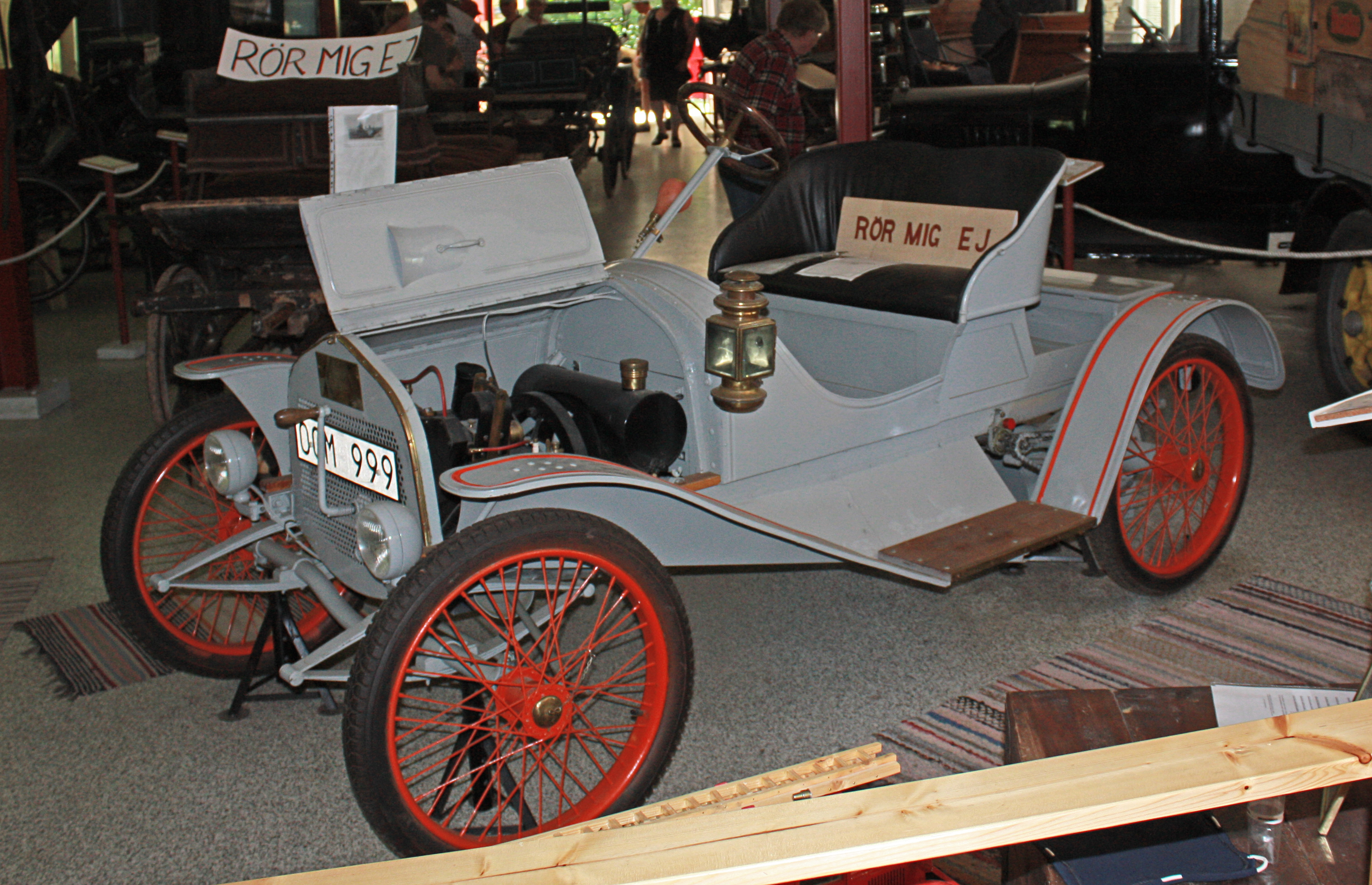
Ellemobil

Ellehammer founded the company that bore his name in Copenhagen in 1909 and began producing automobiles. Between 1909 and 1910, several small cars were built, which were also offered and sold. These were two-seaters. An air-cooled two-cylinder engine was combined with a friction gear and drove the drive axle via belts. In 1913, a model with a three-cylinder engine and 12 hp followed, which remained a prototype. Production ended in 1913.

== Honours ==
In 1986, Hansen-Ellehammer was inducted into the International Air & Space Hall of Fame at the San Diego Air & Space Museum.

The Danish Museum of Science and Technology in Copenhagen permanently exhibits a large number of his inventions. Ellehammer is buried at Hellerup Cemetery. His old company still exists today under the name Ellehammer A/S and is based in Glostrup.

== See also ==
- Early flying machines
