= Fugitive dust =

Atmospheric dust

Fugitive dust is an environmental air quality term for very small particles suspended in the air, primarily mineral dust that is sourced from the soil of Earth's pedosphere. A significant volume of fugitive dust that is visible from a distance is known as a dust cloud, and a large dust cloud driven by a gust front is known as a dust storm.

Fugitive dust particles are mainly minerals common to soil, including silicon oxides, aluminum oxides, calcium carbonates and iron oxides. About half of fugitive dust particles are larger than 10 micrometres in diameter and settle more quickly than the smaller particles. It does not include particulate matter from other common artificial sources such as vehicle exhaust, burn piles or smokestacks. The term is used to denote that the dust "escapes" into the atmosphere rather than being exhausted in a "confined flow stream" from a "ducted emitter" (an exhaust pipe or chimney).

The U.S. Environmental Protection Agency estimated that fugitive dust was responsible for 92% of the PM-10 emissions in the United States in 1995.

== Sources ==
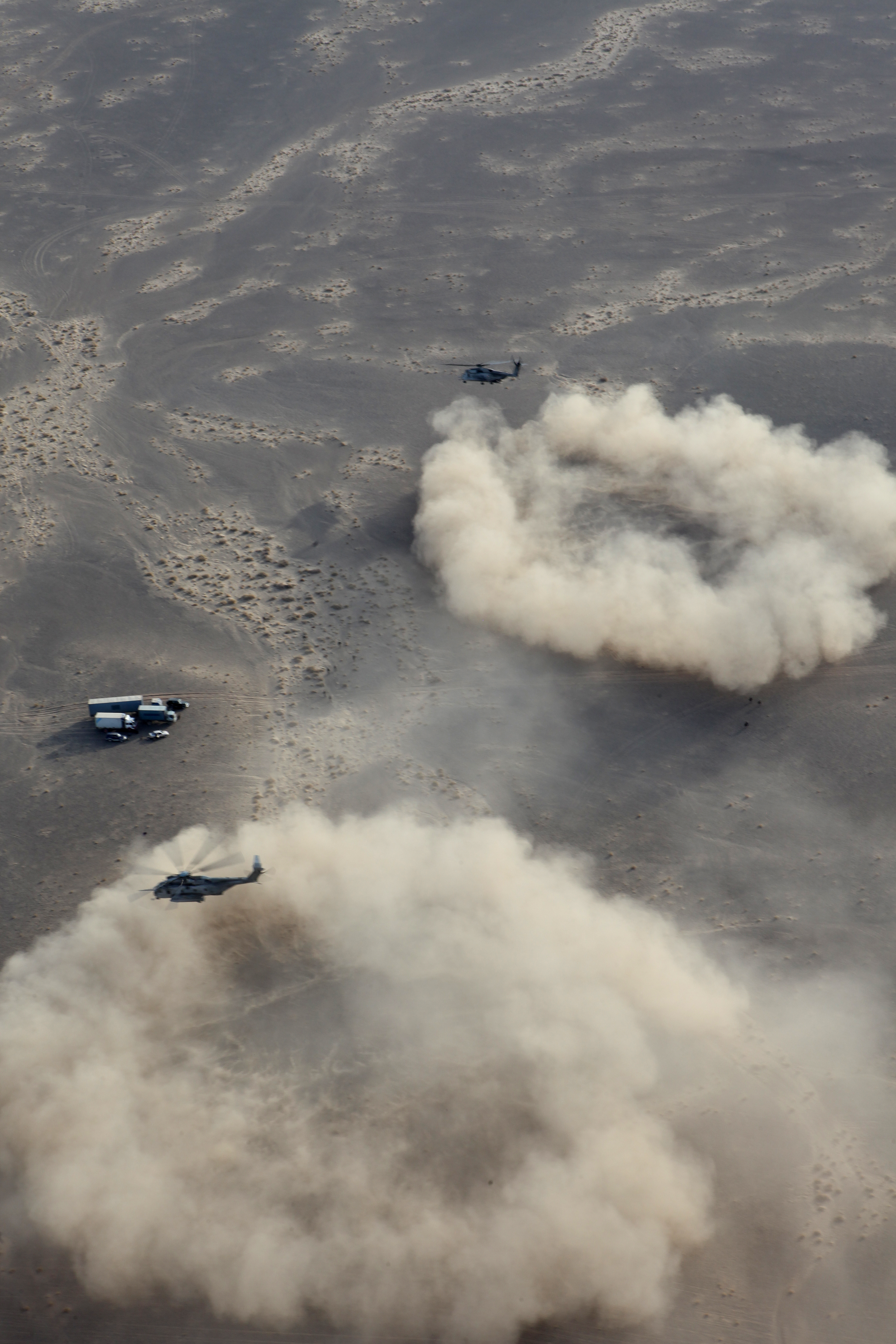
Fugitive dust clouds (brownouts) stirred up by downwash from military helicopters.

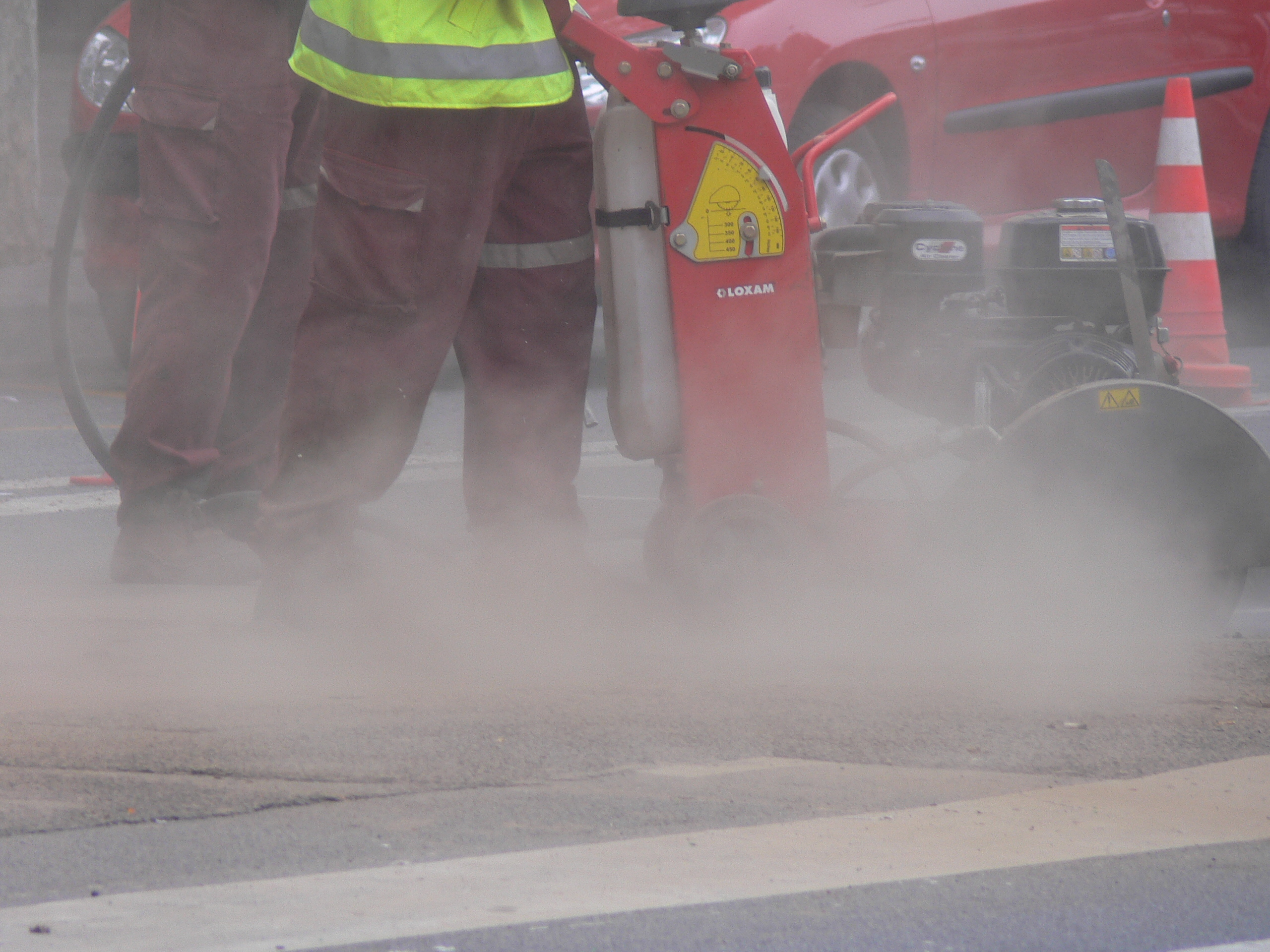
Fugitive dust from construction work in a city.

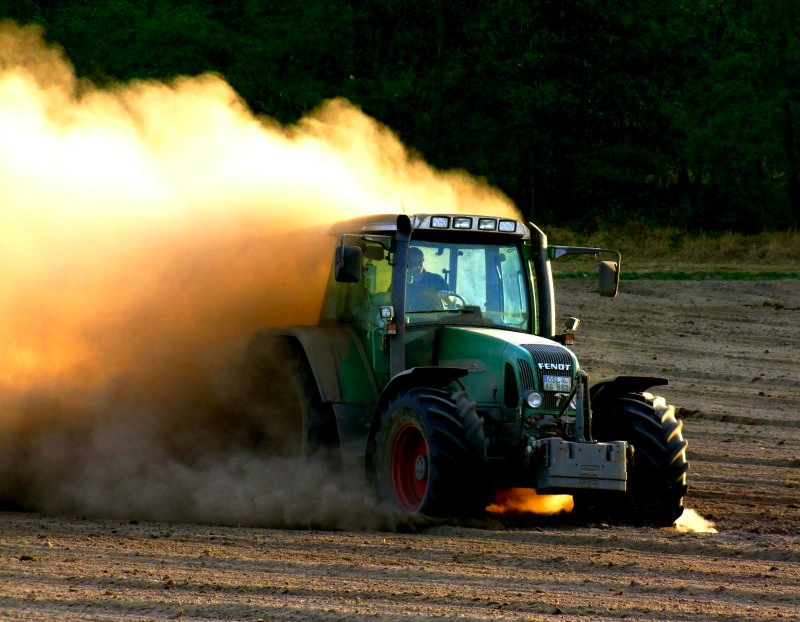
Fugitive dust from agriculture.

Fugitive dust results from dry conditions where there is insufficient moisture content in the ground to maintain adhesion and hold the soil together. Particulate matter (PM) then enters the atmosphere through the action of wind, vehicular movement, or other activities. Areas with dryland or desert climates, especially when combined with high winds, have more severe problems of fugitive dust. Dry and disturbed surfaces can release wind-borne fugitive dust for many months before there is sufficient rainfall to coagulate the soil, this includes the dust Bulldust. Large-scale fugitive dust driven by gust fronts creates a dust storm.

Surfaces susceptible to fugitive dust emissions are both natural and man-made. Specific sources include open fields and parking lots, paved and unpaved roads, agricultural fields, construction sites, unenclosed storage piles, and material transfer systems. Surface mining operations are also sources of fugitive dust as a result of many mining operations including haul roads, tailing piles, drilling, blasting, the removal of overburden and the actual mineral extraction.

In 1995, 28 percent of fugitive dust in the US originated from unpaved roads, 23 percent from construction sites, 19 percent agricultural, 15 percent from paved roads, 5 percent from wind erosion, 1 percent from mining according to the EPA.

In addition to outdoor dust sources, numerous indoor dust sources also exist, often in manufacturing and similar industries. Examples of this include the metalworking process which incorporates different forms of grinding, cutting, and polishing, various food industries like sugar, spices, and grains, and even the pharmaceutical industry during packaging or production. In order to reduce the possibility of different hazards brought upon by indoor fugitive dusts, prevention must be a top priority.

There are two general kinds of hazards associated with airborne dusts- combustible dust scenarios and health effects.

== Combustible dust hazards ==
The presence of indoor dust creates the potential for combustible dust explosions. Several factors are required for this to occur. The "Dust Explosion Pentagon" lists oxygen, heat, fuel, dispersion, and confinement as these key elements. No dust explosion could take place if just one were missing. One important thing to note is that not all fugitive dusts are flammable but should be tested to find if it is a potential hazard. There are also materials that may not be flammable in larger chunks but become a threat when reduced to dust particles.

Dust explosion incidents primarily occur in two separate stages. The initial deflagration usually takes place within machinery or an enclosed area. This can disturb dust which has settled or damage surrounding equipment. The second explosion then has the potential to be far more destructive since more dust is dispersed and ready to ignite.

Examples of combustible dust disasters include:

- Imperial Sugar Factory explosion in Port Wentworth, Georgia. (February 7th, 2008) - Product of smaller explosion taking place inside enclosed conveyor belt. Sugar dust became aloft and triggered a larger secondary explosion. Investigations found that product transfer equipment was not properly designed, and housekeeping procedures were not of a sufficient quality. 14 employees died and 36 were injured.
- Hoeganaes Corporation metal flash fires and hydrogen explosion in Gallatin, Tennessee. (May 27th, 2011) - Hydrogen gas leak accidentally ignited by maintenance workers. Pressure wave from the initial explosion dispersed metal dust from all resting spots within facility. Combustible dust ignited while raining down on employees. Limited enclosure of conveyors and little to no dust clean-up can be credited for how this incident escalated after hydrogen explosion. Incident resulted in 5 deaths and 3 injuries.
- Didion Milling Inc. corn dust explosions in Cambria, Wisconsin. (May 31st, 2017) - Employees began to smell smoke in certain areas of the mill and decided to investigate. While narrowing the source, multiple workers heard and saw an explosion within one of two rotary gap mills. Evacuations quickly took place, but flames and secondary explosions propagated throughout the facility. Multiple buildings collapsed during the incident and equipment was damaged. Investigations found that the explosions were caused by insufficient dust management and a lack of propagation limiting engineering controls. 5 employees died and 14 were seriously injured.

== Health effects ==
The inhalation of PM by people introduces it into the lungs where it can cause respiratory illnesses, permanent lung damage, and in some individuals premature death. PM with diameters of ≤10 micrometers (PM10) can harm human health, with particles of ≤2.5 micrometers (PM2.5) being the worst.

As wind-borne dust can easily migrate, respiratory irritation can occur in construction and agricultural workers close to a source as well as others including wildlife. In addition to adverse health effects, the abrasive nature of particulate matter can cause property damage and obscure visibility leading to vehicular collisions causing injury and death.

Fugitive dust can also harm plant life. In 1999, the National Park Service found that lichen and other non-vascular plants in the Cape Krusenstern National Monument in Alaska were affected due to dust generated from hauling ore from the Red Dog mine along a 19 miles (31 km) road within the monument. A follow-up study in 2006 found slightly elevated levels of lead and cadmium concentrations in small birds and voles captured along the road.

A lawsuit in 2011 filed by 150 Waimea, Hawaii residents alleges that their homes were subjected, "on almost a daily basis", to blown "pesticide-laden fugitive dust". The residents claimed their homes sustained physical damage and they were forced to live with their windows closed year-round. They were seeking monetary damages from DuPont Pioneer to compensate for the reduced value of their homes and suggested future lawsuits would address health issues.

A 2017 lawsuit in Maryland claims that fugitive dust from a 215-foot (66 m)-high pile of coal dust at a coal processing plant has caused "extensive damage" through erosion to blades on wind turbines in a nearby wind farm.

== Measurement ==
One of the first methods of measuring fugitive dust was developed in the 1970s and used isokinetic dust samplers. At least six samplers were needed downstream of a dust source. Exposure profiling was developed later and used in the 1980s and 1990s. Later improvements use time-resolved dust monitors to isolate short-term dust releases. New methods include Optical Remote Sensing which uses an open path laser transmissometer used with time-resolved dust monitors and other wind monitors.

== Prevention ==
Various methods are employed to minimize fugitive dust. In agricultural settings, bare soil can be covered with crop residue or planted with cover crops between seasons. Dirt roads can be sprayed with water to contain dust, or stabilized with chemicals that form hard surface crusts, or paved with aggregate or a hard surface. In windy areas, wind barriers including fences or vegetation can reduce wind speed and trap larger particles already in the air. Irrigation can be used to keep soil moist between natural rainfalls.

Fugitive dust can be controlled by the application of various chemical suppressants including lignin sulfonates, petroleum resins, latexes, salts, plastics, and wetting agents.

Coal dust piles have been treated with water or other chemical surfactants to suppress dust until the moisture evaporates. Other chemicals can provide protection for up to six months. Wind fences of polyester fabric can also be used to slow wind movement and minimize fugitive dust.

For indoor sources, effective prevention methods consist of inspections and material transfer isolation. Implementing a thorough schedule of inspecting locations of potential dust build up and procedures for cleaning these surfaces can limit high accumulations of dust. Enclosing conveyor belts and providing proper dust collection measures will reduce leakage and control dispersion.

== Regulation ==
The US state of Arizona has an Agricultural Dust Program with compliance officers that inspect agricultural operations and investigate dust complaints. All farms in the state must take "reasonable precautions" to "minimize" the emission of fugitive dust. More stringent procedures must be followed in areas that don't meet Federal air quality standards.

The US Federal Environmental Protection Agency has specific standards for daily average particulate matter originating from active mines. Finer particulates have been detected up to 20 kilometres (12 mi) from mining operations.

== Other types ==
Dust emitted from processing equipment that may not contain typical soil components is also considered fugitive dust. In this context, fugitive dust is dust that has "escaped" during any mechanical process and entered the atmosphere. Fugitive dust emissions within a structure can not only cause respiratory problems but, when generated during the processing of combustible materials, can cause fire and blast damage if ignited.

Fugitive dust acquires an electrostatic charge when dispersed in the air. Spraying an oppositely charged water fog can be used to effectively control dust in an industrial setting. If so charged, less water is needed to cause the particulate matter to drop from the air. This method has been tested with many materials including silica flour, sulfur dioxide, and fly ash.

== See also ==
- Air pollution
- Asian dust
- Bull dust
- Coal dust
- Dry quicksand
- Fech fech
- Occupational dust exposure
