= Interceptor ditch =

Small constructed drainage channel

In geotechnical engineering, an interceptor ditch is a small ditch or channel constructed to intercept and drain water to an area where it can be safely discharged. These are used for excavation purposes of limited depth made in a coarse-grained soils. These are constructed around an area to be dewatered. Sump pits are also placed at suitable intervals for installation of centrifugal pumps to remove the water collected in an efficient manner. In fine sands and silts, there may be sloughing, erosion or quick conditions. For such type of soils the method is confined to a depth of 1 to 2 m. Interceptor ditches are most economical for carrying away water which emerge on the slopes and near the bottom of the foundation pit. Its size depends on the original ground slope, runoff area, type of soil and vegetation, and other factors related to runoff volume.

== Construction guidelines ==
- The interceptor ditch commonly consists of a ditch and may have an associated dike.
- Sediment control measures may be required to filter or trap sediments before the runoff leaves the construction area.
- The construction of the interceptor ditch at the crown of a slope is normally accomplished prior to the excavation of the cut section.

== Maintenance ==
Inspection and maintenance is necessary after completion of construction of any structure. Here some steps followed in the maintenance of interceptor ditches are summarized below:

- Periodic inspection and maintenance will be required based on post-construction site conditions.
- Make any repairs necessary to ensure that it is operating properly.
- Locate any damaged areas and repair as necessary.
- Remove any channel obstructions (particularly waste materials) which would otherwise obstruct dewatering.

== See also ==
- Earthworks (engineering)
- Digging
- Culvert – Structure to channel water past an obstacle
