= Brownout (aeronautics) =

In-flight visual impairment by pilots

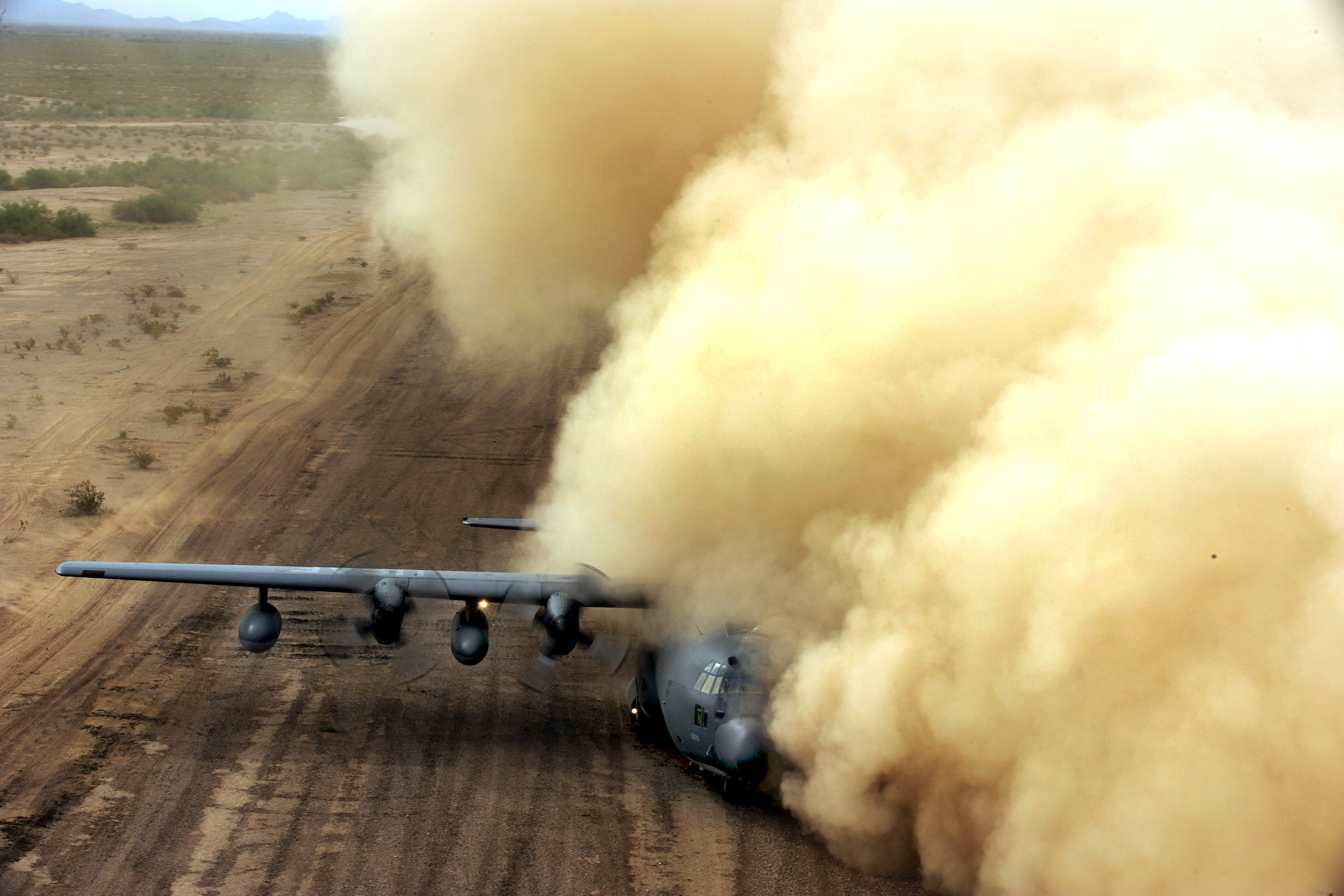
A HC-130 Hercules gets a brownout on a dirt airstrip.

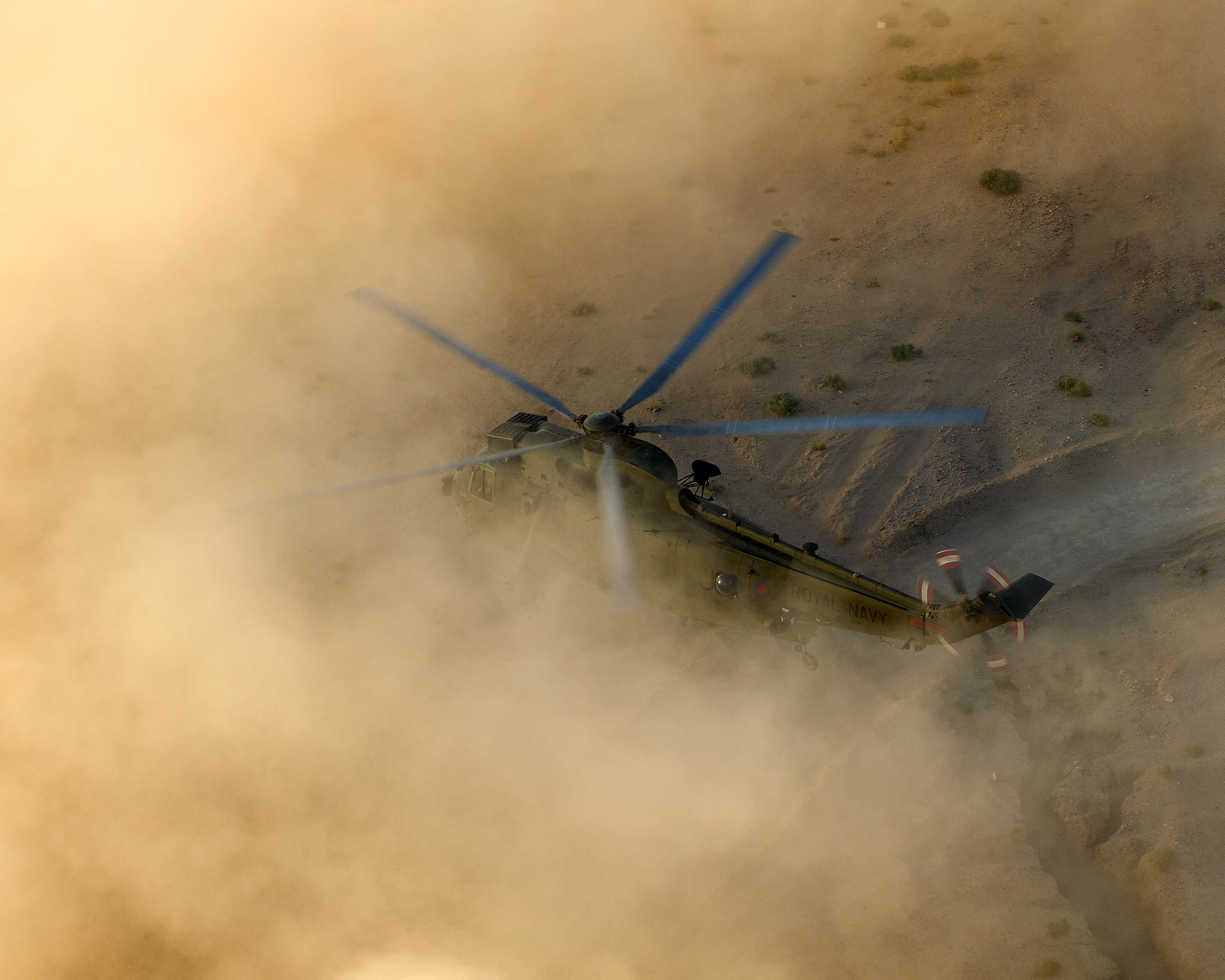
Sea King of 845 NAS on exercise in the Jordanian desert in 2013

Downwash from a CH-47 Chinook kicks up a dust cloud resulting in brownout.

In aviation, a brownout (or brown-out) is an in-flight visibility restriction due to dust or sand in the air. In a brownout, the pilot cannot see nearby objects which provide the outside visual references necessary to control the aircraft near the ground. This can cause spatial disorientation and loss of situational awareness leading to an accident. Pilots have compared landing during brownouts to parallel parking an automobile with one's eyes closed.

== Description ==
The brownout phenomenon causes accidents during helicopter landing and take-off operations in arid desert terrain. Intense, blinding dust clouds stirred up by the helicopter rotor downwash during near-ground flight causes significant flight safety risks from aircraft and ground obstacle collisions, and dynamic rollover due to sloped and uneven terrain. Brownouts have claimed more helicopters in recent military operations than all other threats combined (as of 2005).

There are several factors which affect the probability and severity of brownout:

- rotor disk loading
- rotor configuration
- soil composition
- wind
- approach speed and angle

Countermeasures to prevent brownout-related accidents include:

- Site preparation
- Pilot technique
- Synthetic vision systems also known as "see and remember"
- Upgraded horizontal situation indicator with improved symbology
- Aerodynamics such as the "winged rotor" on the AgustaWestland EH101
- Non-visual displays of position and orientation data derived from suitable sensors, such as Tactile Situational Awareness Systems (TSAS) providing information to the pilot through the sense of touch using tactors.

== Sensory illusions ==
Blowing sand and dust can cause an illusion of a tilted horizon. A pilot not using the flight instruments for reference may instinctively try to level the aircraft with respect to the false horizon, resulting in an accident. Helicopter rotor wash also causes sand to blow around outside the cockpit windows, possibly leading the pilot to experience the vection illusion, where the helicopter appears to be turning when it is actually in a level hover. This can also cause the pilot to make incorrect control inputs, which can quickly lead to disaster when hovering near the ground. In night landings, aircraft lighting can enhance the visual illusions by illuminating the brownout cloud.

The visible effects of sand rotor abrasion have been extensively observed in Afghanistan.

== U.S. military experience ==
Several coalition military aircraft were lost due to roll-overs while executing dust landings during the Gulf War period of 1990–91. In the decade between then and Operation Enduring Freedom, the U.S. Army recorded over 40 cases of brownout condition accidents during training at the Fort Irwin Military Reservation National Training Center in California, and other various sites. Since 1991, there have been over 230 cases of aircraft damage and/or injury due to unsuccessful take-offs or landings in a dust environment. Although the majority of the incidents occur during landings, there have been a significant number of incidents occurring during take-offs as well. For the more than 50 brown-out incidents with damage reported to date during Army military operations in the 2001–2007 time frame, 80 percent were during landings and 20 percent during takeoffs.

Helicopter brownout is a US$100 million per year problem for the U.S. Military in Afghanistan and Iraq. The Army cites brownout in three out of every four helicopter accidents there. Brownout accidents occur close to the ground and at low airspeed, giving these accidents a higher survivability than other types. However, there have been deaths in military accidents in Iraq and Afghanistan, and nearly all of those were preventable.

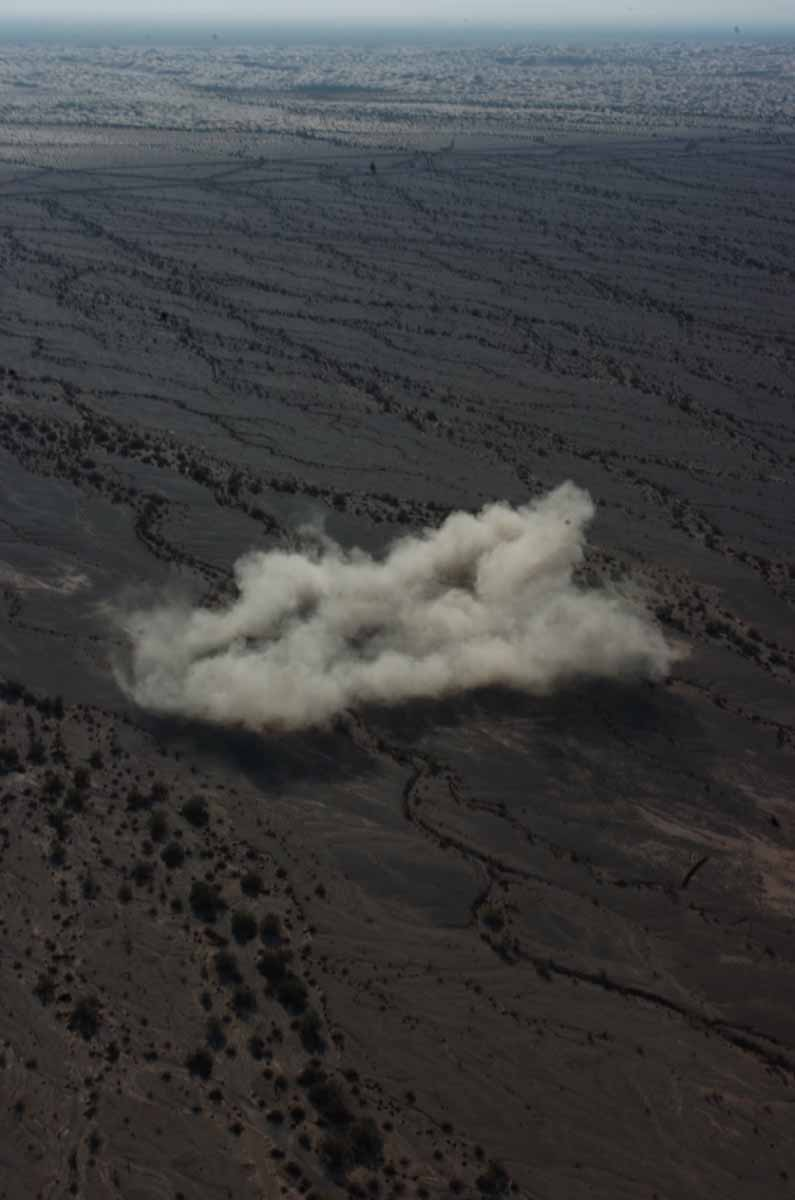
An MV-22 Osprey is not visible in the large brownout dust cloud that it created during training.

Brownout accidents destroyed or severely damaged four AH-64D Apache Longbows in the first three weeks of the 2003 Iraq invasion, while only one had been lost in combat in the same time period. The tandem seat Apache has a narrower stance than the UH-60 Black Hawk, making it more susceptible to rollover if the pilot begins to lose roll attitude control from the brownout. But at night, the Apache's infra-red vision system provides improved visibility when dust obscures the moonlight—the Blackhawk's night vision goggles only amplify available visible light.

The CH-47 Chinook has had a relatively high frequency of brownout accidents. As of 2007, nine Chinooks were lost in action in Afghanistan, and at least two were caused by brownout, which likely played a role in several other incidents. According to the Project on Government Oversight (POGO), 12 of 41 U.S. Army brownout accidents between 2002 and 2005 involved CH-47s. Data compiled by POGO from government sources show the Chinook flew 7 percent of all U.S. Army helicopter flight hours between 2003 and 2005 but accounted for 30 percent of all brownout-related accidents.

Brownout is a particular concern for the U.S. V-22 Osprey tiltrotor aircraft, which was deployed for combat in Iraq in September 2007. The high proprotor disk loading creates a high-velocity downwash, which stirs up the dust cloud from a much higher altitude. This can be a problem while hovering during personnel insertion and extraction via hoist or rope. Initial operational experience indicates that although the dust cloud is larger with the MV-22 than it is with the CH-46 it is replacing, pilots report regaining visibility near the ground, allowing them to use visual references prior to landing.

== Partial list of related accidents ==
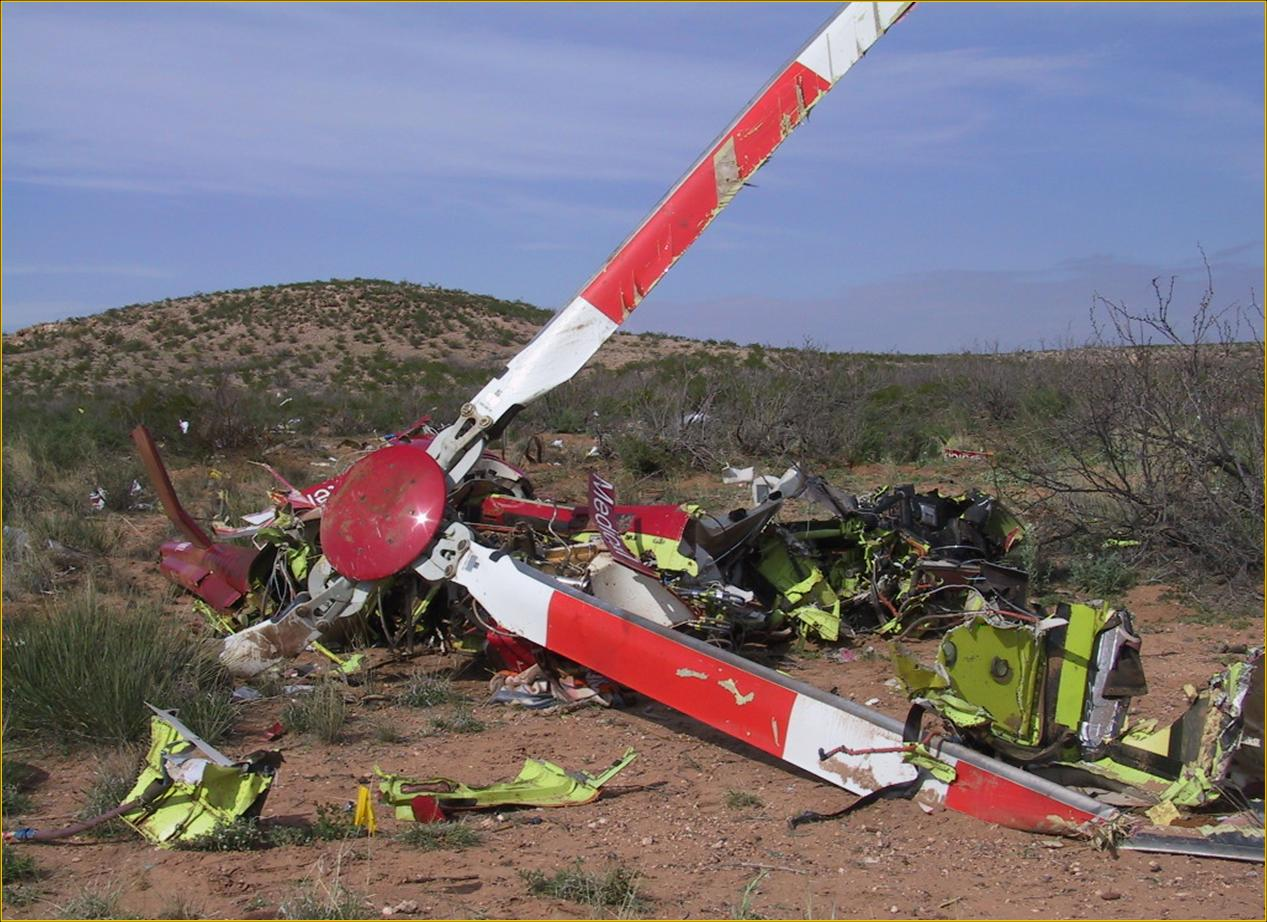
N502MT EMS helicopter wreckage, near Pyote, Texas

=== Civilian ===
- August 18, 2001, Vinton, California, USA: A Rocky Mountain Holdings, Aerospatiale AS355F1 (N53LH) MEDEVAC helicopter was damaged in dynamic rollover after an aborted takeoff at a remote location, with no injuries. The helicopter was substantially damaged. The pilot experienced brownout after lifting off approximately 3 feet (0.91 meters) off the ground.
- September 22, 2001, Chico, California, USA: An Enloe Medical Center Aerospatiale AS350BA (N911NT) helicopter was destroyed after colliding with trees in an aborted landing at a ballpark killing the pilot and injuring one of two flight nurses on board. Witnesses on the scene reported a brownout cloud obscured their vision of the accident sequence.
- March 21, 2004, Pyote, Texas, USA: A Med-Trans Bell 407 (N502MT) EMS helicopter crashed into terrain while maneuvering in reduced visibility at night while transporting a patient. The pilot, flight paramedic, patient, and patient's mother were killed, and the flight nurse was seriously injured. Witnesses reported brown-out conditions at the time of the accident.
- June 26, 2004, Cibecue, Arizona, USA: A Native American Air Ambulance AS350B3 (N5226R) MEDEVAC helicopter landed hard on a baseball field in a brownout, damaging the tail boom, but without injuring the crew. The damage was not discovered on a post-flight inspection, or subsequent pre-flight inspections, and was only noticed by an aircraft maintenance technician 8 days later.
- August 16, 2005, Donnelly, Idaho, USA: A Heliflite LLC, Hughes 369E (N500FU) helicopter was substantially damaged when the main rotor blade hit a tree on landing, with no injuries. Recent construction work at the site disturbed the surface, creating unexpected brownout conditions.

=== Military ===
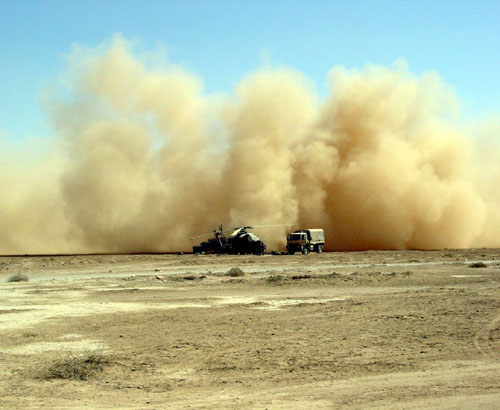
An AH-64A Apache from the 2nd Squadron, 6th Cavalry Regiment, leaves an enormous cloud of dust after landing at a desert airstrip in central Iraq.

- October 19, 2001, Dalbandin, Pakistan: As the U.S. Army Rangers, Task Force 3/75 MH-60K Black Hawk search and rescue helicopter approached to land at night, it had a brownout, obscuring the landing area. The aircraft crashed into a sand dune, killing two rangers on board as passengers, and injuring three others.
- December 6, 2001, Forward operating base (FOB), Afghanistan: A U.S. Marine Corps, HMM-365, UH-1N helicopter inadvertently touched down on takeoff while drifting to the right and rolled over. One crew member was ejected, and the other three exited before the aircraft was destroyed by fire. Another nearby helicopter was damaged by flying debris from the rotor.
- August 12, 2002, FOB, Operation Enduring Freedom: A U.S. Air Force, 347th Rescue Wing, HH-60G Pave Hawk helicopter departed slowly without sufficient power to climb out of the dust cloud generated on take-off from its own rotor wash. The pilot tried to land and hit a sand berm. The six aircraft occupants evacuated without serious injury.
- February 13, 2003, near Ali Al Salem Air Base, Kuwait: A U.S. Air Force, 20th Special Operations Squadron, MH-53M (s/n 10930) helicopter was badly damaged when crew misjudged a night landing in brownout conditions, resulting in some minor injuries. The aircraft was salvaged.
- March 23, 2003, U.S. Army Aviation Base Camp, Central Iraq: A U.S. Army 6th Cavalry Regiment, AH-64D Apache Longbow helicopter crashed on takeoff on the unit's first day at that base camp.
- March 28, 2003, Iraq: A U.S. Army 101st Aviation Regiment, AH-64D Apache helicopter, while departing from FOB Shell for a combat mission with approximately 40 other fully loaded helicopters, rolled over in severe brownout approximately 4 minutes after the first aircraft took off.
- March 28, 2003, Iraq: A U.S. Army 101st Aviation Regiment, AH-64D Apache (97-5032) helicopter, after returning to FOB Shell from a combat mission, landed hard in brownout conditions, rolled over, and was severely damaged (though later salvaged and repaired).
- March 31, 2003, Iraq: A U.S. Army 103rd Aviation Regiment, AH-64D Apache (99-5104) helicopter creates brownout on takeoff for a MEDEVAC escort mission, resulting in main rotor strike, rollover, and hull loss.
- April 5, 2003, Camp Thunder Road, Kuwait: A U.S. Army 101st Aviation Regiment, UH-60 Black Hawk helicopter collided with a sling load during a pickup attempt in brownout conditions. The three injured crew members pulled the two seriously injured pilots from the burning wreckage before it was destroyed by fire.
- April 26, 2004, location not specified: A U.S. Marine Corps, HMM-266, CH-46E helicopter made a hard landing during brownout. Its rotor blades struck terrain, but it remained upright.
- July 27, 2005, Spin Buldak Afghanistan: A Royal Netherlands Air Force, 298 Squadron CH-47D Chinook (D-105) helicopter made a hard landing due to brown-out conditions as the crew was attempting to insert forces on the border between Afghanistan and Pakistan. The aircraft was destroyed by fire but there were no injuries.

== See also ==
- Safety of emergency medical services flights
- Hazards of helicopter flight
