= Asian Dust =

East Asian meteorological phenomenon

Yellow Dust
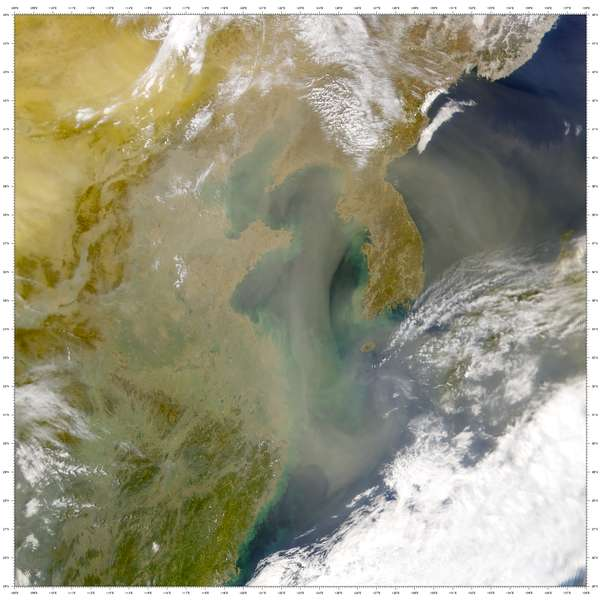
- Dust clouds leaving mainland China and traveling toward Korea and Japan

Chinese name
- Traditional Chinese: 黃沙
- Simplified Chinese: 黄沙
Transcriptions
Standard Mandarin
- Hanyu Pinyin: Huángshā
- Bopomofo: ㄏㄨㄤˊ ㄕㄚ
- Wade–Giles: huang2 sha1
- Tongyong Pinyin: huang2 sha1
Wu
- Romanization: waon^{平} so^{平} _{(Wuu Pinyin)} IPA: [ɦuaŋ so]
Hakka
- Romanization: vong^{11} sa^{24}
Yue: Cantonese
- Jyutping: wong4 sa1
Southern Min
- Hokkien POJ: hong2 sê1

Vietnamese name
- Vietnamese: bão cát vàng

Korean name
- Hangul: 황사
- Hanja: 黃沙; 黃砂
Transcriptions
- Revised Romanization: hwangsa
- McCune–Reischauer: hwangsa

Japanese name
- Kanji: 黄砂
- Kana: こうさ
Transcriptions
- Revised Hepburn: kōsa
- Kunrei-shiki: kôsa
- Nihon-shiki: kôsa

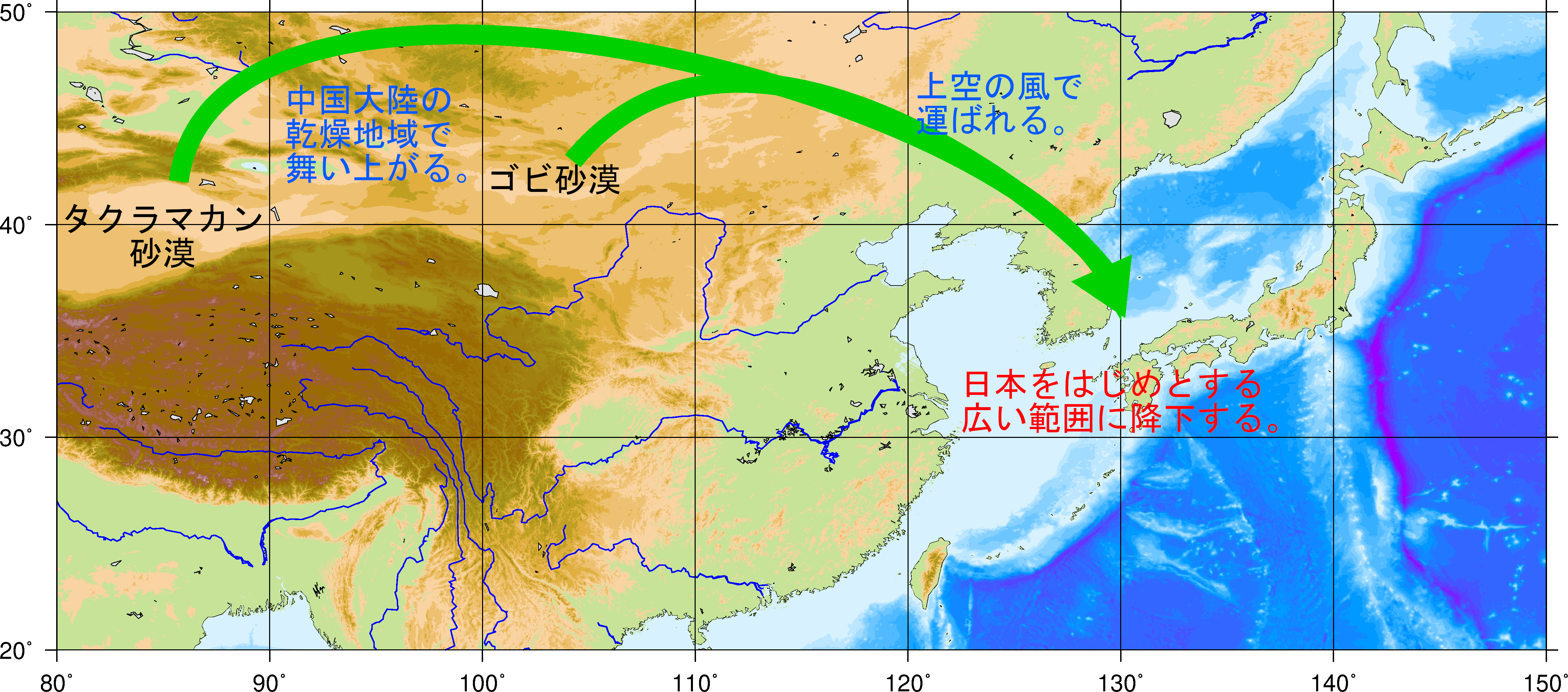
Asian dust soars in the arid regions of mainland China and rides on the wind to descend to regions such as Japan.

Asian Dust (also yellow dust, yellow sand, yellow wind, or kosa) is a meteorological phenomenon that affects much of East Asia year-round and especially during the spring months. The dust originates in the deserts of China, Mongolia, and Kazakhstan, where high-speed surface winds and intense dust storms kick up dense clouds of fine, dry soil particles. These clouds are then carried eastward by prevailing winds and pass over China, North and South Korea, and Japan, as well as parts of the Russian Far East. Sometimes, the airborne particulates are carried much further, in significant concentrations which affect air quality as far east as the United States.

Since the turn of the 21st century, coinciding with the rapid industrialization of China, yellow dust has become a serious health problem due to the increase of industrial pollutants contained in the dust. Intensified desertification due to deforestation has been causing longer and more frequent occurrences. The issue has been exacerbated as the Aral Sea of Kazakhstan and Uzbekistan has largely dried up. This started in the 1960s with the diversion of the Amu River and Syr River, as part of a Soviet agricultural program to irrigate Central Asian deserts, mainly for cotton plantations.

== Ancient reports ==
Some of the earliest written records of dust storm activity are recorded in ancient Chinese literature. It is believed that the earliest Chinese dust storm record was found in the Zhu Shu Ji Nian (Chinese: 竹书纪年; English: the Bamboo Annals). The record said: in the fifth year of Di Xin (1150 BC, Di Xin was the Era Name of the King Di Xin of Shang dynasty), it rained dust at Bo (Bo is a place in Henan Province in China; in Classical Chinese: 帝辛五年，雨土于亳).

The first known record of an Asian Dust event in Korea was in 174 AD during the Silla dynasty. The dust was known as "Uto (우토, 雨土)", meaning 'Raining Dirt/Earth', and was believed at the time to be the result of an angry god sending down dust instead of rain or snow. Specific records referring to Asian Dust events in Korea also exist from the Baekje, Goguryeo, and Joseon periods.

== Composition ==
An analysis of Asian Dust clouds conducted in China in 2001 found that they contain high concentrations of silicon (24–32%), aluminium (5.9–7.4%), calcium (6.2–12%), and iron. Numerous toxic substances were also found, including mercury and cadmium from coal burning.

People further from the source of the dust are more often exposed to nearly invisible, fine dust particles that they can unknowingly inhale deep into their lungs, as coarse dust is too big to be deeply inhaled. After inhalation, these particles can cause long-term pulmonary fibrosis (lung tissue scarring), and induce cancer and other types of lung diseases.

Sulfur (an acid rain component), soot, ash, carbon monoxide, and other toxic pollutants including heavy metals (such as mercury, cadmium, chromium, arsenic, lead, zinc, copper) and other carcinogens, often accompany the dust storms, along with viruses, bacteria, fungi, pesticides, antibiotics, asbestos, herbicides, plastic ingredients, combustion products and hormone-mimicking phthalates. Though scientists had known that intercontinental dust plumes can ferry bacteria and viruses, "most people had assumed that the [sun's] ultraviolet light would sterilize these clouds," says microbiologist Dale W. Griffin, "We now find that isn't true."

Research done in 2014 found that Asian dust consists of fine dust and ultrafine dust particles. Fine dust consists of fine particulate matter (PM). Particles smaller than 10 μm in diameter are classified as fine PM (PM_{10}), while particles smaller than 2.5 μm in diameter are classified as ultrafine PM (PM_{2.5}). Both fine and ultrafine dust particles impose dangers to health. Fine dust particles are small enough to penetrate deep into the lung alveoli. Ultrafine dust particles are so small that they also penetrate into the blood or lymphatic system through the lungs. Once in the bloodstream, ultrafine particles can even reach the brain or fetal organs.

== Cause ==
The main cause of Asian dust is desertification of northern China, Mongolia, and Central Asia. Desertification in these regions owe to extensive logging in the forests and extensive harvesting of arable land. The origins of Asian dust are mostly located in developing countries; thus, most of these countries are undergoing rapid population growth. A study pointed to China's deforestation and soil erosion as indirect effects of the nation's booming population. High population growth in China has led to increasing demand for wood for housing and furniture as well as for firewood for cooking and heating. This increase in demand for wood (and firewood) has led to over-cutting of timber. At the same time, there has been an increase in demand for food, which has led to soil erosion due to overgrazing of arable land. For example, the northern part of Shaanxi Province and the Haixi area of Gansu Province was once a deep forest region, but the region now only has treeless mountains. Historically "because peasant farmers continue[d] to rely on low-technology agricultural techniques, they [had] to exploit virgin land to sustain a continually growing population. This led to a vicious cycle. Since traditional agricultural techniques rely heavily on human labor, people continued to have more children, which in turn led to more overgrazing.

== Effects ==
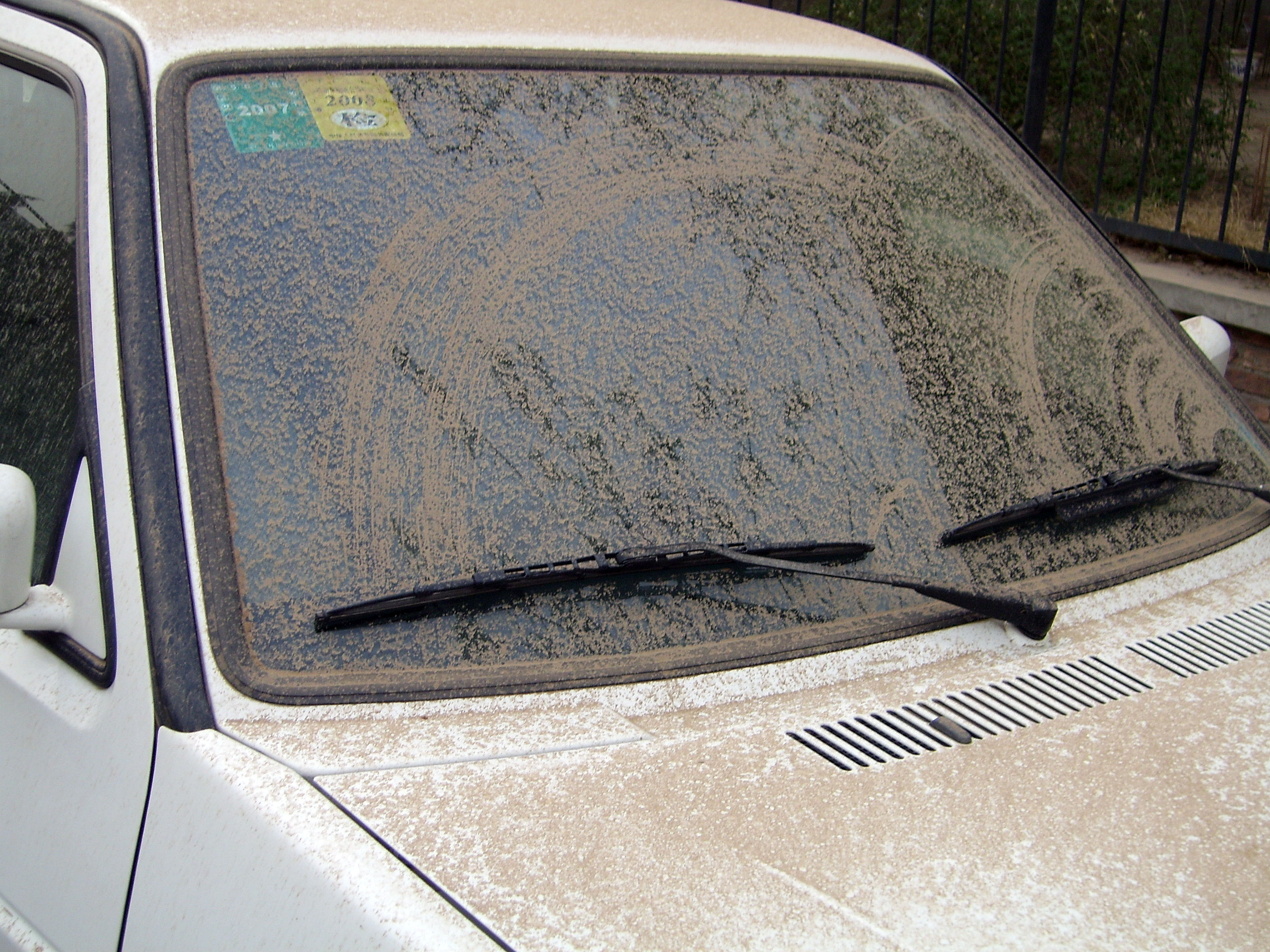
Dust deposition in Beijing during the 2006 season

=== Dangers to health ===
Perhaps the most important negative effect is on health. Many studies have found Asian dust to have negative effect on respiratory function and increase the occurrence of respiratory disease. Several research studies conducted in Korea and Japan focused on respiratory function performance by measuring peak expiratory flow. These studies found that individuals with respiratory diseases such as asthma suffer from the most adverse effects. There is also evidence that days with Asian Dust coupled with smog lead to increased mortality due to respiratory and cardiovascular diseases among inhabitants in affected regions. A recent study has also found PM_{2.5} to have an association with Parkinson's disease and other neurological diseases. The OECD predicted 1,069 premature deaths per million directly attributable to worsening air pollution in South Korea by 2060.

Areas affected by the dust experience decreased visibility and the dust is known to cause a variety of health problems, including sore throat and asthma in otherwise healthy people. Often, people are advised to avoid or minimize outdoor activities, depending on severity of storms. For those already with asthma or respiratory infections, it can be fatal. The dust has been shown to increase the daily mortality rate in one affected region by 1.7%.

=== Restrictions on outdoor activities ===
Due to the concerning health effects, residents of affected regions have reduced their exposure to Asian dust by refraining from outdoor activities. Despite the temperature rise to warm levels during spring season, popular outdoor destinations are empty on days with yellow dust advisory or warning. According to a survey in 2019, 97% of Koreans reported that they suffered from physical or mental distress due to Asian dust including fine dust during the time of the survey.

Since children are among the most vulnerable to fine dust particles, affected countries have come up with measures to minimize the detrimental effects on children; in 2017, South Korea's Ministry of Education have required all primary to high schools to create indoor spaces for sports and outdoor activities. Similar efforts are arising in professional sports. In 2019, the Korea Baseball Organization changed its regulations to cancel or suspend professional games during a severe fine dust warning.

=== Effects on industries ===
In addition to costs incurred by individuals, the rise of Asian dust has led to mixed pecuniary effects in different industries. First, the airline industry have been experiencing external costs due to the increasing severity of Asian dust. Dust collected on the plane surface can decrease the lift of the wings and react with moisture to corrode the aircraft's surface and decolorize the paint. As a result, during spring, when Asian dust levels are at the highest, airlines with aircraft in the affected region spend time and money to wash dust off their aircraft. Washing dust off a single B747 jumbo jet typically takes 6000 liters of water and eight hours with nine people working. Although cancellations stemming from yellow dust are rare, flights are cancelled due to poor visibility on the most severe days.

On the other hand, Asian dust also has led to some positive effects in certain industries. The demand for products to combat Asian dust has increased significantly. During a period of high fine dust levels in 2019, face mask and air purifier sales surged 458% and 414%, respectively, compared to the same period in 2018. The sale of dryers also surged 67% during the same period as outdoor air drying no longer became an option.

=== Socio-economic cost ===
Calculating the socioeconomic cost of yellow dust is a difficult endeavor. It requires estimating the negative effects on health, opportunity cost of outdoor activities, the cost of preventive measures, as well as the psychological distress. However, a research study estimated the total socio-economic cost of yellow dust using techniques including input-output analysis, integration of environmental-economic evaluation technique, contingent valuation method, etc. According to this study, the total socio-economic cost of yellow dust damage in South Korea in 2002 estimates between US$3.9 billion and $7.3 billion. This accounts for between 0.6% and 1.0% of the nation's GDP and US$81.48 and $152.52 per nation's resident.

Another study that focused on the total economic impacts of the yellow dust storms in Beijing concluded that it accounted for greater than 2.9% of the city's GDP in the year 2000.

=== Nutrient distribution ===
Asian dust is a historically significant contributor of soil nutrients for some North Pacific islands, including Hawaii.

== Public economics ==
=== Negative externality ===
Asian dust is an example of a negative externality on society. Policy choices that favor rapid industrialization and deforestation in China, Mongolia, and other Central Asian regions impose social costs on Eastern countries, such as Korea, Japan, and Russia in the Far East.

The main cause of deforestation is extensive logging. Although the production of firewood and other wooden products induce deforestation, which leads to yellow dust as well as other ecological dangers, the social cost of yellow dust is not accounted for in the cost of production. This results in a market failure in which individual producers make decisions based on their private marginal cost - not accounting for the dust - rather than the social marginal cost, which includes the harms from the dust. Under a free market, the quantity of logs and other wooden goods produced exceeds the socially optimal outcome.

=== International debate ===
The responsibility for transboundary dust has been a source of international debate between the Chinese and Korean governments. Although the major components of yellow dust are sand and materials from the Earth's crust, various industrial pollutants and their by-products, including mercury, sulfuric acid, nitric acid and cadmium, have made the dust more harmful. Approximately 30% of sulfuric acid and 40% of nitric acid in ambient air in Korea may have migrated from China. To reduce the transboundary pollution from China, scientists have advocated for collaborative actions between Korea and China, including scientific, administrative, and political aspects.

In an effort to combat the worsening yellow dust levels, the Korean government has been working with the Chinese government. In January 2018, the two countries met at its 22nd meeting of the Republic of Korea-China Joint Committee on Environmental Cooperation, during which the two countries discussed increasing the cooperative efforts to fight air pollution, including yellow dust and fine dust, and marine pollution.

== Severity ==
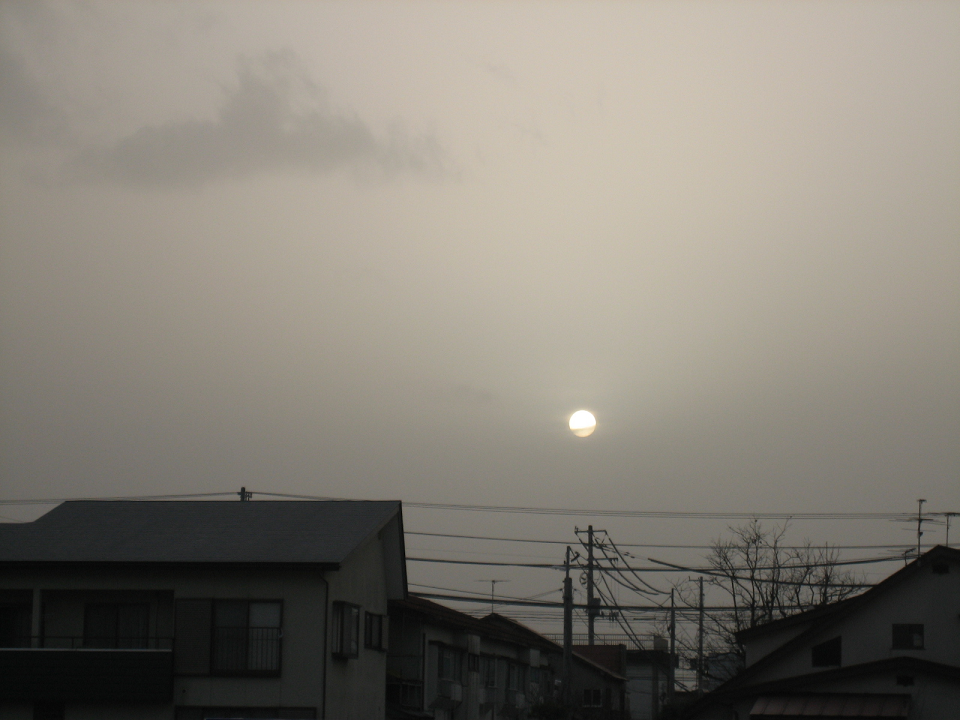
Asian Dust obscures the sun over Aizu-Wakamatsu, Japan, on April 2, 2007.

Asian dust is not a new phenomenon. Historically, there have been records of Asian dust occurrences as early as 1150 B.C. in China and 174 A.D. in Korea. However, official weather data show a stark increase in its severity and frequency.

In the last half century, the number of days with reports of Asian dust has increased five-fold. According to an analysis on data from Korea Meteorological Administration (KMA), the average number of days with Asian dust in a given year was about two in the 1960s. However, this number has increased to 11 in 2000s. In 1960s and 1970s, each decade had 3 years that were Asian-dust free. However, starting from 2000s, there has not been a single year without Asian dust. In just four months of 2018, Gyeonggi Province of South Korea issued 42 dust warnings and advisories, which has increased from 36 in the same period in 2017. This reflects the increase in average dust concentration level from 132.88 ppm (parts per million) in 2017 to 149 ppm in 2018. The situation is worsening since the dust particles are staying in the air longer. The average duration has increased from 16.3 hours to 19.8 hours in the last two years.

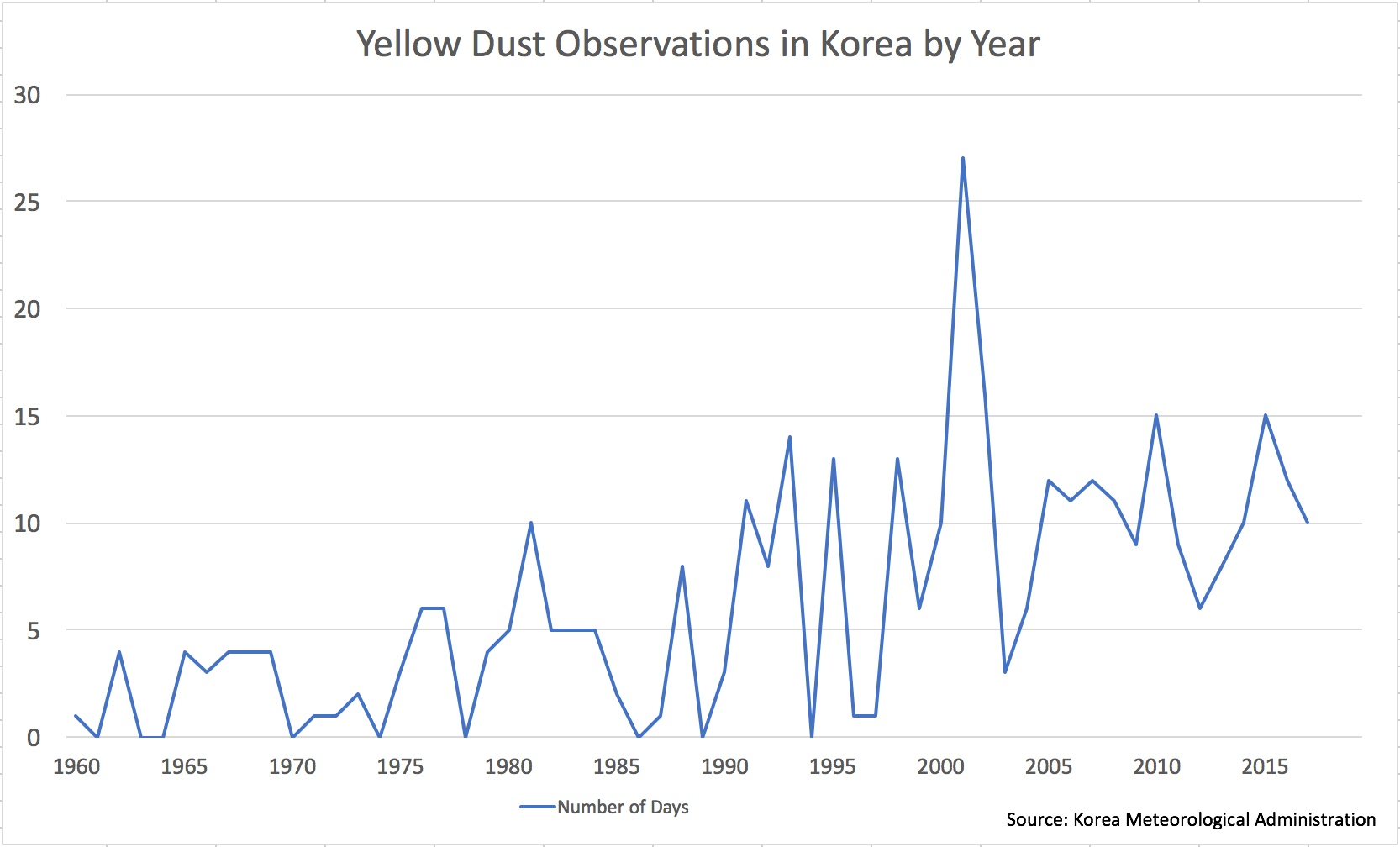
Number of days of Yellow Dust Observations in Korea from 1960 to 2016

Asian dust, in combination with smog and general air pollution, has become so severe that it became a political issue in the South Korean presidential election in 2017. All three main candidates of the election—Moon Jae-in, Ahn Cheol-soo, and Hong Joon-pyo—promised to take measures to alleviate these growing national air pollution problems. In the first few months of 2017, Seoul had twice the number of ultrafine dust warnings, during which people were advised to limit outdoor activities and stay indoors when compared to 2016.

Shanghai on April 3, 2007, recorded an air quality index of 500. In the US, an index of 300 is considered "hazardous" and anything over 200 is "unhealthy". Desertification has intensified in China, as 1,740,000 km^{2} of land is "dry", which disrupts the lives of 400 million people and causes direct economic losses of 54 billion yuan (US$7 billion) per year, SFA figures show. These figures are probably vastly underestimated, as they only take into account direct effects, without including medical, pollution, and other secondary effects, as well as effects to neighboring nations.

El Niño also plays a role in Asian dust storms, because winter ice can keep dust from sweeping off the land.

== See also ==
- 2010 China drought and dust storms
- Asian brown cloud
- Deforestation and climate change
- Environment of China
- Environment of South Korea
- Fugitive dust
- Bulldust
- Fech fech
- Dry quicksand
- Illegal logging
- Mineral dust
- Saharan dust
- Shamal (wind)
- Southeast Asian haze
