= Fech fech =

Very fine powder commonly found in deserts

Fech fech (Arabic: فش فش) is a very fine powder caused by the erosion of clay-limestone terrain and it is most commonly found in deserts. It consists of a surface horizon of pulverized soil with low particle cohesion protected under a thin crust. Fech fech is derived from ancient lake muds or on certain argillaceous rocks and is one of the desert surfaces that produces dust. It is not determinable from the surface and can therefore pose a significant transportation hazard acting as a surprise "trap" as the ground collapses beneath a vehicle, miring it in a quicksand-like substance.

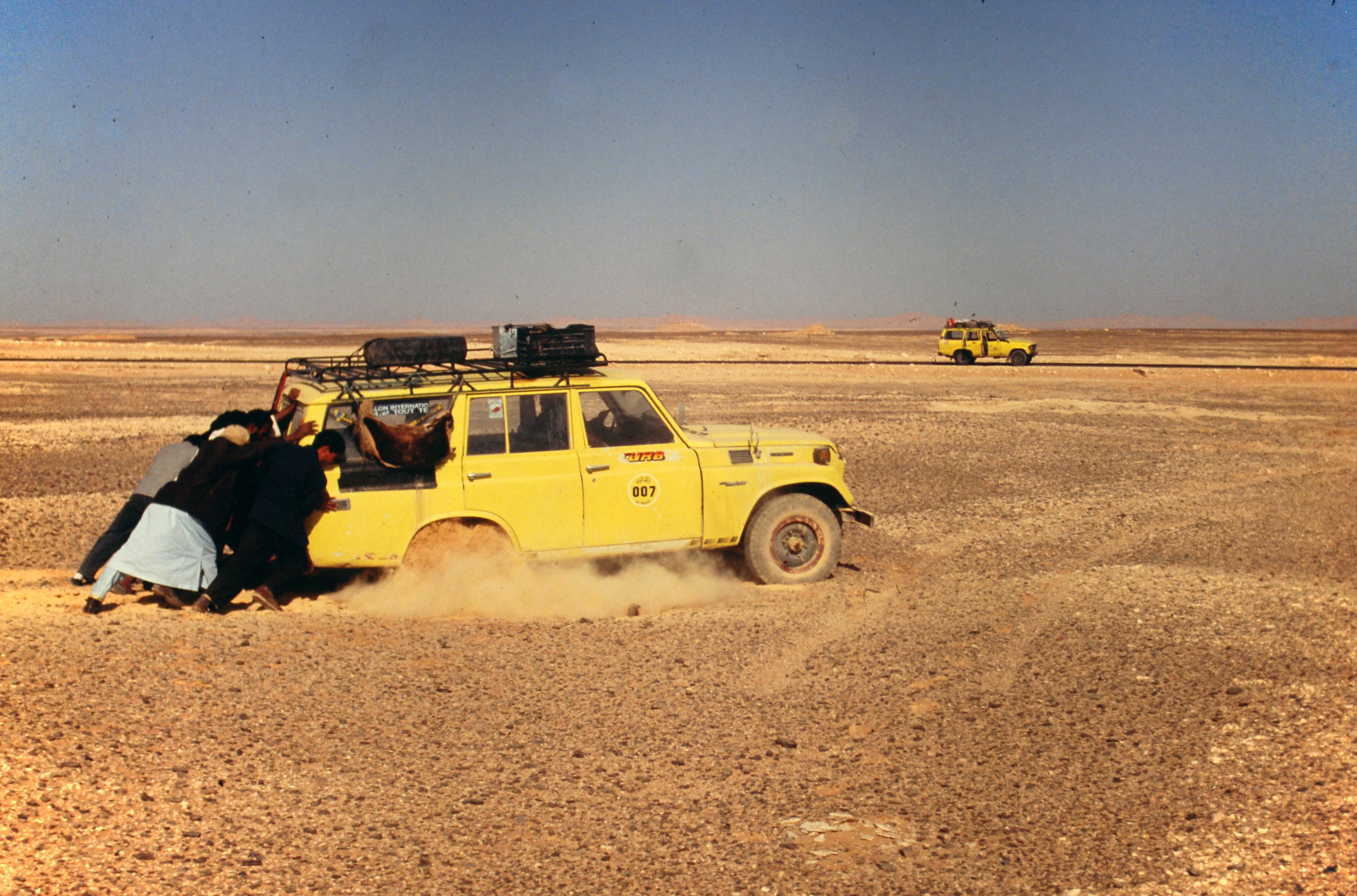
A taxi is pushed out of the treacherous fech fech

Fech-fech is classified into two types:

- Fech-fech that developed during the Holocene, in lake mud or fluvio-lacustrine sediments.
- Fech-fech that developed from shale.

Fech fech is common in the Qattara Depression in Egypt, making that portion of the Sahara Desert impassable by most vehicles.

== See also ==
- Dry quicksand
- Bulldust
- Asian Dust
