= Bulldust =

Aeolian mineral powder

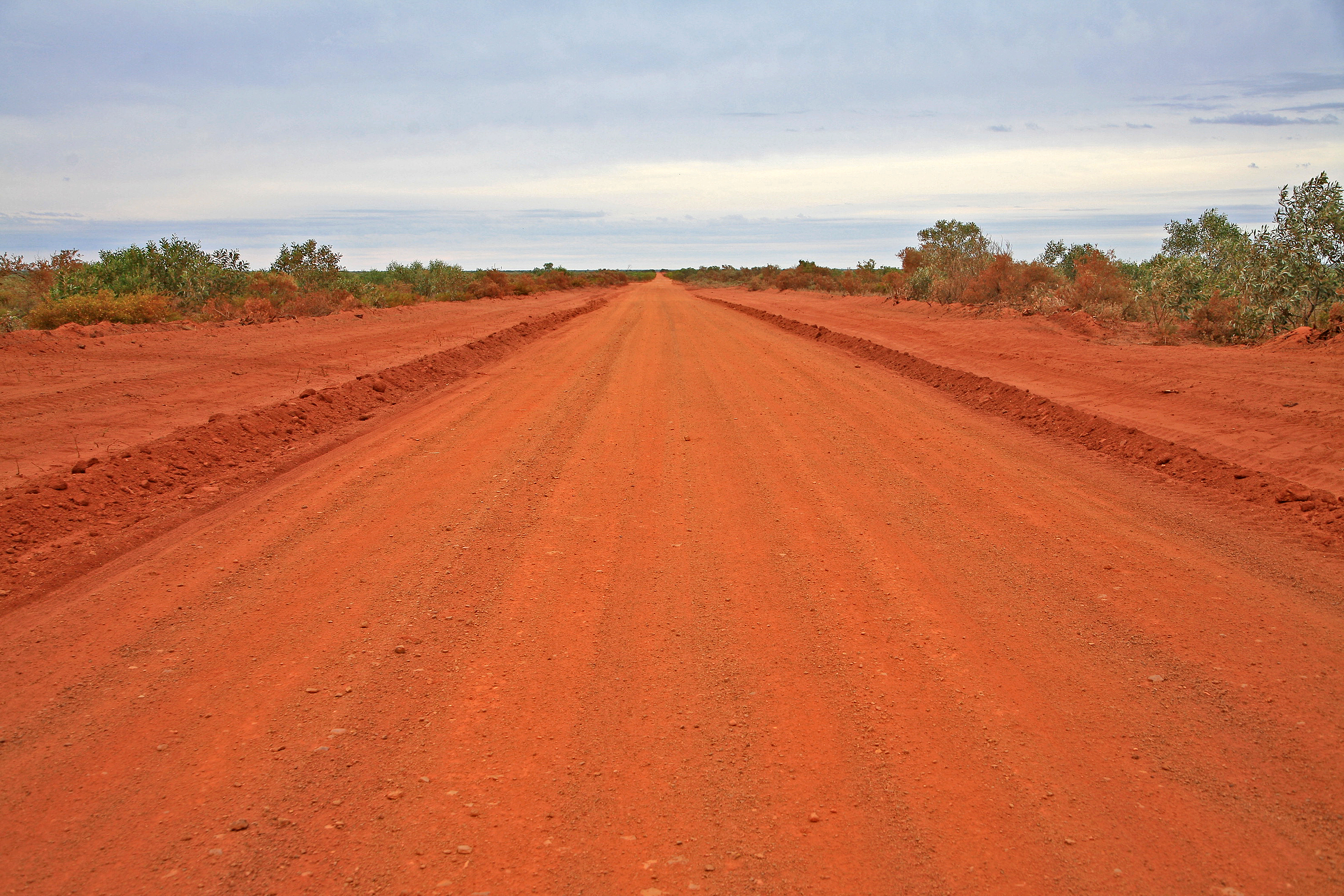
Bulldust on a road in the Australian Outback

Bulldust or bull dust is a fine, soft and powdery red aeolian dust that is common across Australia, especially in the Outback and desert. It is a type of fugitive dust that, when disturbed, can have dangerous effects. It is common on remote roads, especially in the far north of Australia where the wet and dry season can cause the roads to either be boggy or very dry. The term originated in the 1920s.

== Causes and general description ==
Most soils in Australia have no cohesive structure and their surface often contains medium to high amounts of fine sand. Because of the lack of cohesion when compressed or disturbed, bulldust will form. These disturbances can be anything that breaks up the track surface, such as a car or vehicle driving along a road, or a pack of animals such as camels running through the desert. Once the road surface has been disturbed, the bulldust particles released into the air can remain suspended for up to several minutes. The dust will then resettle on the road surface, vegetation, and passing cars or vehicles. This can occur in dry areas such as the Outback, arid Australia, or when there has been an extended dry season in a normally damper area.

Bulldust can be identified when driving, by the softness of the road; it is visually similar to that of soft sand. From a distance, bulldust may appear to be settled, but once disturbed it billows up to form a dust cloud. The road has noticeable soft bumps and slumps caused by tyre tracks; the road surface resembles soft waves, which are caused by wheel ruts which have left depressions in the sand-like surface. Bulldust can range in intensity, from shallow slumps which range between a few centimetres deep with soft dusty edges, to more dangerous slumps ranging over 30 centimetres with a rock-hard edge.

== Effects ==
Bulldust can be problematic for people who drive through it, especially people with respiratory illnesses, sometimes causing coughing and sneezing, as well as damage to a car and impairing the ability to drive. In extreme cases, temporary loss of vision can cause car accidents such as rollovers, or can cause someone to hit vegetation or an animal such as a kangaroo, which can significantly damage a car and kill the animal. A concealed pothole can also significantly damage a car if the necessary precautions are not taken. Bulldust can cause a variety of other issues for those who are conducting engineering explorations and for farmers, as the dust can ruin crops, damage equipment, and, due to its unstable nature on roads, cause issues for transportation.

=== Driving ===
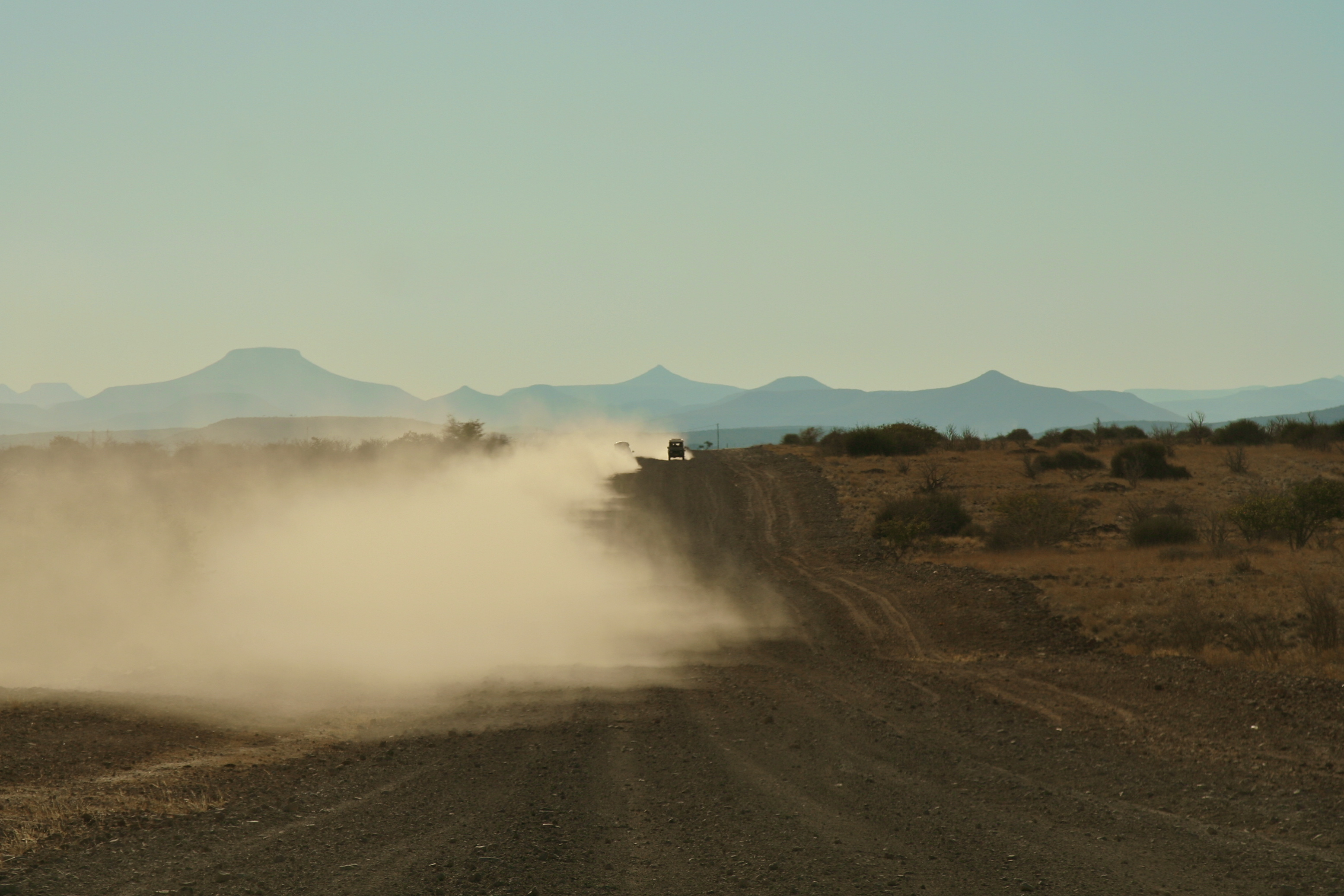
Bulldust billowing up behind a vehicle driving along a dirt track

When driving, bulldust billows up into a cloud behind a car and can have a range of effects on a car and a person's ability to drive, depending on the intensity of the dust. As bulldust is a fine and powdery substance, it can cause difficulties in keeping control of the vehicle and can cause skidding, which can lead to accidents. The fine dust can also damage a car's engine, especially through the engine's air intake system. A cloud of bulldust can impair a driver's vision and conceal road hazards such as potholes, animals, trees and other vehicles. The effects of driving through bulldust can include a burst tyre, getting bogged, a bent rim or suspension damage. In wet conditions, bulldust becomes compact and causes the surface to be slippery and slimy, which can be dangerous.

== Prevention ==
Controlling bulldust is not possible, but its effect on drivers and their ability to drive can be mitigated. The following are prevention measures that can be undertaken to protect a car and a person's health and safety:

- Traveling at a speed such that the car can handle the terrain. Speeds under 30 km/h (19 mph) can cause damage if corrugations are present.
- Slowing down to a speed where the car can stop quickly if there is reduced visibility on the road.
- Turning headlights on low beam so that the vehicle can be seen more easily by others, and high beam when there is reduced visibility (without using lightbar).
- Monitoring the vehicle's engine air filter, and removing excessive dust by removing the filter and tapping or shaking the dust out.
- Keeping a spare air filter for the engine in the vehicle.
- Regular servicing of the vehicle to ensure it is capable of travel.
- Deflating tyres to 16-18 pounds per square inch with a tyre deflator. This can improve the tyre's flexibility and reduce the effects of driving on it until the bulldust has been passed.
- Keeping windows closed and air conditioning on recirculation to ensure no dust enters the vehicle.
- Keeping a wide distance between vehicles to mitigate the effects of decreased visibility.
- Being wary of possible debris in the bulldust that cannot be seen, such as broken car pieces or shredded rubber.
- Driving around bulldust holes if possible. Often, the road will have widened from previous vehicles driving around the bulldust. It is recommended that this be done only if the road surface looks firm, and a new track is not being created on top of vegetation or fragile areas.
- Using high-range four-wheel drive if the road is particularly boggy or the bulldust holes are deep.
- Using radios when travelling as a group. Radios can make navigating areas with bulldust easier as trucks, tourist busses and other 4WD's will likely be equipped with them, allowing others to warn them of possible dangers they might have blocked sight of in their dust.

=== Mining ===
Bulldust also poses a problem for the mining industry, who have developed their own solutions to control the dust. Regulation of bulldust involves regular watering-down of the surface, and application of a chemical onto the road surface that hardens the road and suppresses the dust. Chemicals used include Zero, RT8, Shield AWR, Magnet and DustWorx. The chemical Zero is a synthetic organic that binds dust to the road without need of watering for approximately a year. RT8 is a natural biodegradable oil that coats the particles and binds them into place. Shield AWR is another natural liquid made of nanopolymers that works similarly to the other chemicals by binding the dust particle onto the road surface; however it can only work effectively on maintained roads, so cannot be applied to typical unmaintained rural roads where bulldust is omnipresent. Magnet is a chloride chemical that uses the moisture in the atmosphere to prevent dust from moving on the road; however this is typically less effective. DustWorx is a concentrated polymer that works to prevent dust particles from forming at the surface. These chemicals are all environmentally safe.

== See also ==
- 2009 Australian dust storm
- Asian dust
- Dry quicksand
- Fech fech
