= Dry quicksand =

Conjectural soil type probably not found in nature

Dry quicksand is loose sand whose bulk density is reduced by blowing air through it and which yields easily to weight or pressure. It acts similarly to normal quicksand, but it does not contain any water and does not operate on the same principle. Dry quicksand can also be a resulting phenomenon of contractive dilatancy.

Historically, the existence of dry quicksand was doubted, and the reports of humans and complete caravans being lost in dry quicksand were considered to be folklore. In 2004, it was created in the laboratory, but it is still not clear what its actual prevalence in nature is.

== Scientific research ==
Writing in Nature, physicist Detlef Lohse and coworkers of University of Twente in Enschede, Netherlands, allowed air to flow through very fine sand (typical grain diameter was about 40 micrometers) in a container with a perforated base. They then turned the air stream off before the start of the experiment and allowed the sand to settle: the packing fraction of this sand was only 41% (compared to 55–60% for untreated sand).

Lohse found that a weighted table tennis ball (radius 2 cm, mass 133 g), when released from just above the surface of the sand, would sink to about five diameters. Lohse also observed a "straight jet of sand [shooting] violently into the air after about 100 ms". Objects are known to make a splash when they hit sand, but this type of jet had never been described before.

Lohse concluded that:

In nature, dry quicksands may evolve from the sedimentation of very fine sand after it has been blown into the air and, if large enough, might be a threat to humans. Indeed, reports that travellers and whole vehicles have been swallowed instantly may even turn out to be credible in the light of our results.

During the planning of the Project Apollo Moon missions, dry quicksand on the Moon was considered as a potential danger to the missions. The successful landings of the unmanned Surveyor probes a few years earlier and their observations of a solid, rocky surface largely discounted this possibility, however. The large plates at the end of legs of the Apollo Lunar Module were designed to reduce this danger, but the astronauts did not encounter dry quicksand.

== See also ==
- Fech fech
- Fluidization
- Dilatancy (granular material)
- Kekexili: Mountain Patrol (film that features dry quicksand)
- Asian dust
- Bulldust
