= Quick condition =

State of saturated soils

The quick condition of soil is the condition when the upward water pressure gradient and water flow reduce the effective stress, i.e., cohesiveness of the soil. Sandy soils may lose their shear strength, and the soil may behave as a fluid‌. Cohesive soils may produce cracks with water seepage.

== See also ==
- Quicksand
